= Bamboo palm =

Bamboo palm is a plant name applied to certain genera and species of palm trees. They are unrelated to true bamboos.

- Chamaedorea, specifically Chamaedorea seifrizii
- Dypsis, specifically Dypsis lutescens, native to Madagascar
- Raphia, specifically Raphia vinifera, native to Nigeria
- Rhapis excelsa, probably native to southern China and Taiwan
