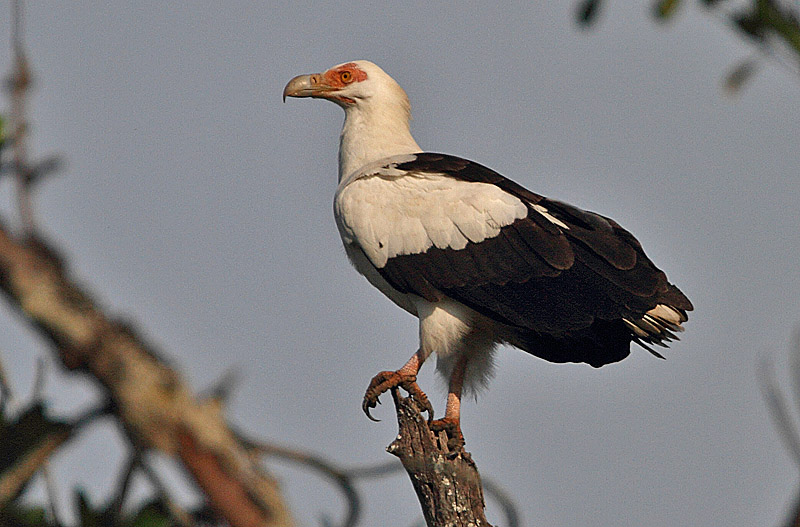

Conservation status
- Least Concern (IUCN 3.1)

Scientific classification
- Kingdom: Animalia
- Phylum: Chordata
- Class: Aves
- Order: Accipitriformes
- Family: Accipitridae
- Subfamily: Gypaetinae
- Genus: Gypohierax; Rüppell, 1836
- Species: G. angolensis

Binomial name
- Gypohierax angolensis (Gmelin, 1788)

= Palm-nut vulture =

Species of bird

The palm-nut vulture (Gypohierax angolensis) or vulturine fish eagle, is a large bird of prey in the family Accipitridae (which also includes many other diurnal raptors such as kites, buzzards and harriers, vultures, and eagles). It is the only member of the genus Gypohierax.

This bird is an Old World vulture (only distantly related to the New World vultures, which are in a separate family, the Cathartidae).

It breeds in forest and savannah across sub-Saharan Africa, usually near water, its range coinciding with that of the oil and Raffia palms. It is quite approachable, like many African vultures, and can be seen near habitation, even on large hotel lawns in the tourist areas of countries such as the Gambia.

== Taxonomy ==
The palm-nut vulture was formally described in 1788 by the German naturalist Johann Friedrich Gmelin in his revised and expanded edition of Carl Linnaeus's Systema Naturae. He placed it with the eagles, hawks and falcons in the genus Falco and coined the binomial name Falco angolensis. Gmelin based his description on the "Angola vulture" that had been described in 1781 by the English ornithologist John Latham in his multi-volume work A General Synopsis of Birds. The Leverian Collection in London included two specimens that had been collected in Angola. The palm-nut vulture is now placed in the genus Gypohierax that was introduced for the species in 1836 by the German naturalist Eduard Rüppell. The genus name combines the Ancient Greek gups meaning "vulture" with hierax meaning "hawk". The species is monotypic: no subspecies are recognised.

== Distribution and habitat ==
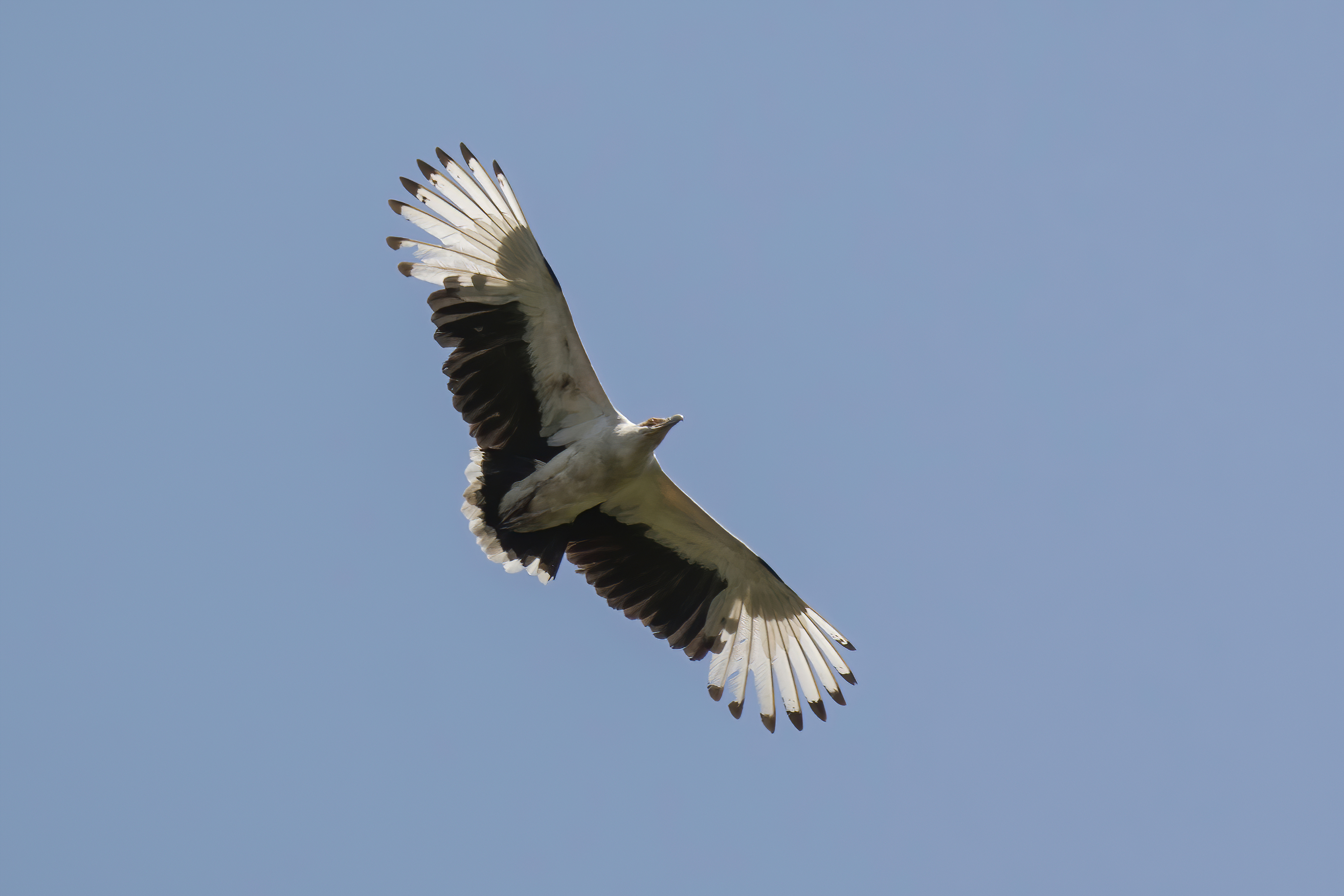
In flight in Semliki Wildlife Reserve, Uganda

Palm-nut vultures are found throughout most of the coastal areas of the African continent from The Gambia to Kenya and as far South as South Africa. The total African population is estimated to be 80,000 pairs. There are approximately 40 birds in South Africa.

The only Southern African subregions to have resident breeding pairs of palm-nut vultures are South Africa and Mozambique. The breeding distribution of the palm-nut vulture during the 1970s census period was centred on the Raffia palm groves of the Kosi Bay system and Mtunzini. Its distribution is linked to the presence of the Raffia palm Raphia australis at all permanently occupied sites, and the existence of this species at Mtunzini is entirely due to the artificial cultivation of Raffia palms. Currently there are 7 known nesting sites in South Africa and a total of 40 individual birds.

As the name suggests, the distribution of the palm-nut vulture closely tracks that of oil (Elaeis guineensis) or raffia (Raphia sp.) palms. Consequently, it is most common in coastal forests and mangrove swamps below 1,500 m (4,900 ft), but also occurs in wet savannas.

== Description ==
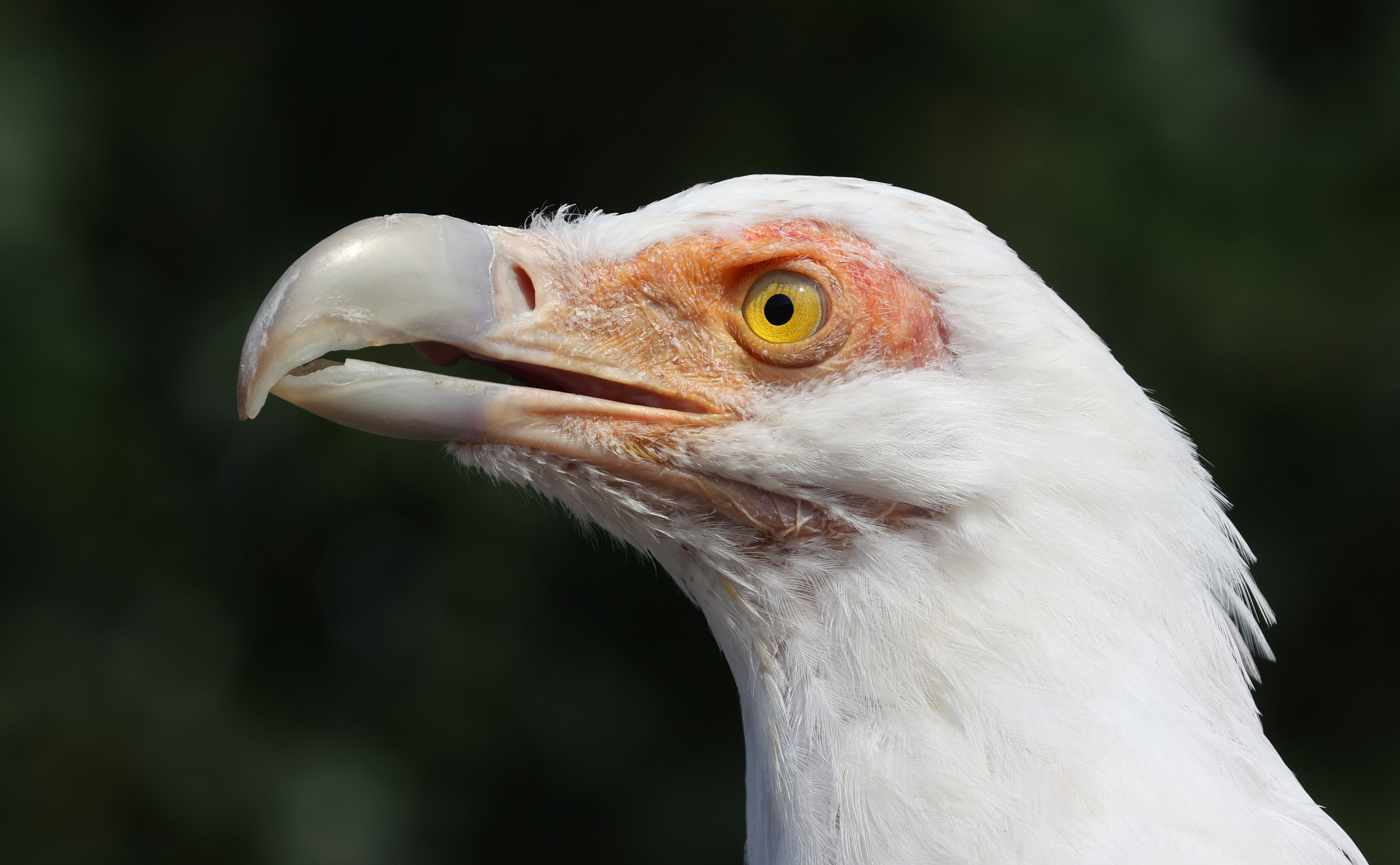
Head closeup

This is a nearly unmistakable bird as an adult. At 1.3–1.7 kg (2.9–3.7 lb) in weight, 60 cm (2.0 ft) in length and with a wingspan of 1.50 m (4.9 ft), this is the smallest Old World vulture. Its plumage is all white except for black areas in its wings and tail. It has a red patch around each eye. The juvenile, which takes 3–4 years to mature, is brown with yellow eye-patches. In flight, this species resembles an eagle more than a typical vulture, and it can sustain flapping flight, so it does not depend on thermals. With its extensive white plumage, and black wing- and tail-feathers, the adult palm-nut vulture can be crudely mistaken for both the African fish-eagle and the Egyptian vulture, but clearly lacks the chestnut body of the former and the white tail of the latter.

The sexes are identical in appearance, with the female being the same size as the male. Juveniles on the other hand are predominately brown with partially black wings and take a lengthy three to four years to make the transition into the adult plumage.

== Behaviour and ecology ==
=== Food and feeding ===
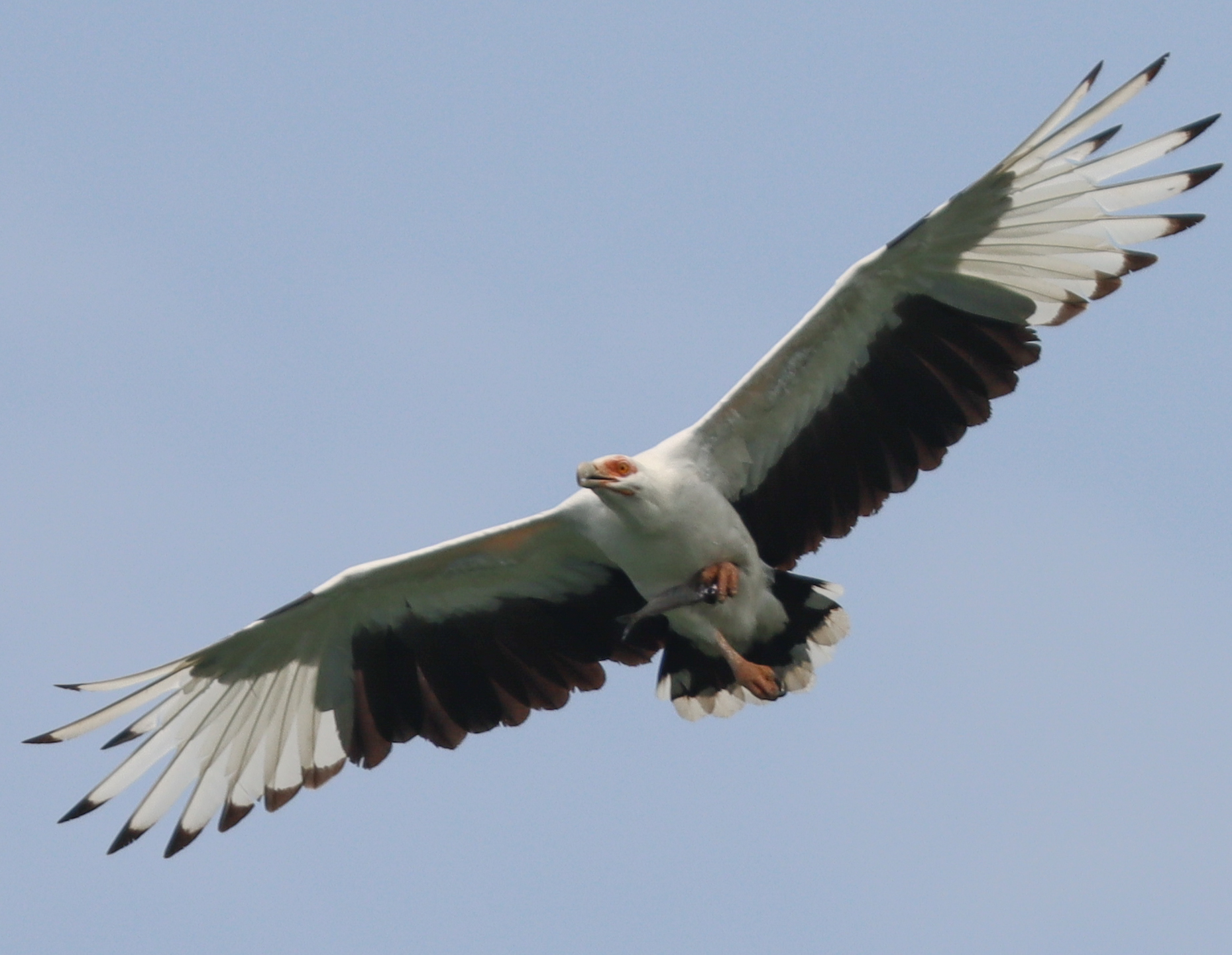
With a fish in its talons, in Tanzania

Unusual for birds of prey, the palm-nut vulture feeds mainly on the fleshy fruit-husks of the oil palm and on the palm-fruits of Raffia palms, as well as wild dates, oranges, other fruits, some grains and acacia seeds. These fruits make up over 60% of the adult bird's diet and over 90% of the juvenile bird's diet. It has also been recorded to feed on crabs (both freshwater and marine), molluscs, frogs, tadpoles, fish, dung beetles, termites, alate ants, alate termites, locusts, small mammals, birds and their nestlings, snakes, other reptiles, even reptiles’ eggs and hatchlings, and it has been known to occasionally attack domestic poultry and feed on carrion.

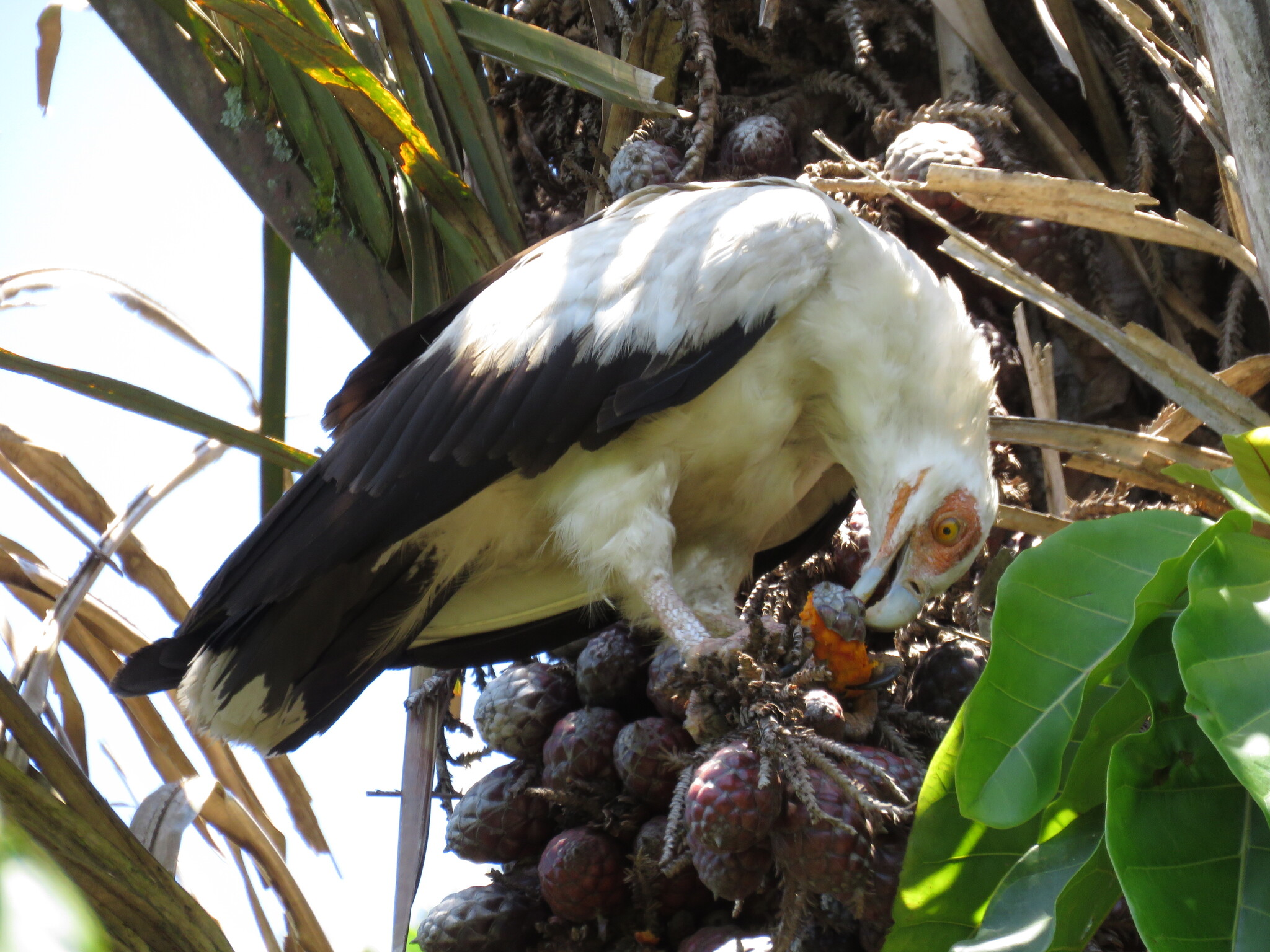
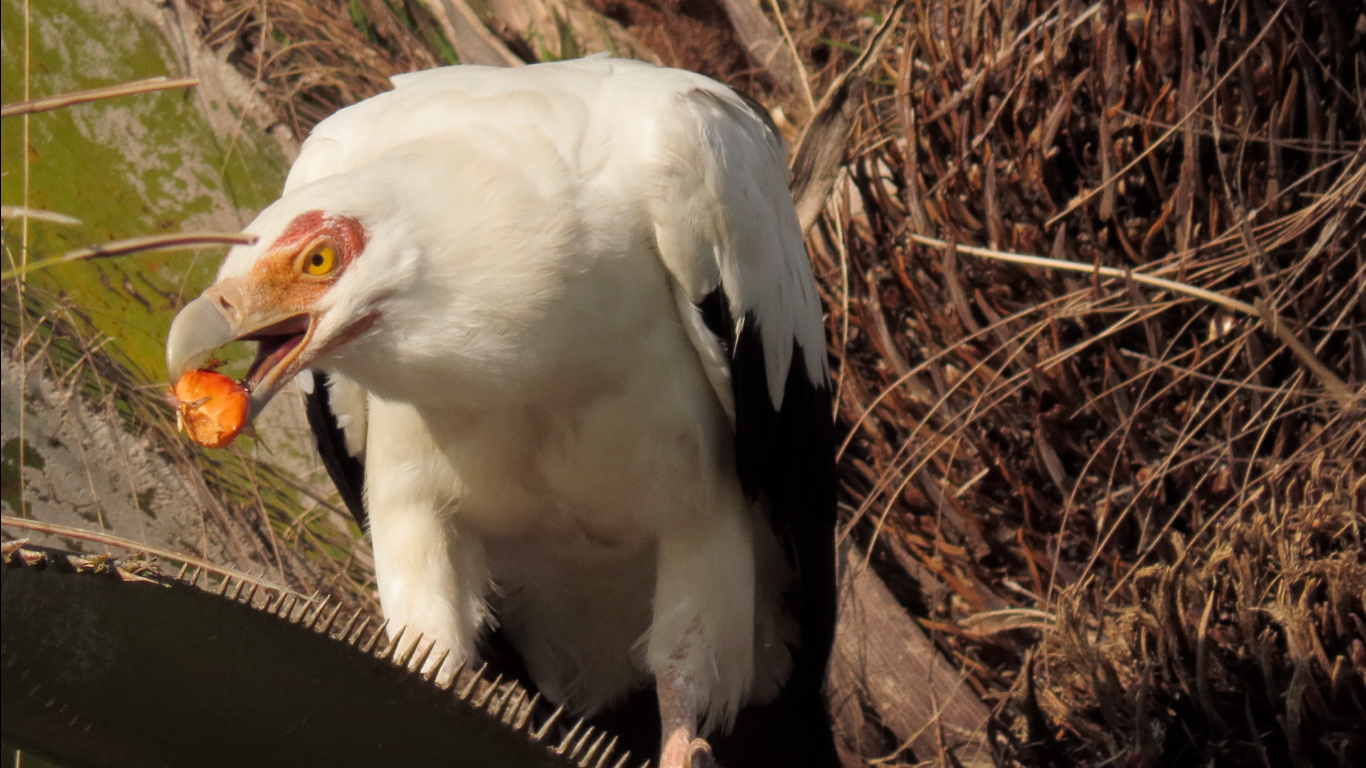
Feeding on fruit, in South Africa (left) and Uganda (right)

=== Breeding ===
Breeding pairs construct large stick nests high up in tall trees and will often exhibit a strong attachment to the nest site. They may stay at the nesting site for an entire year. Where Raphia Palms are present, breeding pairs will build a nest at the base of the palm fronds. At the beginning of the breeding season, pairs soar together in an aerial display of rolling and diving, much more acrobatic than most vultures. During each breeding cycle, a single, white and brown egg is laid, which is incubated by both sexes, over a period of four to six weeks. Normally around 85 to 90 days after hatching, the young brown chicks will fledge.

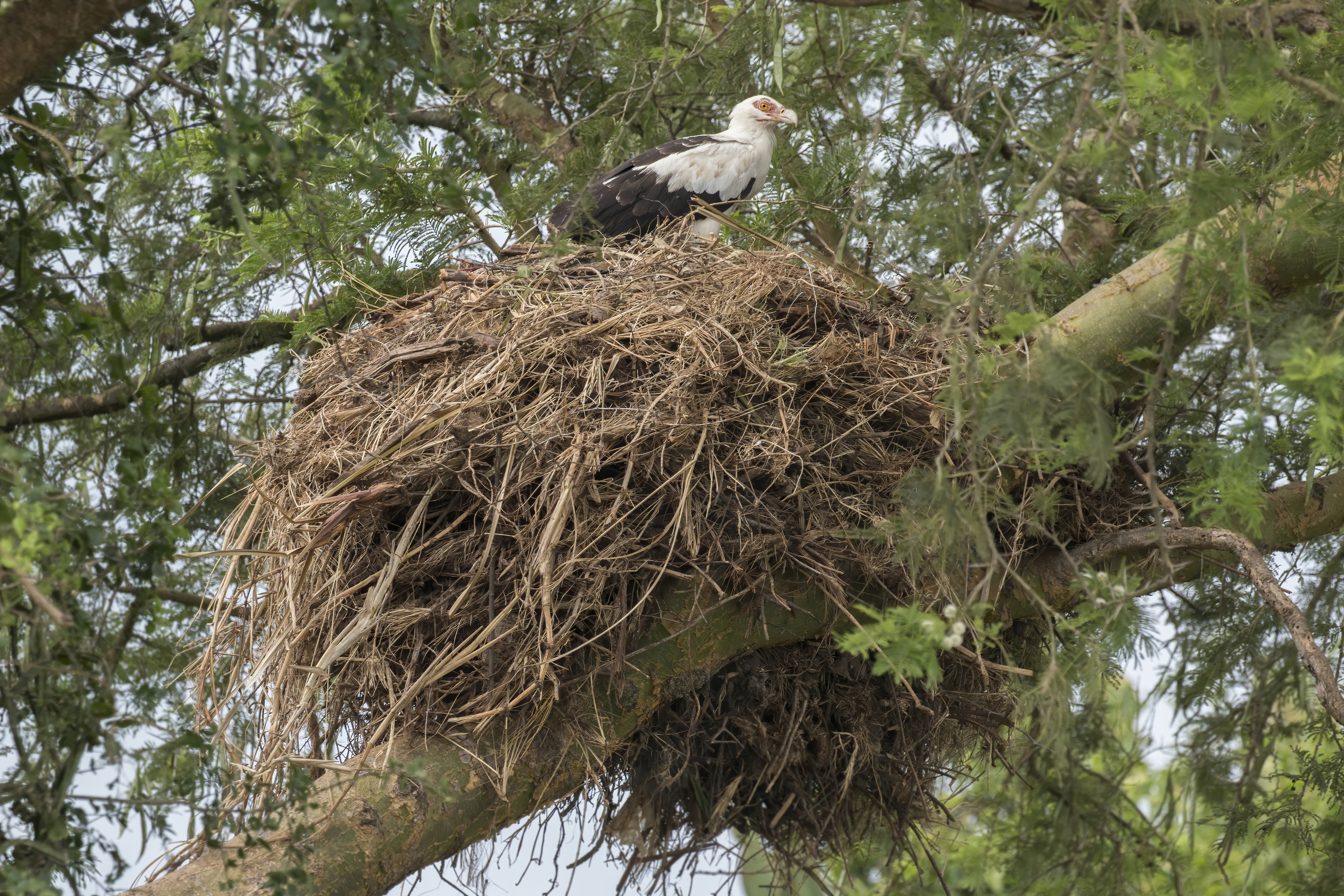
Adult on nest at Kazinga Channel, Uganda

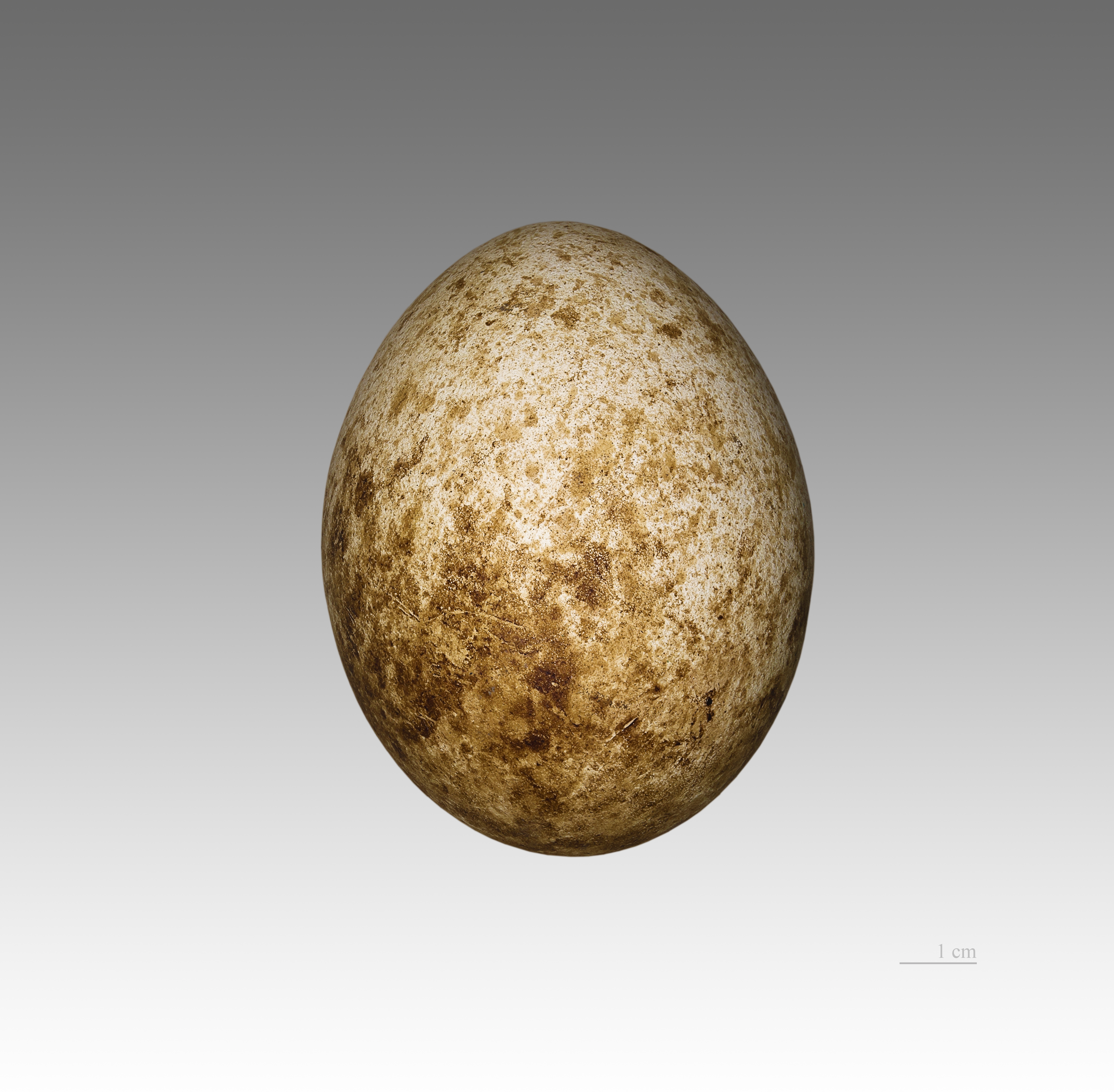
Egg

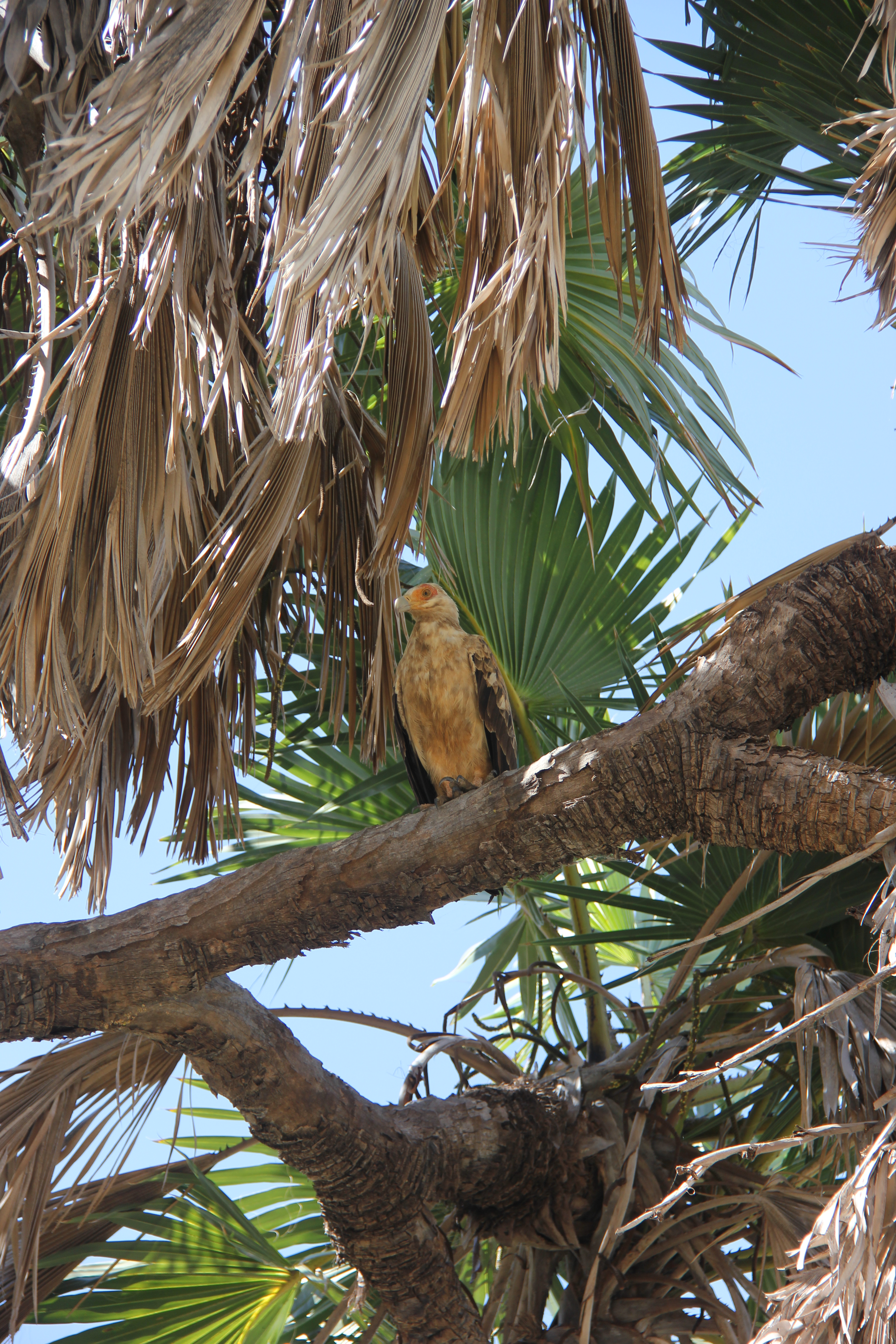
Immature bird in Selous Game Reserve, Tanzania

== Conservation status ==
This species is widespread throughout much of Africa, overall fairly common and with a stable population. It is rarer and much more localized in South Africa, although not considered to be under any form of immediate threat in that country. That being said, the threats to this species in South Africa are not well understood. The low population size makes the species vulnerable to stochastic events. In Mozambique Parker (1999) observed that cutting down of coastal forest was threatening breeding habitat. The main threat to this species in South Africa is habitat loss. Open cast sand dune mining and urban expansion have reduced suitable habitats.

The cultivation of Raphia palms for their ornamental value is currently increasing providing food and nesting sites. There is also a large portion of its habitat protected by the Isimangaliso Wetland Park. There are no current species specific conservation initiatives as this species is the only vulture species in South Africa where the population size is increasing. The importance of maintaining this is that the South African satellite population in producing dispersing birds that are contributing to maintaining the Mozambique population (and hence the larger metapopulation).
