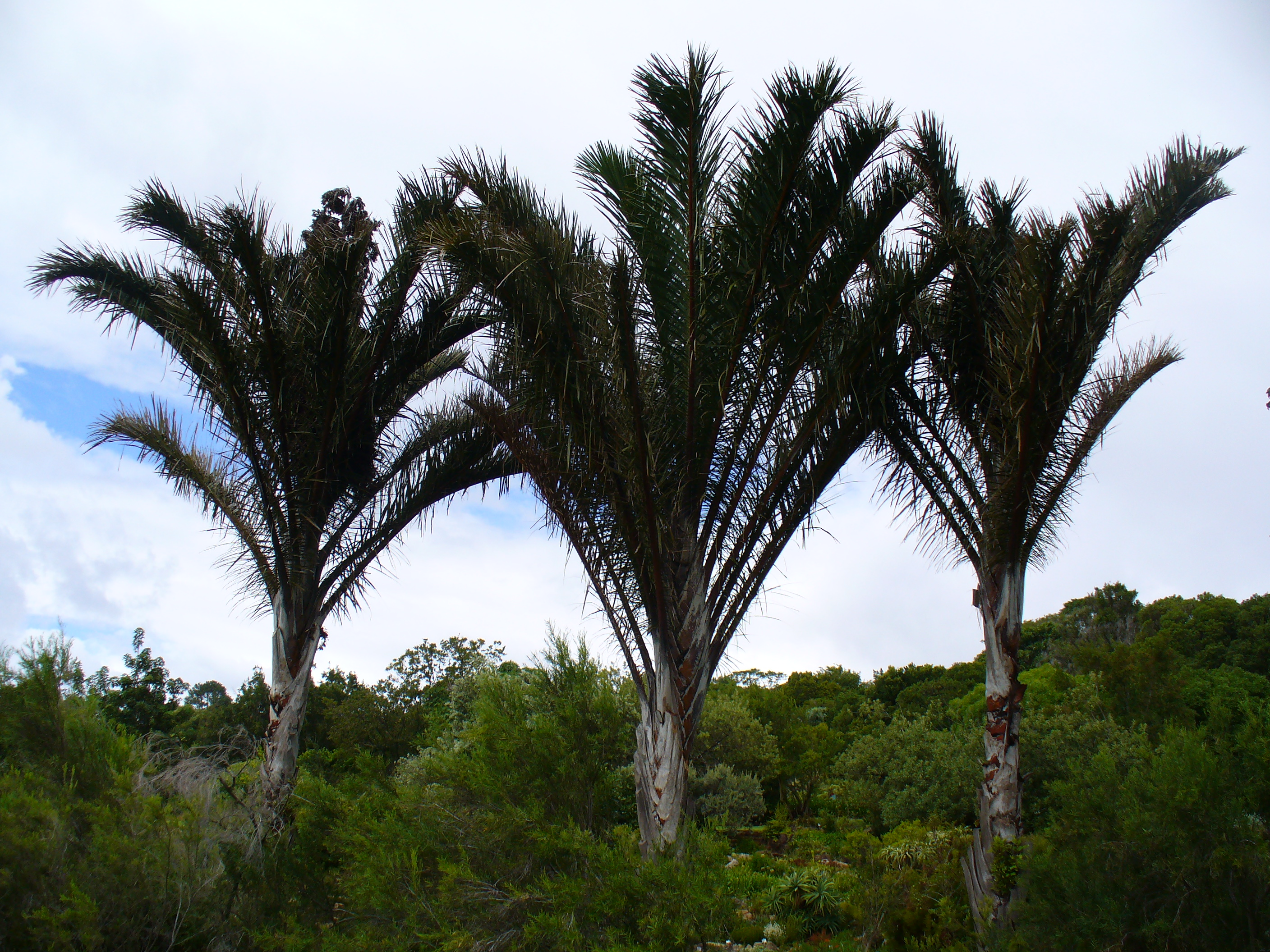

Conservation status
- Vulnerable (IUCN 3.1)

Scientific classification
- Kingdom: Plantae
- Clade: Embryophytes
- Clade: Tracheophytes
- Clade: Spermatophytes
- Clade: Angiosperms
- Clade: Monocots
- Clade: Commelinids
- Order: Arecales
- Family: Arecaceae
- Genus: Raphia
- Species: R. australis

Binomial name
- Raphia australis Oberm. & Strey

= Raphia australis =

Species of palm

Raphia australis, the giant palm, Kosi Palm, or rafia, is a species of raffia palm in the family Arecaceae. It is found around Kosi Bay in southern Mozambique and northeastern KwaZulu Natal in South Africa. It is threatened by habitat loss caused by drainage of its habitat for agriculture; it is being threatened in the Bobole Special Reserve but is more secure in the Kosi Bay area.

== Description ==
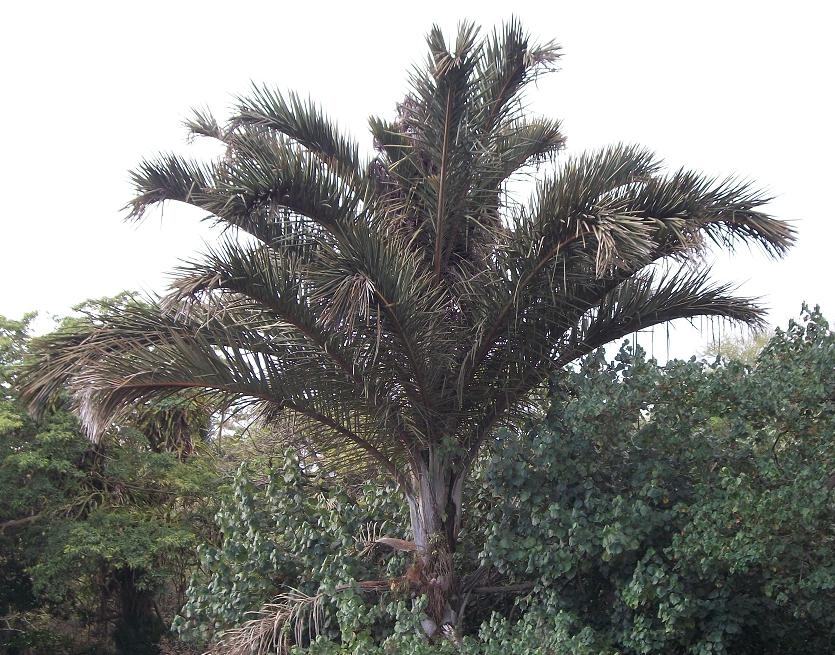
Raphia australis

Raphia australis is a large palm with a single trunk, growing to a height of 24 m (80 ft). The crown of 9 m (30 ft) leaves are long and arching, the bases of the leaf stalks sheathing the trunk. The leaves are pinnate, the centre stem or rachis being robust and brown, while the leaflets have a single fold and are shiny green above and waxy and bluish-green below. The main veins and the margins of the leaflets are spiny. This palm was for a long time thought to be the same species as Raphia vinifera, but that has proven not to be the case, the most obvious difference being that the flower stems of R. australis are erect while those of R. vinifera dangle downwards.

== Distribution and habitat ==
Raphia australis is endemic to Gaza Province in southern Mozambique and near Kwangwanase at Kosi Bay in KwaZulu Natal in South Africa. There are four subpopulations, the largest one being at Manhiça District in Mozambique where there are about 4,000 mature individuals. This palm grows in swamps, peat bogs and seasonally flooded dunes.

== Ecology ==
Raphia australis flowers when it is between twenty and forty years old, sets fruit and dies, although the dying process may take up to three years. The tree has specialised aerial roots known as pneumatophores to help it to breathe. The seeds are eaten and dispersed by the palm-nut vulture, which is widespread in other coastal regions of Africa but in southern Africa only occurs in association with this palm.
