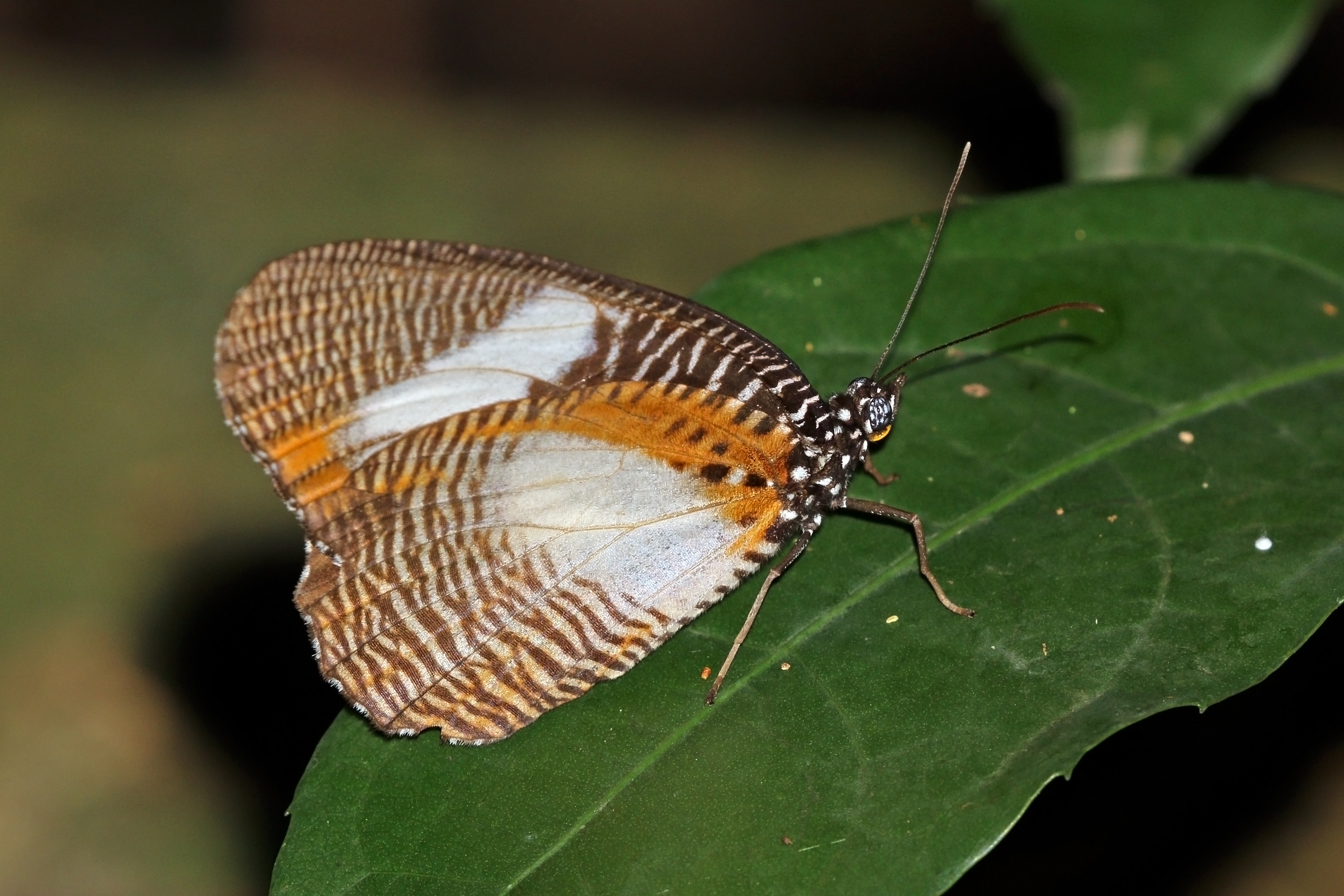
- Elymniopsis bammakoo bammakoo, Ghana
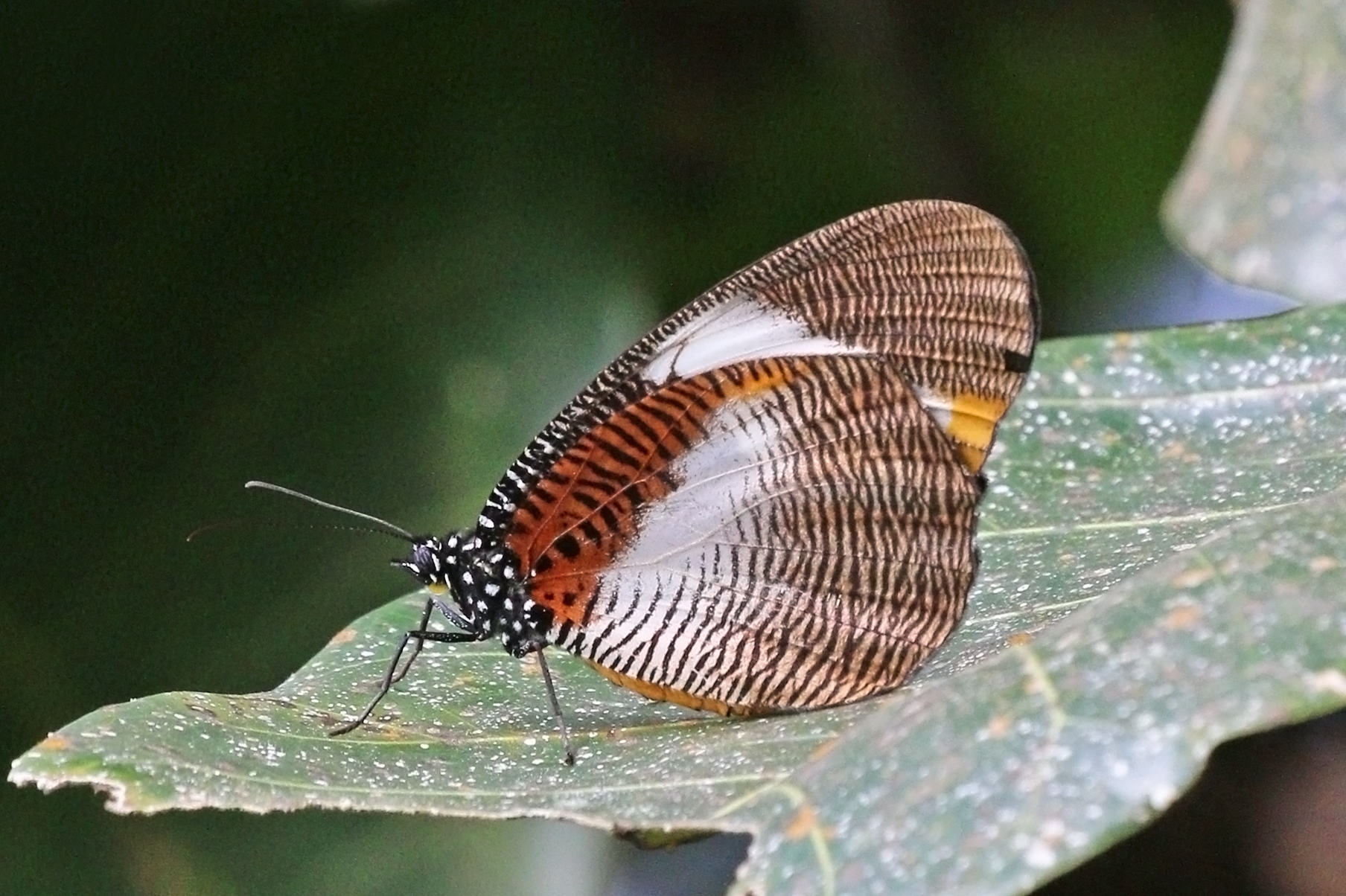
- Elymniopsis bammakoo rattrayi, Kibale Forest, Uganda

Scientific classification
- Kingdom: Animalia
- Phylum: Arthropoda
- Clade: Pancrustacea
- Class: Insecta
- Order: Lepidoptera
- Family: Nymphalidae
- Tribe: Elymniini
- Genus: Elymniopsis; Fruhstorfer, 1907
- Species: E. bammakoo

Binomial name
- Elymniopsis bammakoo (Westwood, [1851])

Synonyms
- Melanitis bammakoo Westwood, [1851]; Elymnias bammakoo; Papilio phegea Fabricius, 1793; Elymnias phegea var. intermedia Aurivillius, 1899; Elymnias phegea ab. angustata Bartel, 1905; Elymniopsis bammakoo var. hybrida Niepelt, 1915; Papilio lise Hemming, 1960; Elymnias rattrayi Sharpe, 1902; Elymnias bammakoo rattrayi; Elymnias ugandae Grünberg, 1908

= Elymniopsis =

Genus of butterflies

Elymniopsis is a monotypic butterfly genus in the family Nymphalidae. It contains only one species, Elymniopsis bammakoo, the African palmfly.

== Range and habitat ==
It is found in Senegal, Sierra Leone, Liberia, Ivory Coast, Ghana, Togo, Nigeria, Cameroon, Gabon, the Republic of the Congo, the Central African Republic, Angola, the DRC, Uganda and Tanzania. The habitat consists of forests.

== Description ==
Adults resemble Acraea poggei in flight. The white form of bammakoo mimics the female of Papilio cynorta.

== Food ==
Adults are attracted to fermented bananas and have also been recorded imbibing sap from wounds in trees. The larvae feed on Elaeis guineensis, Phoenix reclinata and Raphia hookeri.

== Subspecies ==
- Elymniopsis bammakoo bammakoo

Range: Senegal, Sierra Leone, Liberia, Ivory Coast, Ghana, Togo, Nigeria, Cameroon, Gabon, Congo, Central African Republic, Angola, DRC

- Elymniopsis bammakoo rattrayi (Sharpe, 1902)

Range: eastern DRC, western Uganda, north-western Tanzania

Torben Larsen developed a species numbering system for his 2005 publication Butterflies of West Africa. The nominate subspecies is #661. The 'Larsen' numbers have since been used with permission in A Sharp Eye on Butterflies of Ghana.

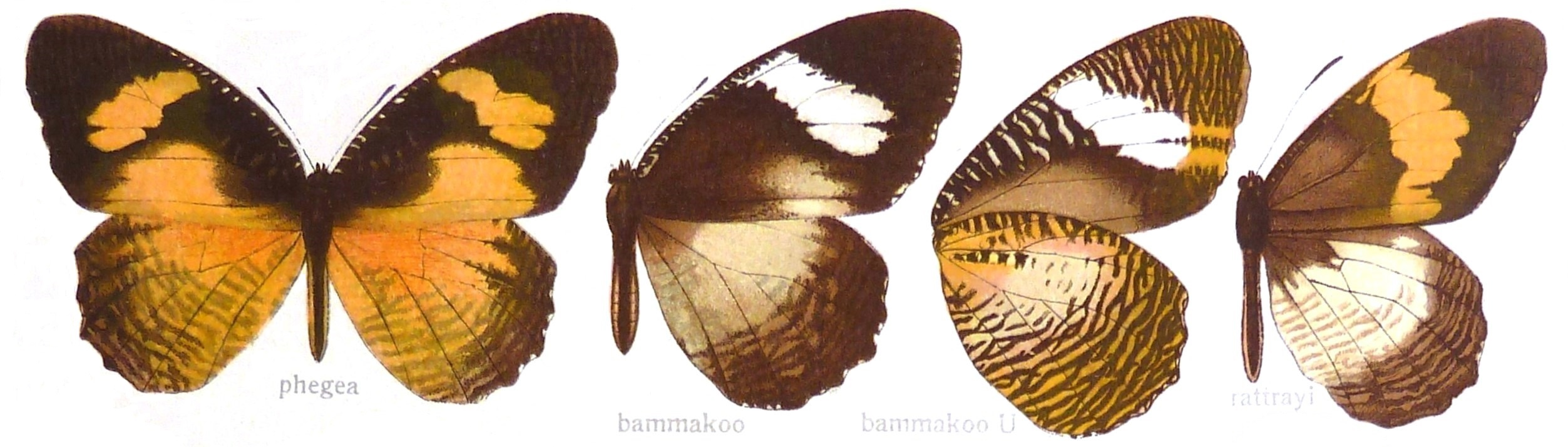
Elymniopsis bammakoo bammakoo & Elymniopsis bammakoo rattrayi (far right)
