= Mugomba Central Forest Reserve =

Forest reserve in Uganda

Mugomba Central Forest Reserve is a 100-hectare (247-acre) forest reserve located in Entebbe, Central Uganda. It is part of the Central Forest Reserves of Uganda, which are managed by the National Forestry Authority (NFA).

== Setting and geography ==
Mugomba Central Forest Reserve is located between 320 30`E and 000 15` at an elevation of 1220m, in Mpigi District, Entebbe Sub-District, Busiro County. Mugomba Forest Reserve, a permanent swamp forest, lies north east of Entebbe Town at about 10 km from the town along Kisubi - Nakawuka road. About 100ha of the Mugomba Forest Reserve is covered by an extensive rocky area which is covered with very thin soil layer which can only permit growth of grasses.

Mugomba Forest Reserve is located about 15 kilometers from Entebbe. The reserve is mostly swampy and rural in nature, with a small population. The woodland has been sold. As a result, access by local inhabitants is now limited, as it was during the first visit and first revisit. However, the harvesting of the few remaining trees was noticed. The community, particularly the youth, continues to rely on the forest reserve for brick burning.

One major road runs along the reserve's boundary, connecting the Entebbe-Kampala route to the nearby communities. R. Mugomba and its tributaries, R. Lumpewo and R. Namasuga, run through the reserve. The external boundary of Mugomba forest reserve is clearly marked with corner Cairns. Nevertheless, some of the corner cairns have been removed by agricultural encroachers

== Biodiversity ==
The Mugomba Forest Reserve is home to a wide range of plant and animal life, including chimps, elephants, and several bird species. It also serves as a vital source of water for the nearby villages. Maesopsis eminii, Lovoa brownii, Trichilia dregeana, and Pseudospondias macrcarpa are among the species. Although Mugomba Forest Reserve is a permanent swamp forest with Mitrogyna stipulosa as the dominating species, Raphia farinifera has taken over.

In recent years, the forest reserve has been degraded by human activity, including logging, agricultural encroachment, and charcoal burning. In 2018, the NFA launched a tree-planting campaign to restore the forest reserve. The Mugomba Forest Reserve is an important part of the environment and economy of Uganda. It is a vital source of water, biodiversity, and recreation. The NFA is working to restore the forest reserve and protect it from further degradation.

== History ==
The Mugomba Forest Reserve was gazetted in 1933. It was originally established to protect the water catchment area for the nearby Lake Victoria. The forest reserve is also home to a variety of plant and animal life, including chimpanzees, elephants, and a number of bird species.

== Degradation and Restoration ==
In recent years, the Mugomba Forest Reserve has been degraded by human activity, including logging, agricultural encroachment, and charcoal burning. The NFA estimates that over 50% of the forest reserve has been lost in the past 20 years.

Mugomba Forest Reserve has been over harvested and degraded for commercial firewood, charcoal and to a less extent timber. There has also been agricultural encroachment for the growing of food crops such cassava and sweet potatoes, as well as clay mining by brick makers. Mugomba Forest Reserve was leased to local communities for the creation of private woodlots due to excessive degradation. The arable land is currently cultivated with Eucalyptus grandis species, creating a peri-urban plantation forest.

The forest reserve's quality has decreased. Due to ongoing forest degradation and a lack of financial support to facilitate patrolling and ensure tree planting in the reserve, the then Forest Department, which is now NFA, decided to divide the reserve into 5 hectare plots and lease these plots to individual farmers for tree planting. The current lease term is five years. Some farmers have responded well. As a result, a new monoculture crop is currently developing in arable areas that are not swamped.

In 2018, the NFA launched a tree-planting campaign to restore the Mugomba Forest Reserve. The campaign aims to plant 1 million trees in the forest reserve over a period of five years. The NFA is also working to raise awareness of the importance of the forest reserve and to prevent further degradation. The Mugomba Forest Reserve is an important part of the environment and economy of Uganda. It is a vital source of water, biodiversity, and recreation. The NFA is working to restore the forest reserve and protect it from further degradation.

Access to these corner positions can still be observed with the assistance of local residents. Mugomba Forest Reserve is classified as a production forest. Because of the reserve's marshy character, tree replacement/recruitment looks to be slower, tree growth appears to be slower, and tree death rate is high owing to water logged environment that limits tree germination, vigor, and health.
