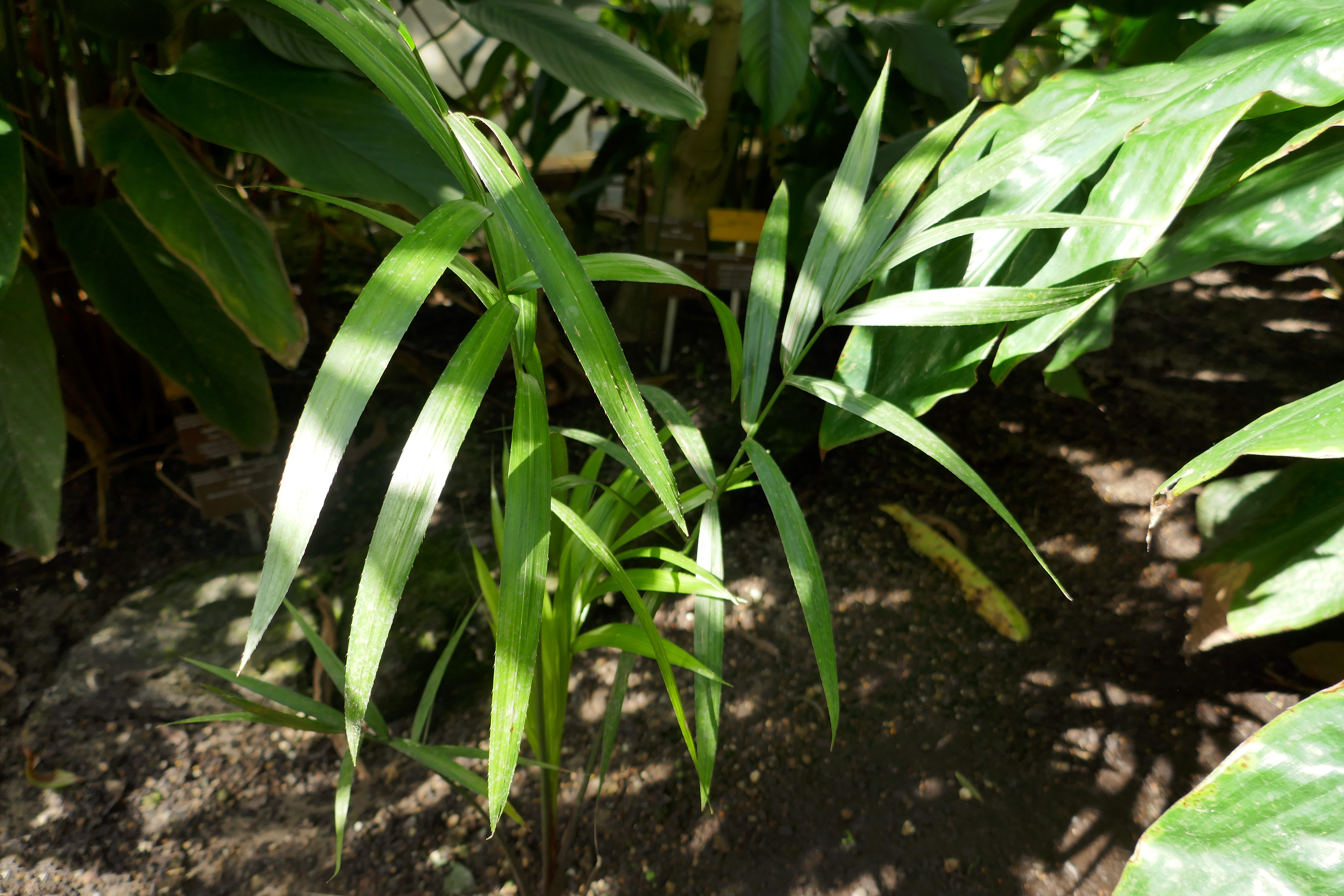

Conservation status
- Near Threatened (IUCN 3.1)

Scientific classification
- Kingdom: Plantae
- Clade: Tracheophytes
- Clade: Angiosperms
- Clade: Monocots
- Clade: Commelinids
- Order: Arecales
- Family: Arecaceae
- Genus: Raphia
- Species: R. sudanica

Binomial name
- Raphia sudanica A.Chev.

Synonyms
- Raphia bandamensis A.Chev. Raphia heberostris Becc. Raphia humilis A.Chev.

= Raphia sudanica =

Species of palm

Raphia sudanica is a palm species in the family Arecaceae. It is found in Western Africa, where it is locally used for construction purposes.
