= Piassava =

Fibrous product of Brazilian palm species Attalea funifera and Leopoldinia piassaba

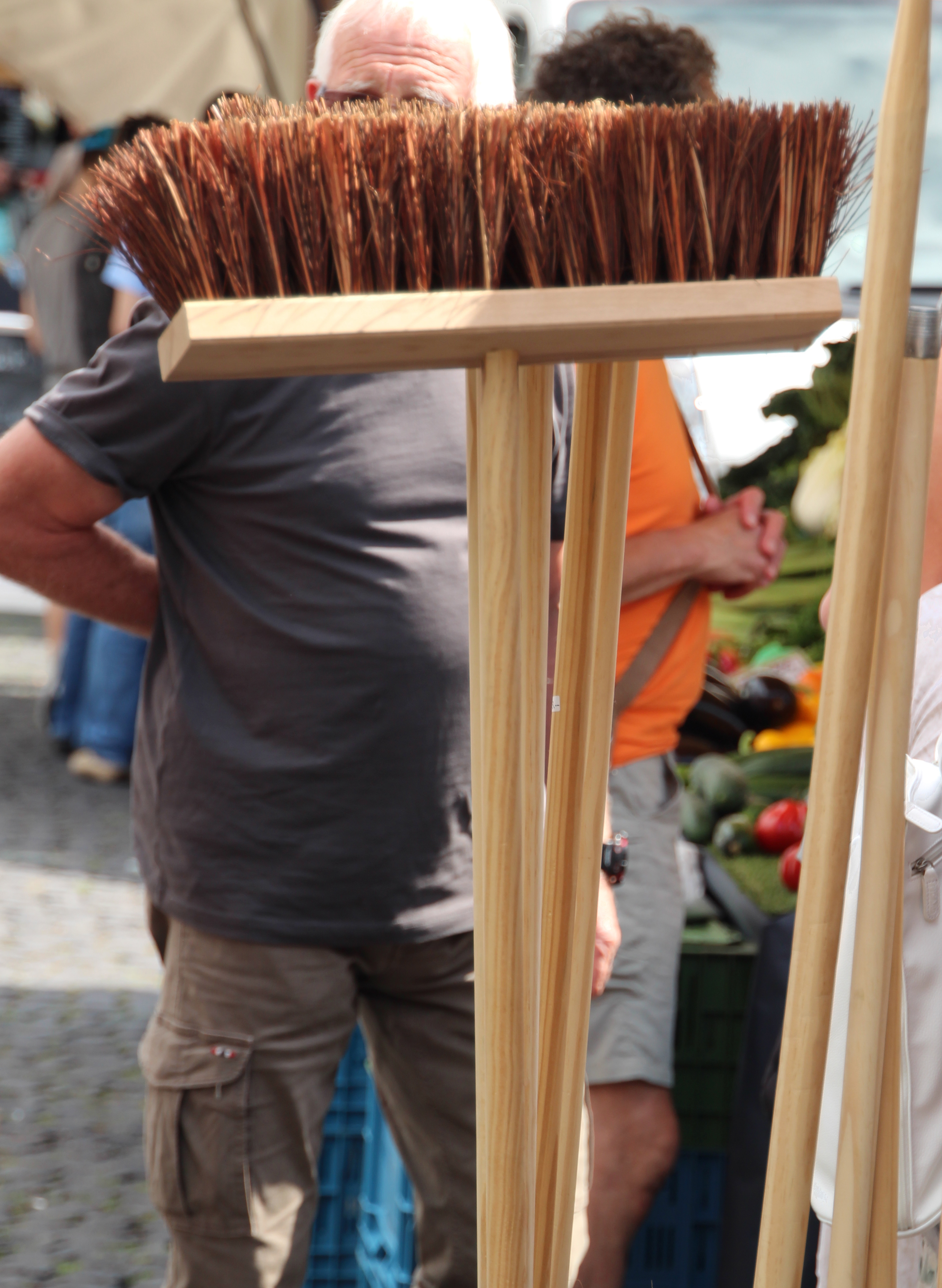
Piassava broom at a market

Piassava, also piaçava (Portuguese pronunciation: [pi.(j)ɐˈsavɐ]), piaçaba ([pi.(j)ɐˈsabɐ]), piasaba, pissaba, piassaba, and piaçá ([pjɐˈsa]), is a fibrous product of Brazilian palm species Attalea funifera and Leopoldinia piassaba. It is often used in making brooms and for other purposes.

Piassava was historically exported to Europe before the widespread use of synthetic materials such as plastic. Today, it is mostly used locally in South America.

== See also ==
- West African piassava palm
