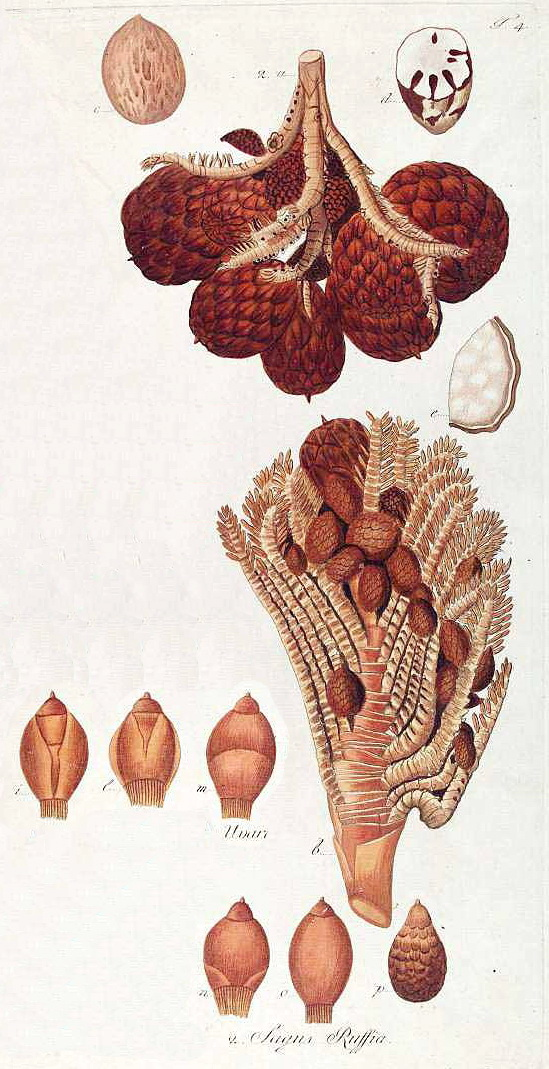
- Raphia farinifera fruits

Scientific classification
- Kingdom: Plantae
- Clade: Tracheophytes
- Clade: Angiosperms
- Clade: Monocots
- Clade: Commelinids
- Order: Arecales
- Family: Arecaceae
- Genus: Raphia
- Species: R. farinifera

Binomial name
- Raphia farinifera (Gaertn.) Hyl.

Synonyms
- List: Metroxylon ruffia (Jacq.) Spreng.; Raphia kirkii Engl. ex Becc.; Raphia kirkii var. grandis Engl. ex Becc.; Raphia kirkii var. longicarpa Engl. ex Becc.; Raphia lyciosa Comm. ex Kunth; Raphia pedunculata P.Beauv.; Raphia polymita Comm. ex Kunth; Raphia ruffia (Jacq.) Mart.; Raphia tamatavensis Sadeb.; Sagus farinifera Gaertn.; Sagus pedunculata (P.Beauv.) Poir.; Sagus ruffia Jacq.

= Raphia farinifera =

Species of palm

Raphia farinifera is a tropical African palm tree occurring in lowland riparian and swamp forest, also around human habitations and cultivated locations, on stream banks and other moist situations at altitudes of 50–1000 m. Found in Angola, Benin, Burkina Faso, Cameroon, Gambia, Ghana, Guinea, Ivory Coast, Kenya, Madagascar, Malawi, Mauritius, Mozambique, Nigeria, Réunion, Senegal, Seychelles, Sierra Leone, Tanzania, Togo, Uganda, Zambia and Zimbabwe, and naturalised in east lowlands of Madagascar. Its generic epithet is derived from raphis = 'needle', probably in reference to the 4 mm long yellowish spines on the margins and main veins of the leaflets. The specific name refers to a type of starchy flour obtained from the trunk pith – farina = 'flour', fera = 'bearing'.

It is one of 26 species of the genus Raphia currently recognised, all native to Africa and Madagascar, with one species, R. taedigera also found in Central and South America. Their fronds, botanically a single leaf, are among the longest in the plant kingdom, those of R. regalis reaching a length of 25 m.

The trunk of this species is up to 10 m tall and about 1 m in diameter – the topmost fronds reach up a further 10 m – and sheathed in persistent leaf bases. Trees occur singly or, because of suckering, in dense clumps. The pendant inflorescences are massive, up to 3.3 m (11 ft) long, and up to 35 cm (14 in) thick. | bearing unisexual flowers – male flowers at the distal end, female flowers at proximal – with first order branches of 13–32 rachillae very close-packed in almost one plane (see illustration). Raphia spp. are monocarpic or hapaxanthic, flowering and fruiting only once, followed by death. Raphia farinifera flowers when the tree is some 20–25 years old, and it takes a further 5–6 years from flowering to ripe fruit, all fruits ripening together. The fruit is oblong to ovoid, 5–10 cm in length, with imbricate, glossy, golden-brown scales. Like all Raphia species, it displays the very rare 1/4 phyllotaxy.

== Uses ==
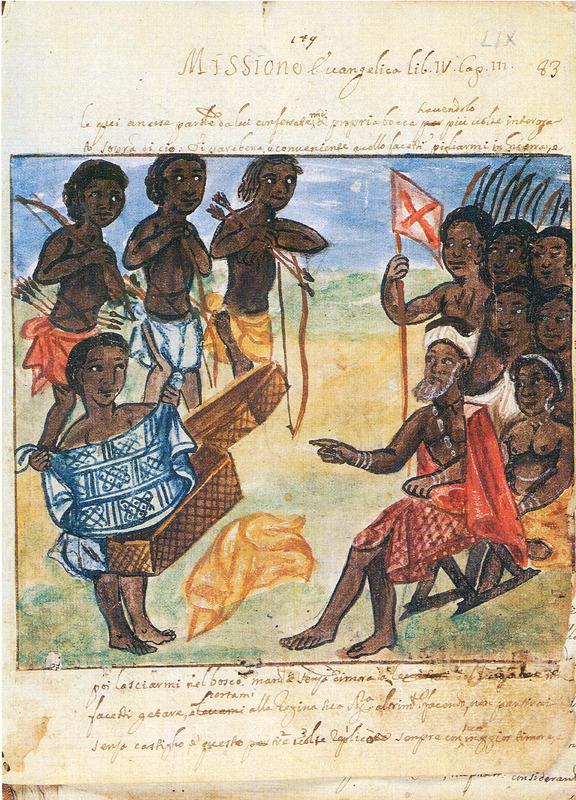
Raffia textiles being traded to a Kongo nobleman by Giovanni Cavazzi da Montecuccolo (circa. 1650)

This species is strongly associated with human migration throughout the tropics, leaves being used for thatching, the leaflets for plaiting, and the midribs being a useful material for hut construction, furniture, fences, sweeping-brushes, floats for fishing nets, ladders and poles. The epidermis on the upper surfaces of young leaflets yields raffia, a strong, commercially important fibre, used as cordage in horticulture and handicrafts, and in weaving hats, baskets, mats, shoes, bags, fishing nets, hammocks, curtains and textiles. The midveins of the leaflets are used to construct fishing nets and articles for domestic use. The terminal portion of the core is eaten as a vegetable. The young inflorescences are tapped for a sugary sap which lessens flowering and hastens death. The sap is turned into palm wine, and either further distilled into strong alcohol or used as baking yeast. Fruit pulp is also turned into an alcoholic beverage. Oil extracted from the mesocarp (24%) and seed (1%), and sometimes marketed as 'bamboo oil', produces raphia butter, and soap and stearin. The hard outer shell of the fruit is used for making snuffboxes and buttons, or simply for ornamentation. Wax derived from the lower surfaces of the leaflets is turned into floor and shoe polish, and candles. It is frequently cultivated, as in Nigeria, Madagascar, Seychelles, Réunion, India, United States and Lesser Antilles, and as a consequence often becomes naturalised.

=== Medicinal ===
Preparations of the root are used against toothache. Fibres taken from the leaf sheath are taken against digestive disorders, and fermented sap from the inflorescence serves as a laxative. A decoction of the fruit pulp is used as a treatment for dysentery, and an infusion of fruit staunches haemorrhaging.

=== Physical ===
Raffia fibres have proved to be supple and strong, making them well-suited as a binding material in the horticulture trade. Since it is easily split it may readily be prepared in standard widths. Its readiness to absorb dyes makes it ideal for use in fancy items. The fibres have a high tensile strength of 500 N/mm^{2}.

=== Chemical ===
The most important fatty acids in seed oil are palmitic acid, oleic acid and linoleic acid, while the main sterol is β-sitosterol. An extract of the stem bark proved to be toxic to microfilariae of Onchocerca volvulus, the cause of river blindness.

== Gallery ==
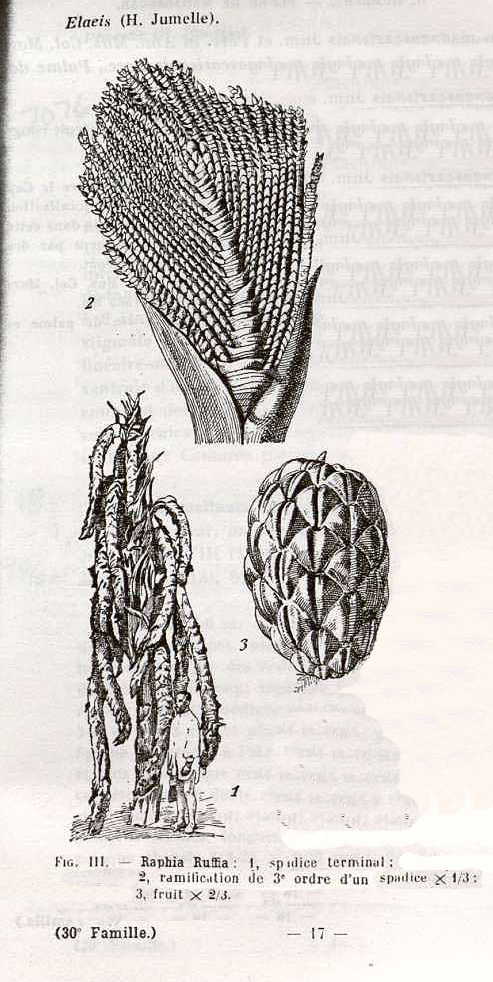
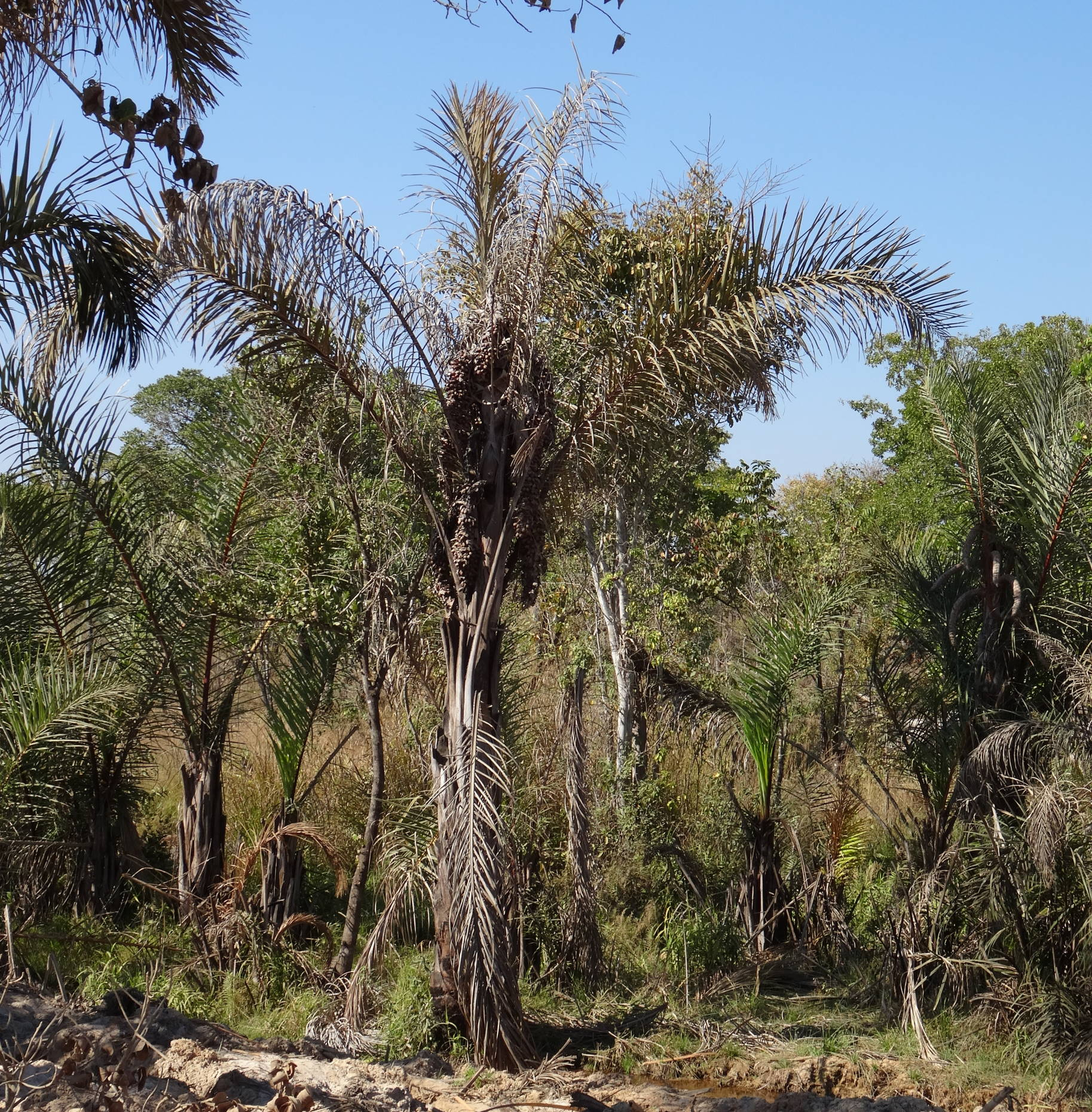
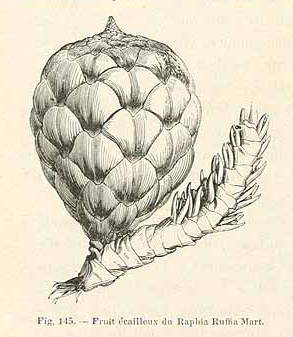
