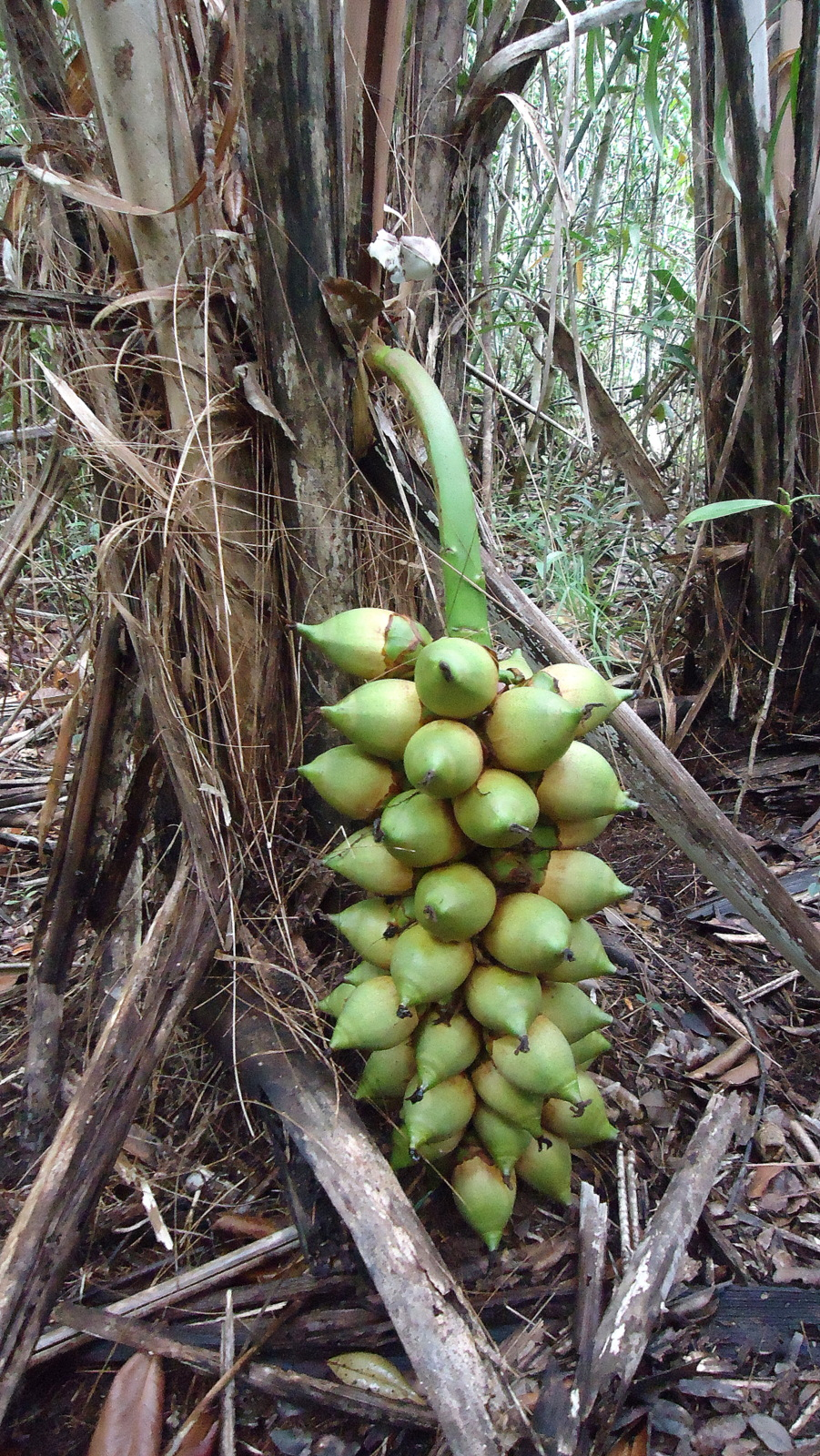
- Infructescence
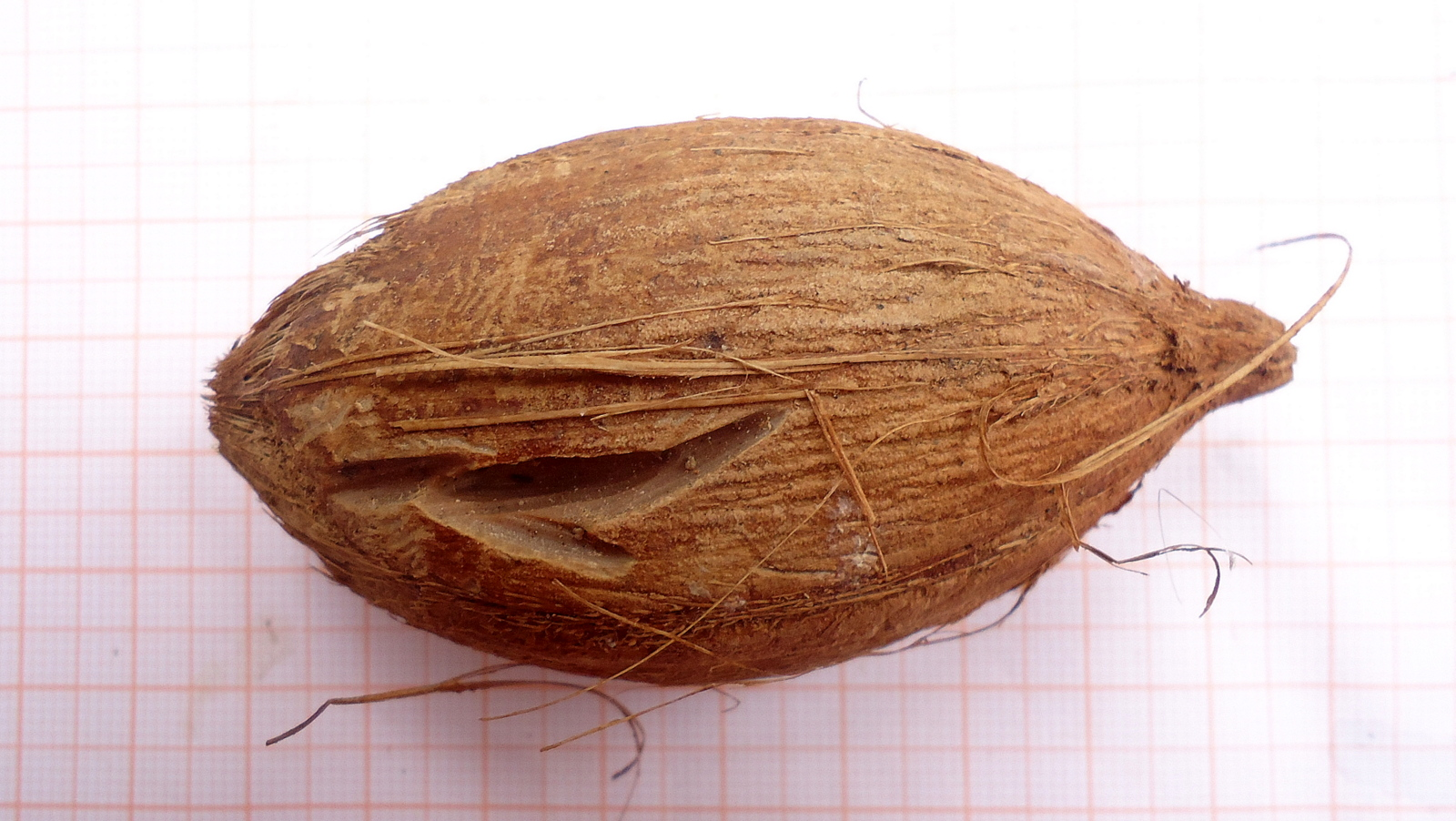
- Nut

Scientific classification
- Kingdom: Plantae
- Clade: Tracheophytes
- Clade: Angiosperms
- Clade: Monocots
- Clade: Commelinids
- Order: Arecales
- Family: Arecaceae
- Genus: Attalea
- Species: A. funifera

Binomial name
- Attalea funifera Mart.

Synonyms
- Attalea acaulis Burret; Sarinia funifera (Mart.) O.F.Cook

= Attalea funifera =

Species of plant in the family Arecaceae

Attalea funifera, the Bahia piassava, is a species of palm (family Arecaceae), native to eastern Brazil. It is a major source of piassava fiber, used in brooms and brushes.
