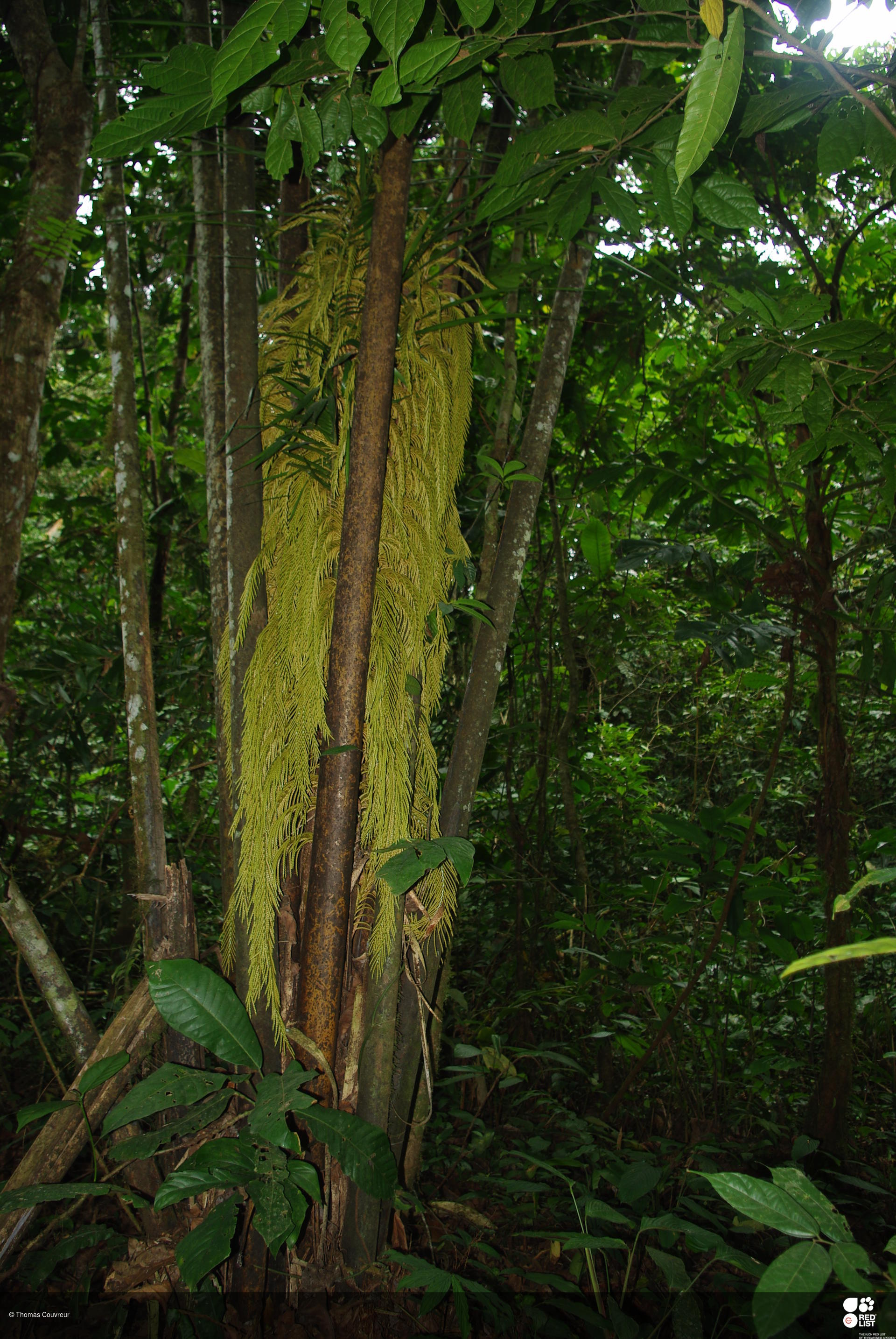
- inflorescences

Conservation status
- Least Concern (IUCN 3.1)

Scientific classification
- Kingdom: Plantae
- Clade: Tracheophytes
- Clade: Angiosperms
- Clade: Monocots
- Clade: Commelinids
- Order: Arecales
- Family: Arecaceae
- Genus: Raphia
- Species: R. regalis

Binomial name
- Raphia regalis Becc.

= Raphia regalis =

Species of palm

Raphia regalis is a species of flowering plant in the palm family Arecaceae. It is found in Angola, Cameroon, Republic of the Congo, Gabon, and Nigeria. Its natural habitat is subtropical or tropical moist lowland forests. It is threatened by habitat loss. Raphia regalis has extraordinarily large leaves. Botanist/ecologist Francis Halle encountered a specimen in the Republic of Congo bearing a frond 25.91 m (85.0 ft) total length, of which 16.47 m (54.0 ft) is the blade or lamina while 9.44 m (31.0 ft) is the stalk or petiole, of which 80 cm (31 in) was below soil level. This is the second longest petiole to be reported after Musa ingens. These near-vertical fronds are arranged in the very rare 1/4 phyllotaxy.

== Description ==
Raphia regalis is an evergreen palm with an underground trunk, giving it the appearance of being stemless. The true trunk, rarely exceeding a metre in length, remains buried beneath the soil. Towering above it, the plant produces enormous, arching leaves that can grow beyond 20 m, making them the largest known foliage in the plant kingdom.

These massive pinnate leaves emerge from a central base, each bearing around 180 leaflets per side. The leaflets reach widths of up to 6.5 cm, displaying a deep green upper surface with a waxy, grayish-white underside. Unlike many other Raphia species, which often feature prominent spines along the leaflets, Raphia regalis has only sparse, subtle spines. When the leaves die, they remain attached to the plant rather than falling away.

The palm tree follows a long vegetative phase before flowering, often taking years to reach maturity. Once ready, a rapid growth surge extends the trunk-like axis upwards to over 4 m, culminating in the production of large, complex, and highly branched inflorescences. These floral structures, which can stretch up to 3 m long, are unique within the genus for their upright orientation.

Being monoecious, Raphia regalis bears both male and female flowers on the same plant. These reddish flowers have pointed, slightly prickly tips. The palm produces sizable fruits, typically ovoid with a tapering base, measuring up to 9.5 cm long. Their outer surface is adorned with glossy, overlapping scales arranged in symmetrical rows. Within each fruit, a spindle-shaped or curved seed is enclosed.

Like many other Raphia species, this palm releases a large quantity of seeds, sometimes leading to dense clusters of saplings. Its fruit attract various animals, which likely contribute to seed dispersal. As in other species of Raphia, it is monocarpic, with a single reproductive event before dying.
