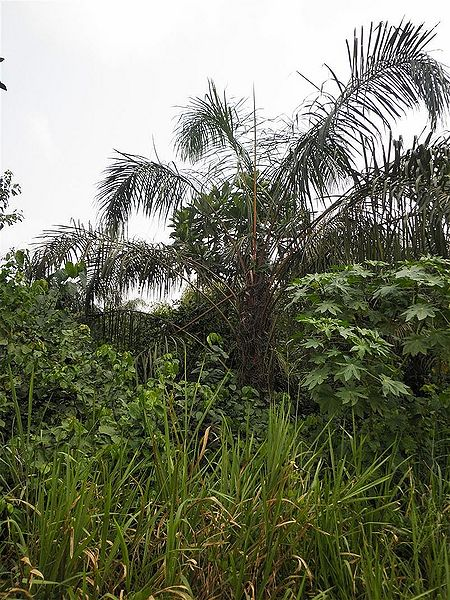

Scientific classification
- Kingdom: Plantae
- Clade: Tracheophytes
- Clade: Angiosperms
- Clade: Monocots
- Clade: Commelinids
- Order: Arecales
- Family: Arecaceae
- Genus: Raphia
- Species: R. hookeri

Binomial name
- Raphia hookeri G.Mann & H.Wendl.

= Raphia hookeri =

Species of palm

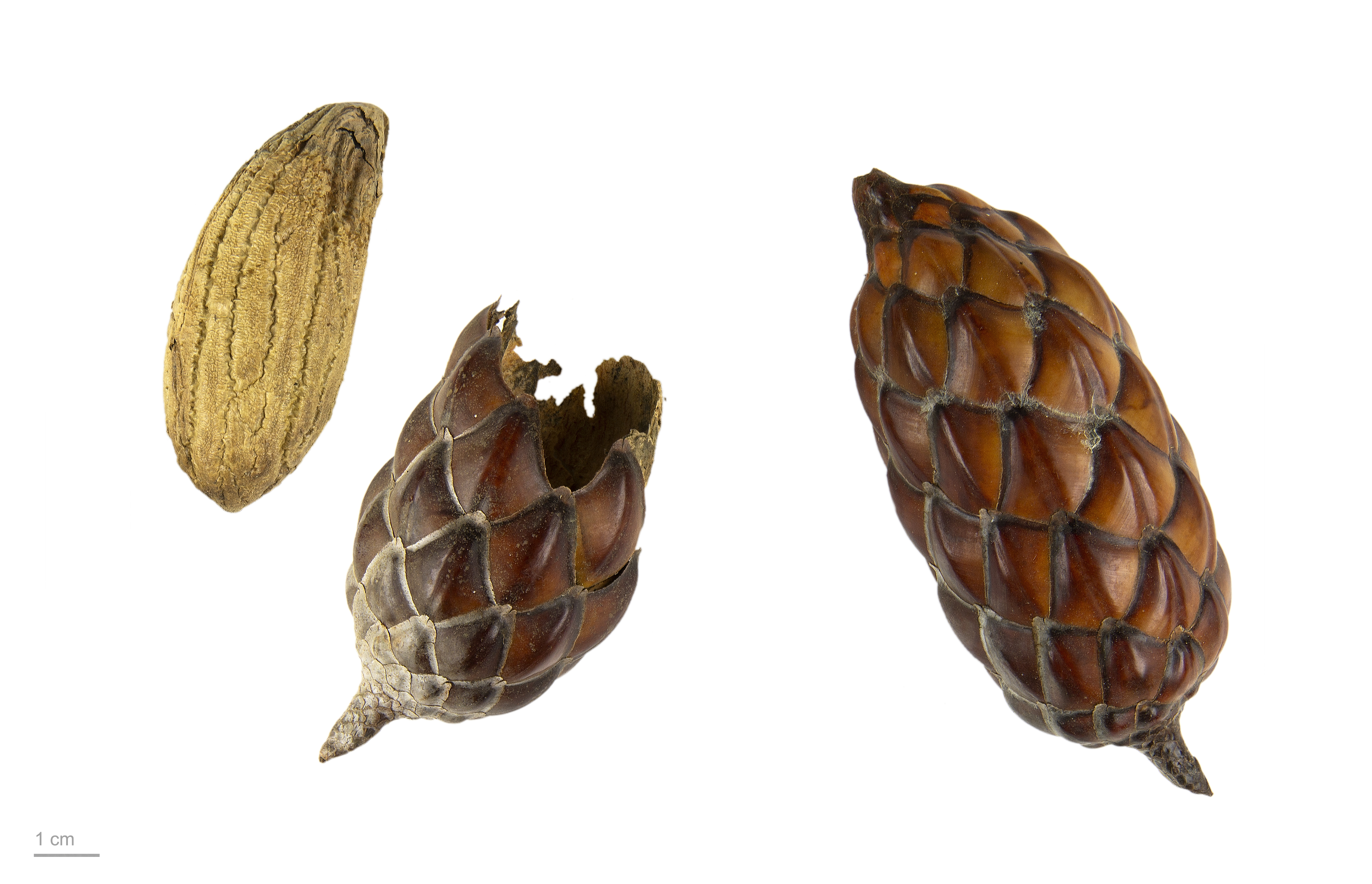
Raphia hookeri MHNT

Raphia hookeri is a palm species in the family Arecaceae or Palmae. It is found in Western and Central Africa, where it is locally used to make palm wine. It is best noted for its very long leaflets which in the subspecies R. h. gigantea, of Ghana and Ivory Coast, can be 11 ft 6 in (3.5 meters) in length, while only two inches (five centimeters) wide. These are the longest leaflets known from any plant.

== Description ==
This tall, solitary, or occasionally clustered palm can exceed 15 meters in height, with arching fronds extending 10–15 meters. Each leaf features 160–200 leaflets along the rachis, dark green and glossy above with a waxy or glaucous underside. The trunk, typically 10 meters tall and 30 centimeters in diameter, is often solitary but may produce 1–4 offshoots, with its upper portion covered in dark fibrous remnants of leaf bases.

Leaves emerge spirally, with sheaths reaching 3–4 meters in length and splitting opposite the petiole. The unarmed petiole extends another 3–4 meters, leading to leaflets 1–1.5 meters long and 4–5 centimeters wide, with tapering tips bearing small spines. The inflorescence is axillary and drooping, growing up to 2.5 meters or longer, with tightly packed branches bearing rows of rigid, curved floral structures.

The palm is monoecious, producing separate male and female flowers within the same inflorescence. Male flowers cluster towards the branch tips, measuring 1.5–2.5 centimeters long, with numerous stamens and curved corolla segments. Female flowers, found at the base, are larger and contain a three-celled ovary with a recurved stigma. The fruit is a one-seeded berry, ranging from inversely conical to elliptical, measuring 6–12 centimeters in length and 4–5 centimeters in width. Its surface is covered in vertical rows of overlapping, reddish-brown or pale yellowish-brown scales with darker tips.

Seeds are oblong, approximately 6–7.5 centimeters long and 3–3.5 centimeters wide, featuring irregular grooves and narrowly ruminate endosperm. Germination is hypogeal, with a taproot and adventitious roots. The seedling’s early leaves are highly reduced and irregularly lobed, followed by larger fronds reaching up to a meter in length, bearing about a dozen leaflets on either side of the rachis.
