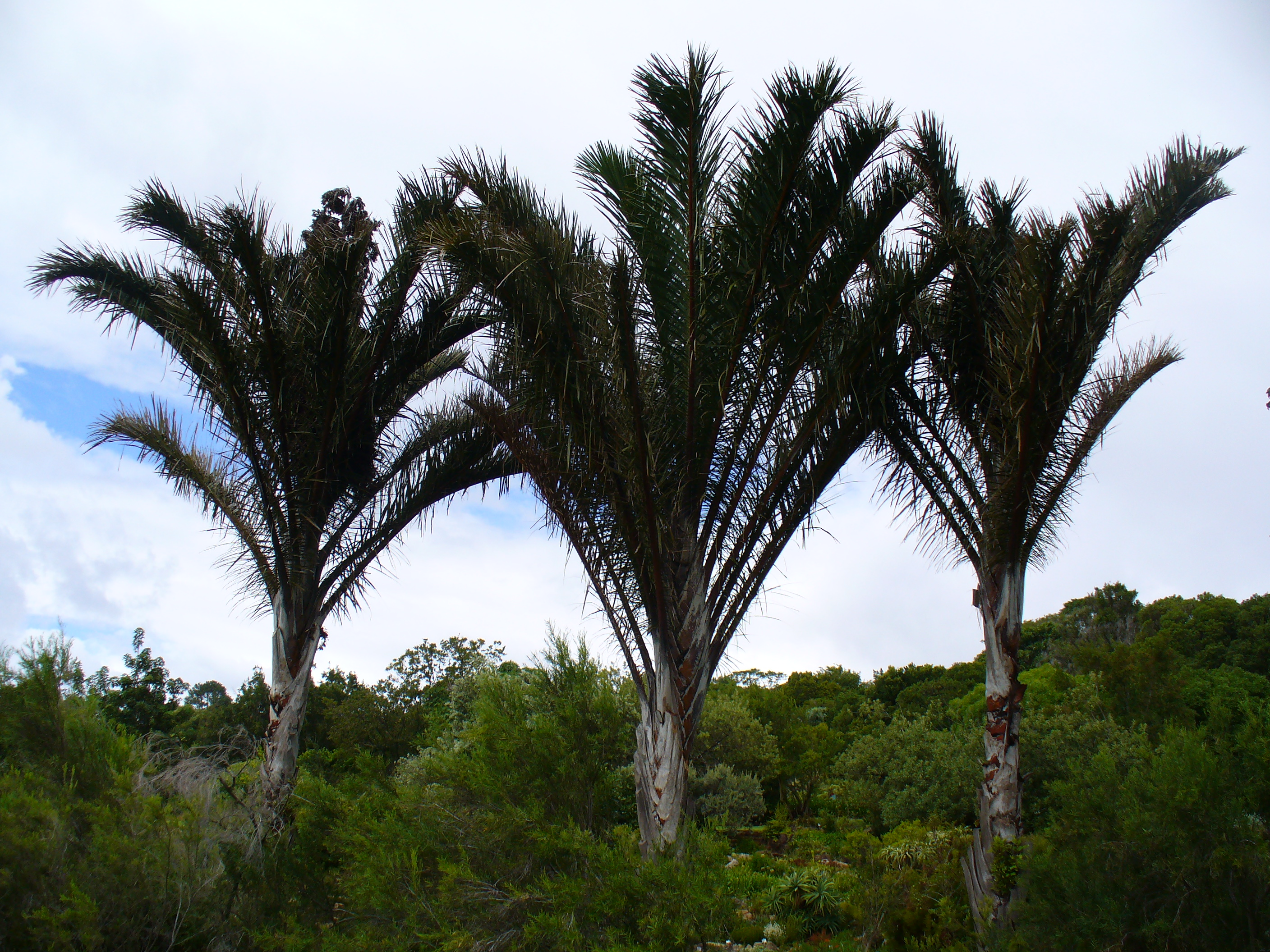

Scientific classification
- Kingdom: Plantae
- Clade: Tracheophytes
- Clade: Angiosperms
- Clade: Monocots
- Clade: Commelinids
- Order: Arecales
- Family: Arecaceae
- Subfamily: Calamoideae
- Tribe: Lepidocaryeae
- Genus: Raphia; P.Beauv.

= Raffia palm =

Genus of flowering plants in the palm family

Raffia palms are members of the genus Raphia. The Malagasy name rafia is derived from fia "to squeeze juice". The genus contains about twenty species of palms native to tropical regions of Africa, and especially Madagascar, with one species (R. taedigera) also occurring in Central and South America. R. taedigera is the source of raffia fibers, which are the veins of the leaves, and this species produces a fruit called "brazilia pods", "uxi nuts" or "uxi pods".

They grow up to 16 metres (52 ft) tall and are remarkable for their compound pinnate leaves, the longest in the plant kingdom; leaves of R. regalis up to 25 metres (82 ft) long and 3 metres (9.8 ft) wide are known. The plants are monocarpic, meaning that they flower once and then die after the seeds are mature. Some species have individual stems which die after fruiting, but have a root system which remains alive and sends up new stems which fruit. The Raphia palms are remarkable in being one of just two genera of flowering plants having the very rare phyllotaxy of 1/4 (the other is Laccosperma). Perhaps even more remarkable is the "King Raphia" (R. vinifera var. nigerica) which is the only known palm with pairs of opposite fronds.

== Cultivation and uses ==
=== Fiber ===
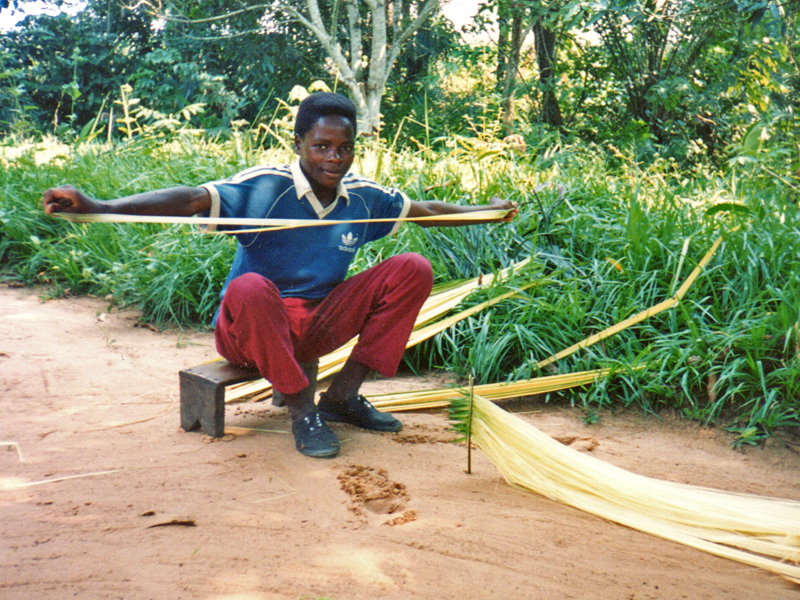
Removing the membrane

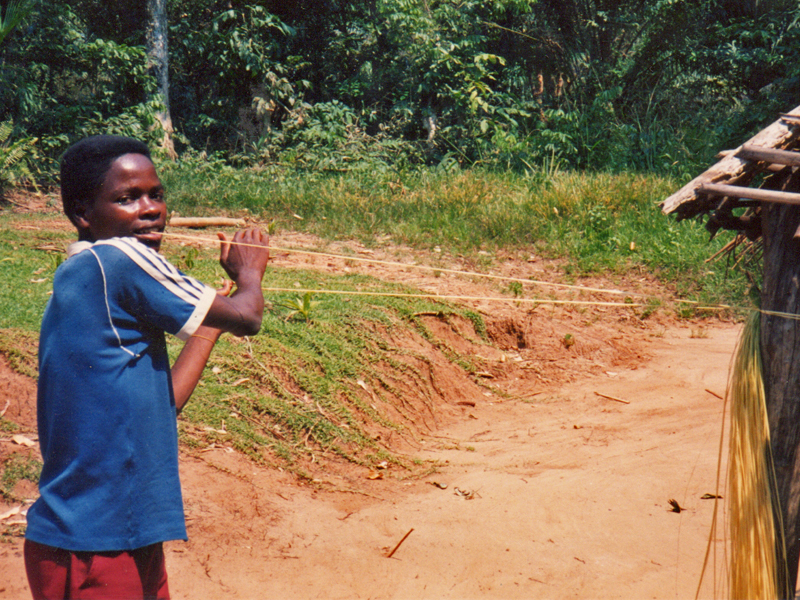
Rolling the fibres together before drying

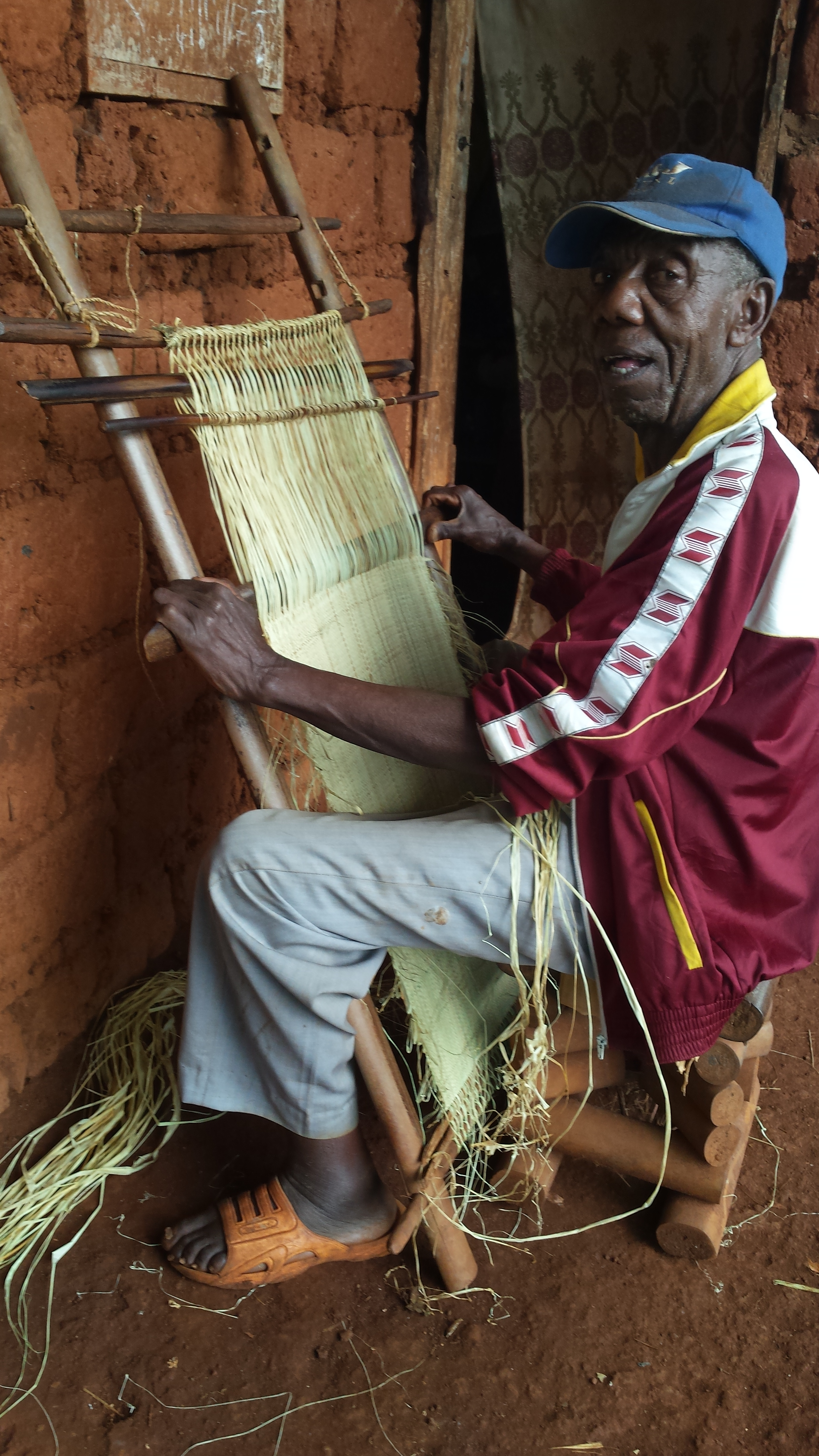
Weaving raffia

Raffia fiber is produced from the epidermal membrane on the underside of the leaf fronds. The membrane is taken off to create a long thin fiber, which can be rolled together for added strength before they are finally dried. Fibres can be made into twine, rope, garden ties, and used in tree grafting. Fibres are important in the area of textiles, as they can be dyed and woven into products such as decorative mats, baskets, placemats, hats, and shoes.

=== Raffia wine ===
The sap of the palm can be fermented into raffia wine. It is traditionally collected by cutting a box in the top of the palm and suspending a large gourd below to collect the milky white liquid. Unlike with oil palms, this process kills the tree. Sap from both the raffia and oil palms can be allowed to ferment over a few days. When first collected from the tree, it is sweet and appears slightly carbonated. As it ages more sugar is converted. Raffia wine tends to be sweeter at any age when compared to oil palm wine. Both kinds of palm wine can also be distilled into strong liquors, such as Ogogoro. Traditionally in some cultures where raffia or oil palm are locally available, guests and spirits are offered these drinks from the palm trees.

=== Other uses ===
In local construction, raffia fibres are used for ropes, with branches and leaves providing sticks and supporting beams, and various roof coverings. The people of Ogba kingdom in Rivers State and other southern Nigerians use raffia palm fronds as fishing poles. The frond is usually cut from a young palm tree. The leaves are removed and the stake is dried, which becomes very light, and the hook is attached to a line, which is tied to the stake, making it a fishing pole.

The raffia palm is important in societies such as that of the Province of Bohol in the Philippines, Kuba of Democratic Republic of the Congo, Nso of Cameroon, the Igbo and Ibibio/Annang/Bahumono of Southeastern Nigeria, the Tiv of Northcentral Nigeria and Southwestern Cameroons, the Urhobo and Ijaw people of the Niger delta Nigeria, Yoruba people of southwestern Nigeria, among several other West African ethnic nations and the Kongo people.

=== Synthetic raffia ===
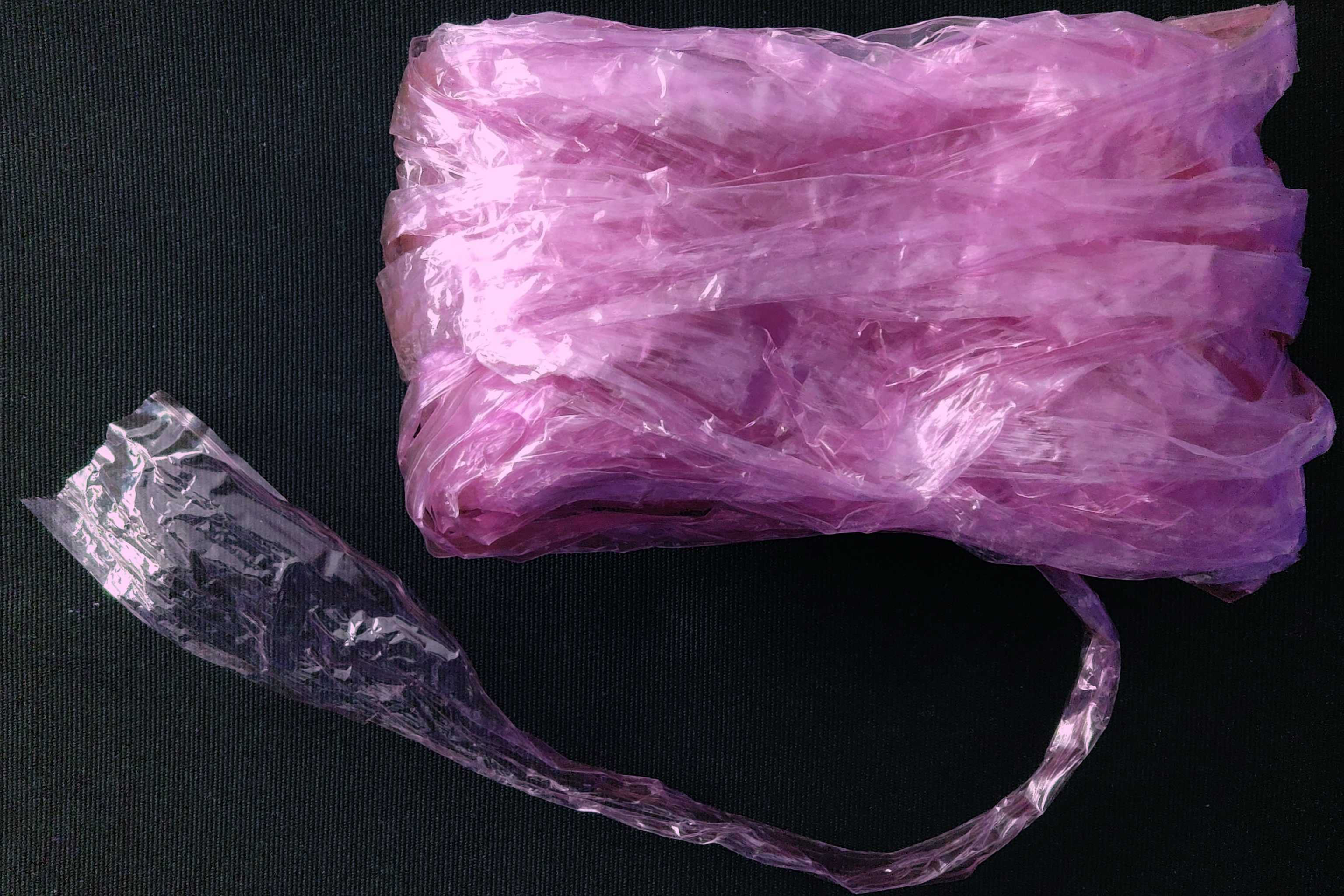
Synthetic raffia string longitudinally unfurled into a ribbon

A strand of raffia has a maximum length of about 1.5 m (4.9 ft) and an irregular width. When found on spools or hanks of greater lengths, it is likely synthetic raffia, produced from polypropylene. First produced by Covema in collaboration with Sulzer, a manufacturer of flat weaving looms for natural fibers, who adapted their looms to process synthetic raffia. These fabrics are used to make carpet backing, protective sheets, and bags for rice, potatoes, and citrus fruit. Covema also developed a method to cover raffia fabric with a thin film of polyethylene in order to make it waterproof.

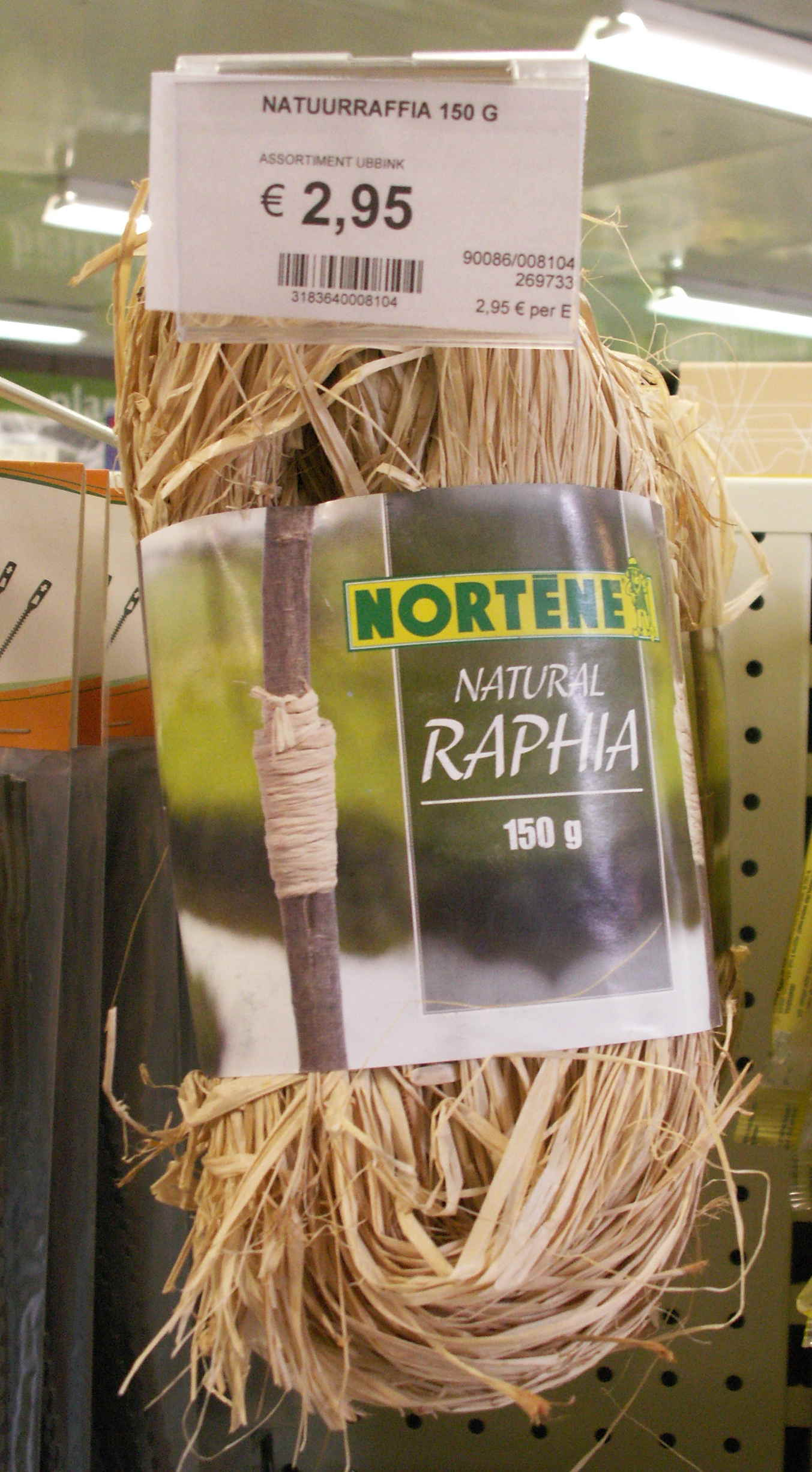
Raffia can be used in tree grafting.

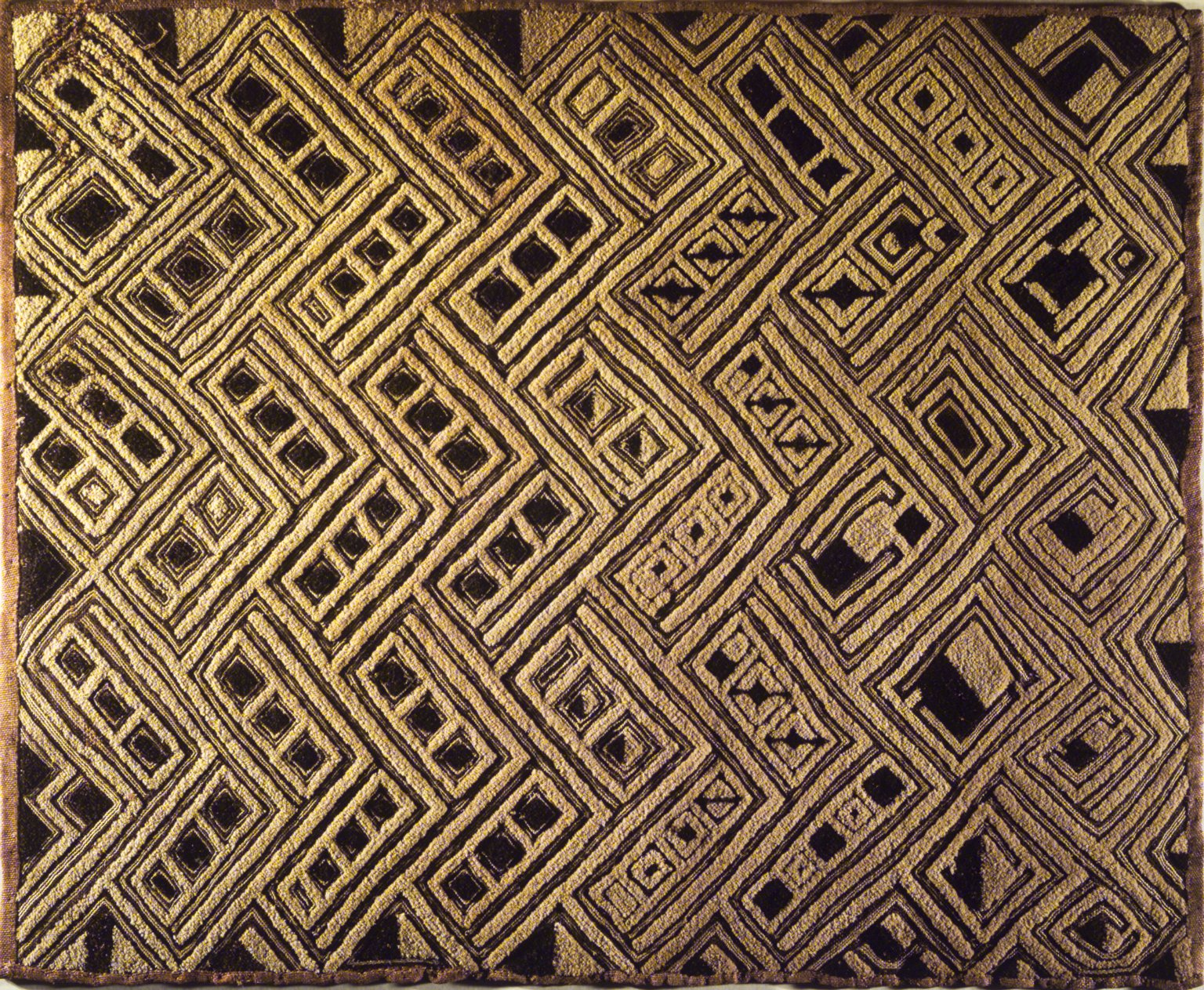
Kuba raffia cloth panel

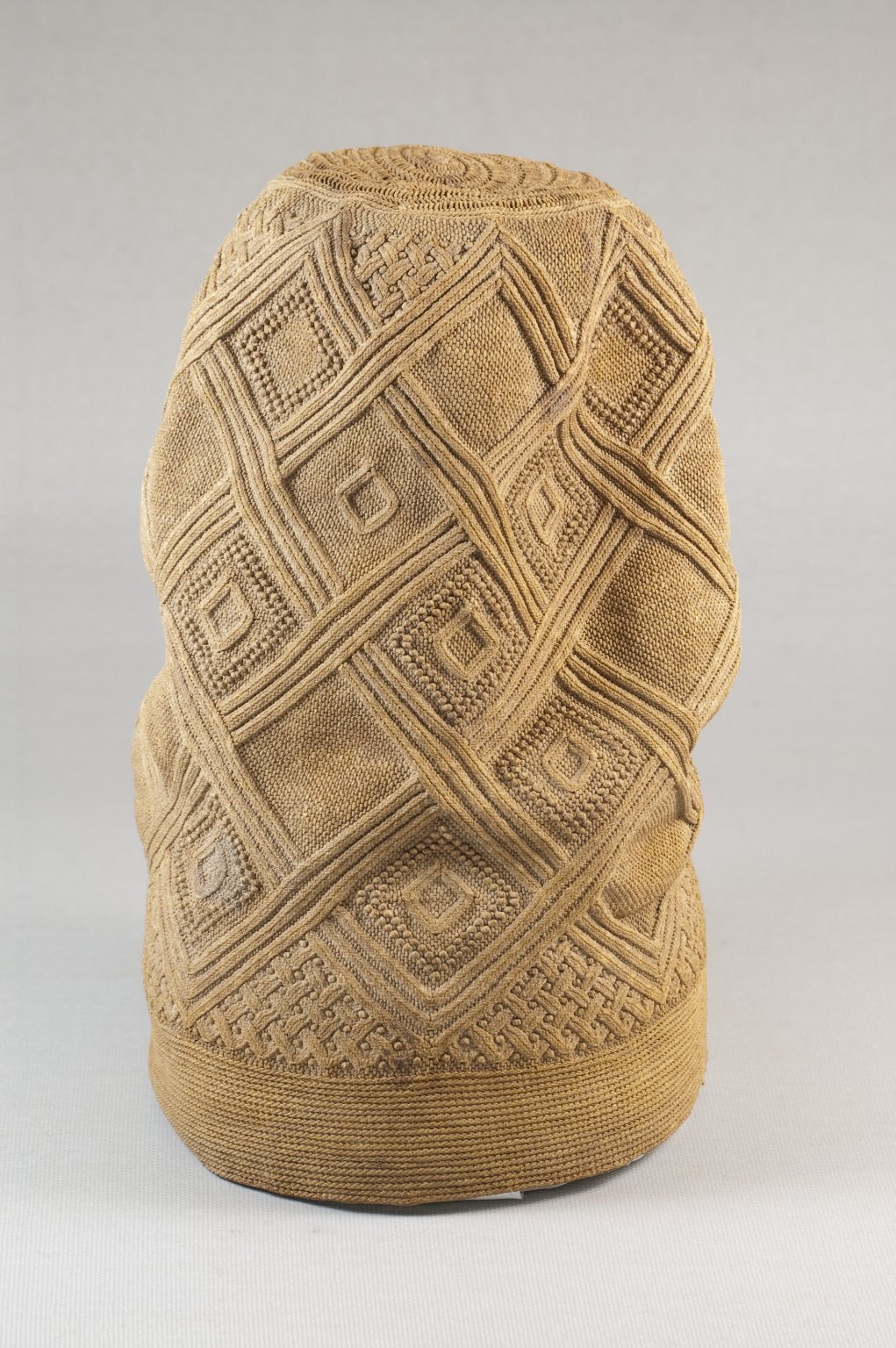
Kongo raffia cloth mpu (hat)

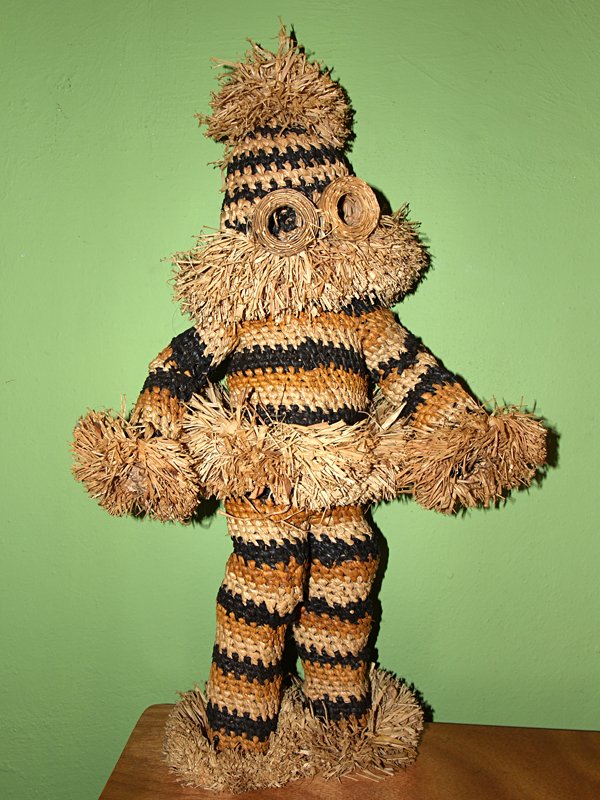
Raffia is woven to make the traditional Munganji dancer suit used in Bapende ceremonies in the Gungu region of Bandundu Province, Democratic Republic of the Congo.

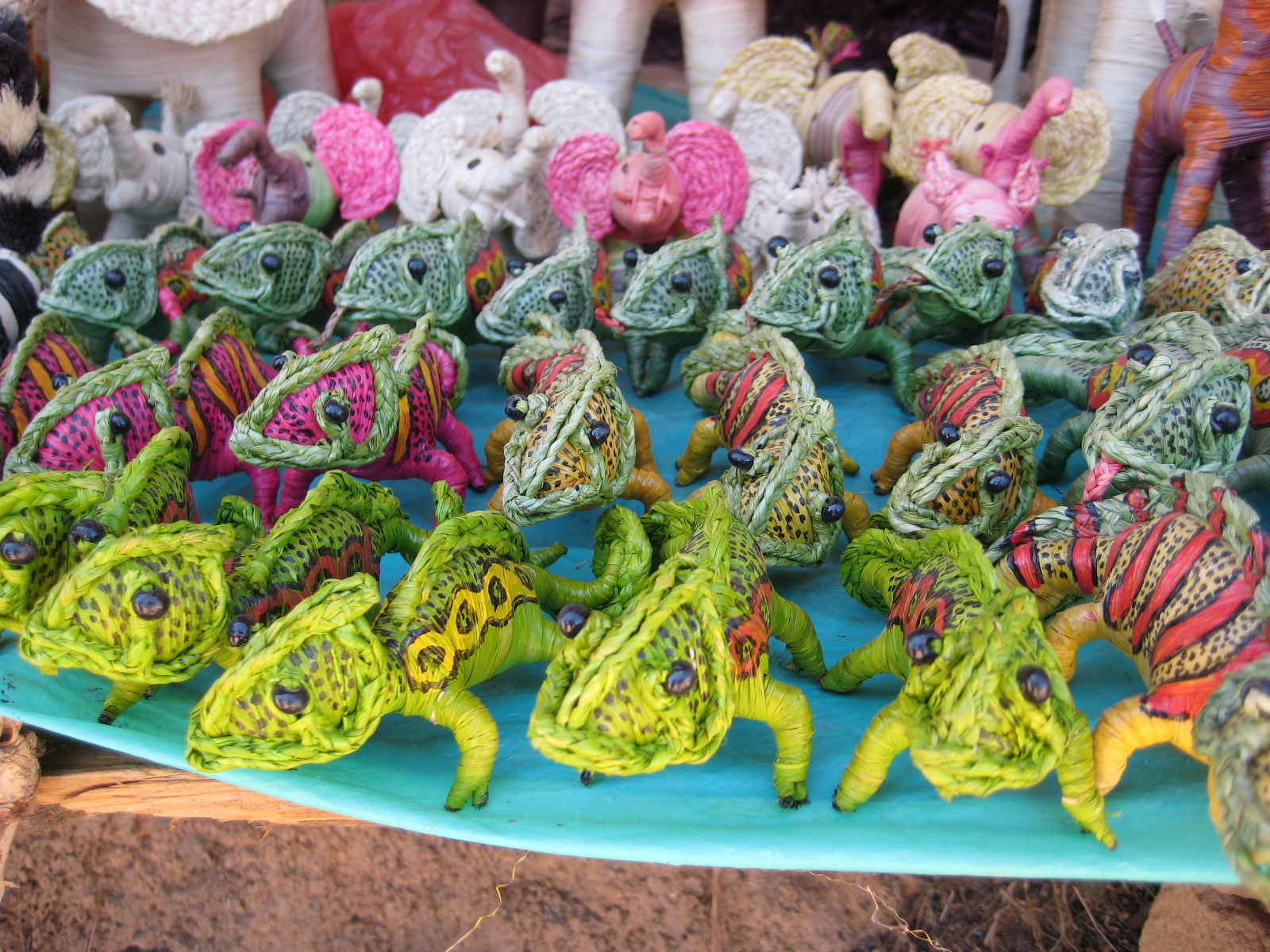
Raphia animals in Madagascar

== Species ==
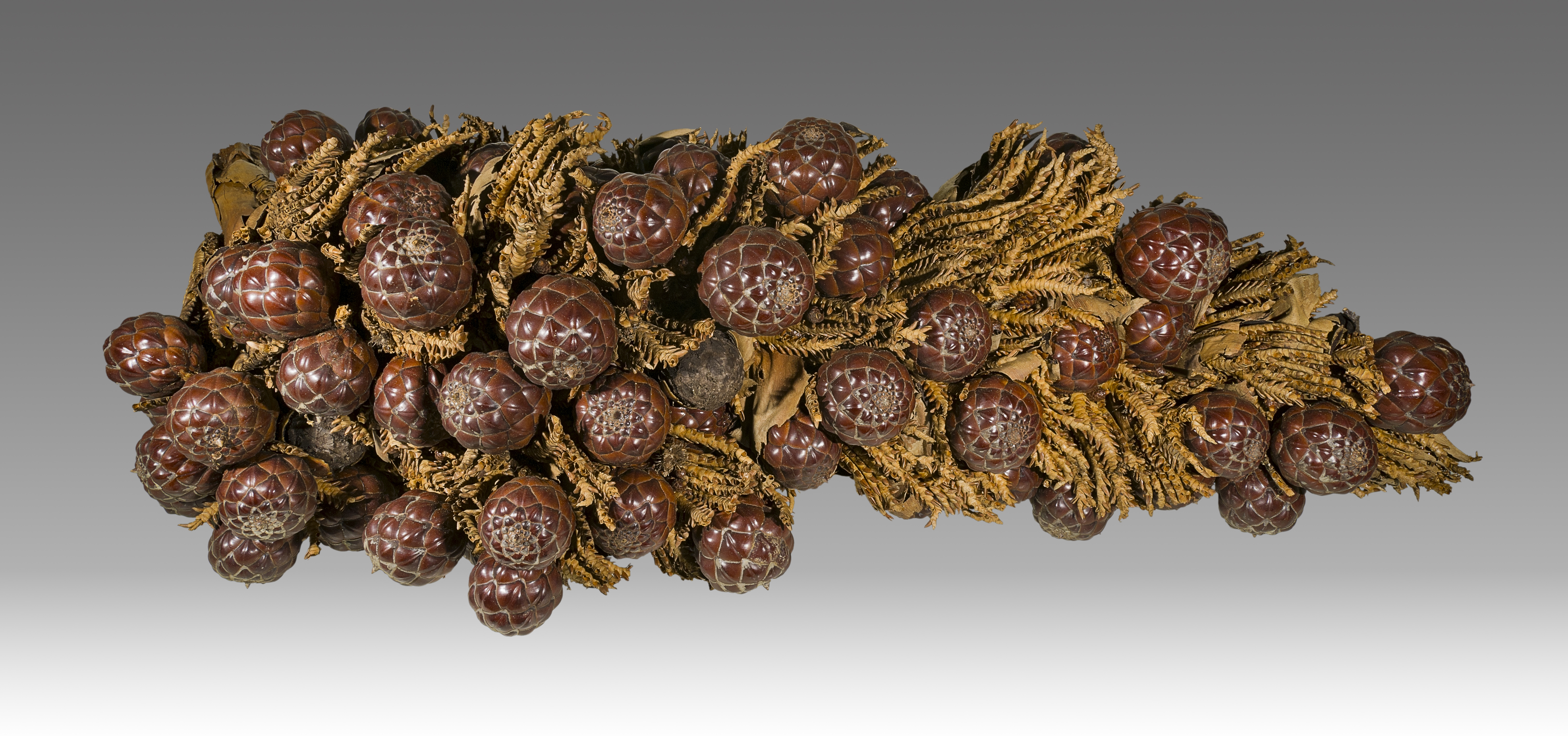
Raffia palm fruit

| Image | Scientific name | Distribution |
|---|---|---|
| | Raphia africana Otedoh | Nigeria, Cameroon |
| | Raphia australis Oberm. & Strey | Mozambique, South Africa |
| | Raphia farinifera (Gaertn.) Hyl. | Africa from Senegal to Tanzania, south to Mozambique and Zimbabwe |
| | Raphia gentiliana De Wild. | Democratic Republic of Congo, Central African Republic |
| | Raphia hookeri G.Mann & H.Wendl. | western and central Africa from Liberia to Angola |
| | Raphia laurentii De Wild. | Angola, Democratic Republic of Congo, Central African Republic |
| | Raphia longiflora G.Mann & H.Wendl. | from Nigeria to Democratic Republic of Congo |
| | Raphia mambillensis Otedoh | Nigeria, Cameroon, Central African Republic, Sudan |
| | Raphia mannii Becc. | Nigeria, Bioko |
| | Raphia matombe De Wild. | Cabinda, Democratic Republic of Congo |
| | Raphia monbuttorum Drude | Nigeria, Cameroon, Chad, Central African Republic, South Sudan |
| | Raphia palma-pinus (Gaertn.) Hutch. | western Africa from Liberia to Cabinda |
| | Raphia regalis Becc. | central Africa from Nigeria to Angola |
| | Raphia rostrata Burret | Cabinda, Democratic Republic of Congo |
| | Raphia ruwenzorica Otedoh | eastern Democratic Republic of Congo, Rwanda, Burundi |
| | Raphia sese De Wild. | Democratic Republic of Congo |
| | Raphia sudanica A. Chev. | western Africa from Senegal to Cameroon |
| | Raphia taedigera (Mart.) Mart. | Nigeria, Cameroon, Central America (Costa Rica, Nicaragua, Panama), South America (Colombia, Pará State of Brazil) |
| | Raphia textilis Welw. | Cabinda, Democratic Republic of Congo, Gabon, Angola |
| | Raphia vinifera P. Beauv. | western Africa from Democratic Republic of Congo to Benin |
