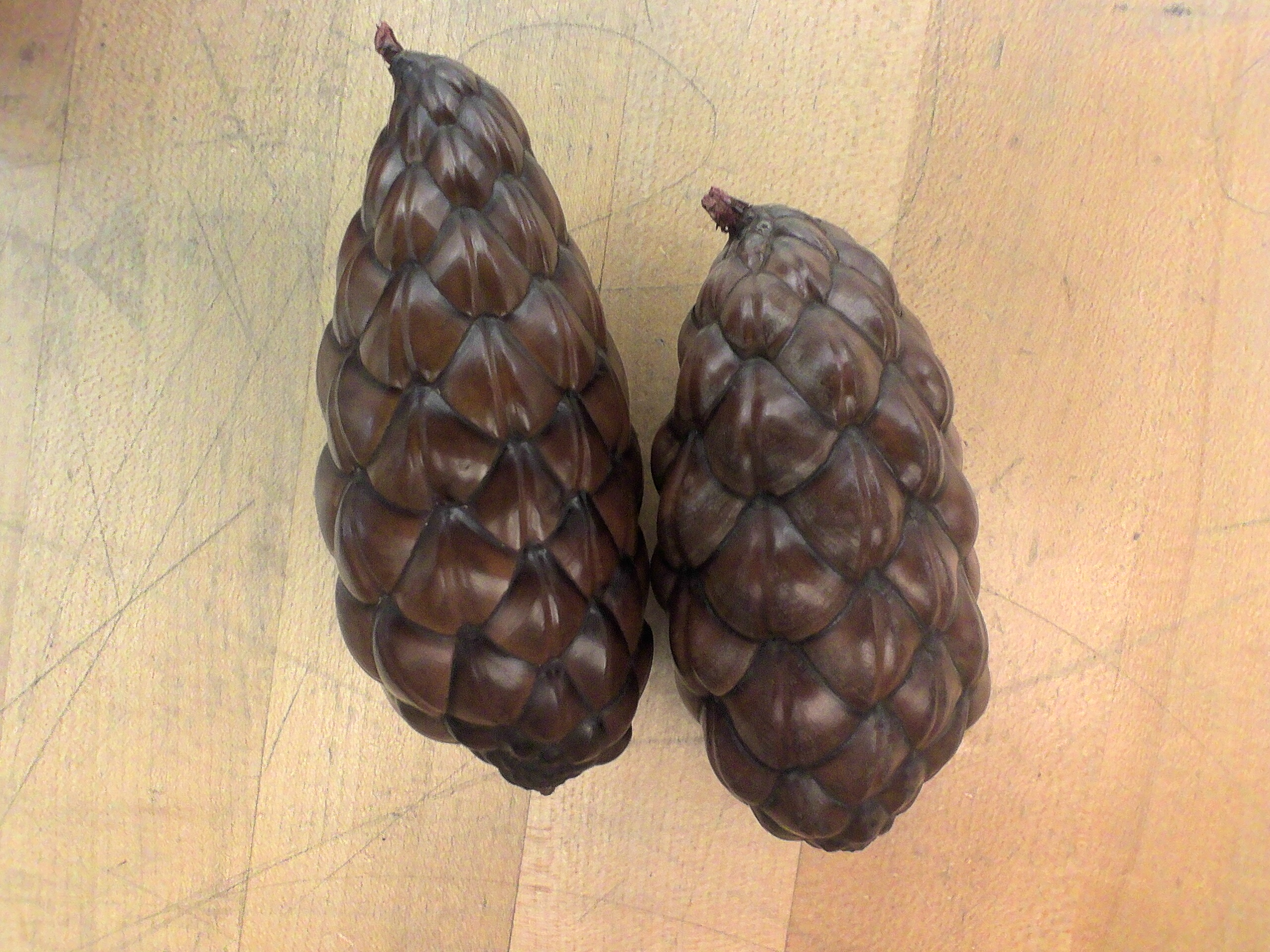

Conservation status
- Least Concern (IUCN 3.1)

Scientific classification
- Kingdom: Plantae
- Clade: Embryophytes
- Clade: Tracheophytes
- Clade: Angiosperms
- Clade: Monocots
- Clade: Commelinids
- Order: Arecales
- Family: Arecaceae
- Genus: Raphia
- Species: R. vinifera

Binomial name
- Raphia vinifera P.Beauv.

Synonyms
- Metroxylon viniferum (P.Beauv.) Spreng.; Raphia diasticha Burret; Raphia vinifera var. nigerica Otedoh; Sagus raphia Poir.; Sagus vinifera (P.Beauv.) Pers.; Sagus vinifera (P. Beauv.) Poir.

= Raphia vinifera =

West African piassava palm

Species of grass

Raphia vinifera, the West African piassava palm, bamboo palm or West African bass fibre is a palm tree species in the genus Raphia. It is native to Benin, Gambia, Ghana, Nigeria, Togo, Central African Republic, Cameroon, and Democratic Republic of the Congo ( = Zaire = Congo-Kinshasa). It is particularly abundant along the creeks of Niger Delta, Cross River, Lagos and Ikorodu in Nigeria.

The nut contains bitter oil, which has the property of stupefying fish. The variety or subspecies found in the Niger River delta is called the "King Raphia" (Raphia vinifera var. nigerica) is extraordinary in being the only known type of palm with opposite pairs of leaves. This variety also differs in having reddish petioles.
