= List of writers by name: L =

The following is a List of writers by name whose last names begin with L:

Abbreviations: ch = children's; d = drama, screenwriting; f = fiction; nf = non-fiction; p = poetry, song lyrics

== La ==
- Jacques de la Faye (17th-century, France, nf)
- Ilmar Laaban (1921–2000, Estonia, p/nf)
- Abdellatif Laabi (born 1942, Morocco, p)
- Louise Labé (c. 1524–1566, France, p)
- Nicolae Labiș (1935–1956, Romania, p)
- Pierre Labrie (born 1972, Canada, p)
- Jacques Lacarrière (1925–2005, France, nf)
- María Hortensia Lacau (1910–2006, Argentina, nf/p)
- Kate Lace (born 1956, England, f), pseudonym of Catherine Jones
- Robert Lacey (born 1944, England, nf)
- Djanet Lachmet (born 1948, Algeria, f)
- Camilla Läckberg (born 1974, Sweden, f)
- Mercedes Lackey (born 1950, US, f)
- Pierre Choderlos de Laclos (1741–1803, France/Italy, f/p/d)
- Mary Lacy (c. 1740–1801, England, nf)
- Amir H. Ladan (born 1943, Iran/US, nf)
- Tomislav Ladan (1932–2008, Yugoslavia/Croatia, nf/f)
- László Ladányi (1907–1992, Hungary, f/nf)
- Fred Ladd (1927–2021, US, d)
- Mike Ladd (born 1959, Australia, p)
- Duro Ladipo (1926–1978, Nigeria, d)
- Harold Sonny Ladoo (1945–1973, Trinidad/Canada, f)
- Monique Laederach (1938–2004, Switzerland, p/f)
- Laerte (born 1951, Brazil, nf), pseudonym of Laerte Coutinho
- Ann-Helén Laestadius (born 1971, Sweden, nf/ch)
- R. A. Lafferty (1914–2002, US, f/nf)
- Jules Laforgue (1860–1887, Uruguay/France, p)
- Enrique Lafourcade (1927–2019, Chile, f/nf)
- Olof Lagercrantz (1911–2002, Sweden, p/f/nf)
- Pär Lagerkvist (1891–1974, Sweden, p/d/f)
- Selma Lagerlöf (1858–1940, Sweden, f/ch)
- Nina Lagergren (1921–2019, Sweden, nf)
- Marcelle Lagesse (1916–2011, Mauritius, f/d/nf)
- Enrique Laguerre (1906–2005, Puerto Rico, f/nf/d)
- Tim LaHaye (1926–2016, US, f/nf)
- Mohammed Aziz Lahbabi (1922–1993, Morocco, f/nf/p)
- Amina Lahbabi-Peters (living, Morocco, nf)
- Abdelrahim Lahbibi (born 1950, Morocco, f)
- Jhumpa Lahiri (born 1967, England/Italy, f/nf)
- Leila Lahlou (living, Morocco, nf)
- Ross Laidlaw (living, Scotland, f)
- Jarkko Laine (1947–2006, Finland, p/f/d)
- Sinikka Laine (born 1945, Finland, f/ch)
- Manuel Mujica Láinez (1910–1984, Argentina, f/nf)
- Kojo Laing (1946–2017, Ghana, f/p)
- Olivia Laing (born 1977, England, nf/f)
- Sarah Laing (born 1973, N Zealand, f/ch)
- Feri Lainšček (born 1959, Yugoslavia/Slovenia, f/d)
- Elizabeth Laird (born 1943, N Zealand/England, ch)
- Jack Lait (1883–1954, US, nf/d)
- David Lake (1929–2016, India/Australia, f/p/nf)
- Lori L. Lake (born 1960, US, f)
- Simon Lake (1942–2006, US, f), pseudonym of Charles L. Grant
- Dragan Lakićević (born 1954, Yugoslavia/Serbia, p/f)
- Guy Francis Laking (1875–1919, England, nf)
- Laila Lalami (born 1968, Morocco/US, f)
- Ivan V. Lalić (1931–1996, Yugoslavia, p)
- Mihailo Lalić (1914–1992, Montenegro/Yugoslavia, f)
- Theo Lalleman (1946–2013, Netherlands, nf)
- Lalon (1774–1890, India, nf/p), also Lalon Shah
- Gadul Singh Lama (born 1939, India, f/p)
- Philip Lamantia (1927–2005, US, p/nf)
- Kendrick Lamar (born 1987, US, p)
- Shoney Lamar (born 1982, US, p)
- Peter Lamarque (born 1948, England, nf)
- Alphonse de Lamartine (1790–1869, France, nf)
- Arnette Lamb (1947–1988, US, f)
- Charles and Mary Lamb (1775–1834 and 1764–1847, England, nf/p/ch)
- Charlotte Lamb (1937–2000, England/Isle of Man, f)
- Christina Lamb (born 1965, England, nf)
- Dorothy Lamb (1887–1967, England, nf)
- Harold Lamb (1892–1962, US, nf/d/f)
- Sir James Lamb, 1st Baronet (1752–1824, England, p/nf), born James Burges
- Charles Lambert (born 1953, England, f)
- Joyce Lambert (1916–2005, England, nf)
- David Lambkin (born 1947, England/S Africa, f)
- Leónidas Lamborghini (1927–2009, Argentina, p)
- Osvaldo Lamborghini (1940–1985, Argentina, p/f/d)
- Koulsy Lamko (born 1959, Chad/Mexico, d/p/f)
- George Lamming (1927–2022, Barbados, f/nf/p)
- Hubert Lampo (1920–2006, Belgium, f/nf)
- Wafaa Lamrani (born 1960, Morocco, p)
- Beatrice Lamwaka (living, Uganda, f/p)
- Jorge Lanata (born 1960, Argentina, nf/f)
- John Lanchester (born 1962, Hong Kong/England, f/nf)
- Gustav Landauer (1870–1919, Germany, nf)
- Heinrich Landesmann (1821–1902, Austrian E, p/nf), pseudonym Hieronymus Lorm
- Geoffrey Landis (born 1955, US, nf/f)
- Jill Marie Landis (born 1948, US, f)
- Felicity Landon (living, England, nf)
- Letitia Elizabeth Landon (1802–1838, England/Gold Coast, p/f), pseudonym L.E.L.
- Walter Savage Landor (1775–1864, f/nf/p)
- Anne Landsman (born 1959, S Africa, f/nf)
- Derek Landy (born 1974, Ireland, f)
- Jane Lane (1905–1978, England, nf), pseudonym of Elaine Kidner Dakers
- Andrew Lang (1844–1912, Scotland, f/nf/ch)
- Karl Heinrich Lang (1764–1835, Germany, nf)
- Fátima Langa (1953–2017, Mozambique, ch)
- Mandla Langa (born 1950, S Africa, p/f)
- Ruth Ryan Langan (born 1937, US, f)
- Annabel Langbein (born 1958, N Zealand, nf)
- Antoni Lange (1863–1929, Poland, f/nf)
- Dagmar Lange (1914–1991, Sweden, f), pseudonym Maria Lang
- Ernst Philipp Karl Lange (1913–1999, Germany, f), pseudonym Philipp Galen
- Henrik Langeland (born 1972, Norway, f)
- Katja Lange-Müller (born 1951, Germany, f/d)
- Cornelis Jacobus Langenhoven (1873–1932, S Africa, p)
- Sissel Lange-Nielsen (1931–2023, Norway, nf)
- Gertrude Langer (1908–1984, Austria/Australia, nf)
- David Langford (born 1953, Wales/England, f)
- Elisabeth Langgässer (1899–1950, Germany, p/f)
- William Langland (c. 1332 – c. 1386, England, p)
- Eve Langley (1904–1974, Australia, f/p)
- Noel Langley (1911–1980, S Africa/US, d)
- Tania Langley (1927–2010, England, f), pseudonym of Tilly Armstrong
- Katherine Langrish (living, England, ch)
- Jane Langton (1922–2018, US, ch/f)
- Mary Lewis Langworthy (1872–1949, US, d)
- Emilia Lanier (1569–1645, England, p), also spelled Aemilia Lanyer
- Coral Lansbury (1929–1991, Australia, f/nf)
- Alfred Lansing (1921–1975, US, nf)
- Jennifer Lanthier (born 1964, Canada, ch/nf)
- Sebestyén Tinódi Lantos (c. 1510–1556, Hungary, p/nf)
- Laureano Vallenilla Lanz (1870–1936, Venezuela, nf)
- Lao She (老舍, 1899–1966, China, f/d)
- Laozi (老子, 604 BCE-600 BCE, China, nf), commonly Lao Tzu
- Sasha LaPointe (living, US, f/p)
- Alda Lara (1930–1962, Angola, p)
- Joaquín Gallegos Lara (1909–1947, Ecuador, f/p/nf)
- Rebecca Hammond Lard (1772–1855, US, p)
- Waciny Laredj (born 1954, Algeria, f/nf)
- Justine Larbalestier (born 1967, Australia, f/ch)
- Valery Larbaud (1881–1957, France, f/p)
- Dionysius Lardner (1793–1859, Ireland/France, nf)
- Waciny Laredj (born 1954, Algeria, f)
- Árni Lárentíusson (1304 – post-1337, Iceland, nf)
- Josaphat-Robert Large (1942–2017, Haiti/US, p/f/nf)
- Christopher Largen (1969–2012, US, f/nf)
- Dalenda Larguèche (born 1953, Tunisia, nf)
- Glenda Larke (living, Australia, f/nf)
- Bruce Larkin (born 1957, US, ch/p)
- Philip Larkin (1922–1985, England, p/f)
- Viveca Lärn (born 1944, Sweden, ch/f)
- Jeremy Larner (1937–2026, US, p/f/nf)
- Abdallah Laroui (born 1933, Morocco, nf/f)
- Fouad Laroui (born 1958, Morocco/Netherlands, f/nf/p)
- Michael de Larrabeiti (1934–2008, England, f)
- Claudia Lars (1899–1974, El Salvador, p)
- Alf Larsen (1885–1967, Norway, p/nf)
- Britt Karin Larsen (born 1945, Norway, p/f)
- Gunnar Larsen (1900–1958, Norway, f)
- Terje Holtet Larsen (born 1963, Norway, f/nf)
- Kirby Larson (born 1954, US, ch)
- Trude Brænne Larssen (born 1967, Norway, f)
- Guðrún Lárusdóttir (1880–1938, Iceland, nf/f)
- Fray Íñigo Abbad y Lasierra (1745–1814, Spain/Puerto Rico, nf)
- Else Lasker-Schüler (1869–1945, Germany/Palestine, p/nf/d)
- Michael Laskey (born 1944, England, f)
- Marghanita Laski (1915–1988, England, f/nf/d)
- Rina Lasnier (1915–1997, Canada, p/d)
- Erik Larson (born 1954, US, nf)
- Glen A. Larson (1937–2014, US, d)
- Ron Larson (born 1941, US, nf)
- Stieg Larsson (1954–2004, Sweden, f/nf)
- Stig Larsson (born 1955, Sweden, f/p/d)
- Emmanuel, comte de Las Cases (1766–1842, France, nf)
- James Lasdun (born 1958, England, f/nf/p)
- Jack Lasenby (1931–2019, N Zealand, ch)
- Jennifer Lash (1938–1993, England, f/nf)
- Nicholas Lash (1934–2020, England, nf)
- Micah Lasher (born 1981), US
- Kathryn Lasky (born 1944, US, ch/f)
- David Lassman (born 1963, England, nf)
- Ignacio Lasso (1911–1943, Ecuador, p)
- Kurd Lasswitz (1848–1910, Germany, f/nf)
- Lasus of Hermione (6th c. BCE, Greece, p)
- Miklós László (1903–1973, Hungary/US, d), born Nicholaus Leitner
- Francis Lathom (1774–1832, England, f/d)
- Dorothy P. Lathrop (1891–1980, US, ch)
- George Parsons Lathrop (1851–1898, US, p/f/nf)
- Yulia Latynina (born 1966, Soviet Union/Russia, f/nf)
- Evelyn Lau (劉綺芬, born 1971, Canada, p/f)
- Heinrich Laube (1806–1884, Germany/Austria, d/f)
- William Laud (1573–1645, England, nf)
- Josef Lauff (1855–1933, Germany, p/d)
- James Laughlin (1914–1997, US, p)
- Keith Laumer (1925–1993, US, f)
- March Laumer (1923–2000, US, f)
- Juan Tomás Ávila Laurel (born 1966, Equatorial Guinea, f/p/nf)
- Margaret Laurence (1926–1987, Canada, f)
- Teresa de Lauretis (1938–2026, Italy, nf)
- Ann Lauterbach (born 1942, US, p/nf)
- Tato Laviera (1950–2013, Puerto Rico/US, p/d)
- Caroline Lawrence (born 1954, England/US, ch)
- D. H. Lawrence (1885–1930, England, f/nf/p)
- George Alfred Lawrence (1827–1876, England, f)
- Janet Laurence (born 1937, England, nf/f), pseudonym Julia Lisle
- Stephanie Laurens (born 1953, Australia, f)
- Hugh Laurie (born 1959, England, d/f)
- Comte de Lautréamont (1846–1870, Uruguay/France, p)
- Dorianne Laux (born 1952, US, p)
- Christine Lavant (1915–1973, Austria, p/f)
- Johann Kaspar Lavater (1741–1801, Switzerland, p/nf)
- Nel Law (1914–1990, Australia, p/nf)
- Stephen R. Lawhead (born 1950, US/England, f/ch)
- Pat Lawlor (1893–1979, N Zealand, nf)
- Jeremy Lawrance (born 1952, Uganda/England, nf)
- Anthony Lawrence (born 1957, Australia, p/f)
- Aubrey Lawrence (1875–1930, England, nf)
- D. H. Lawrence (1885–1930, England/France, f/nf/p)
- Frieda Lawrence (1879–1956, Germany/US, nf)
- George Alfred Lawrence (1827–1876, England/Scotland, f)
- Michael Lawrence (born 1943, England, ch)
- William Lawrence (1783–1867, England, nf)
- Henry Lawson (1867–1922, Australia, f/p/nf)
- Louisa Lawson (1848–1920, Australia, p/f/nf)
- Robert Lawson (1892–1957, US, ch)
- Sylvia Lawson (1932–2017, Australia, nf)
- Harry Lawton (1927–2005, US, f)
- Edward Michael Law-Yone (1911–1980, Burma/US, nf)
- Wendy Law-Yone (born 1947, Burma/US, f/nf)
- Auður Laxness (1918–2012, Iceland, nf)
- Halldór Laxness (1902–1998, Iceland, f/p/nf)
- Dagon Khin Khin Lay (1904–1981, Burma/Myanmar, f), birth name Khin Lay Latt
- Camara Laye (1928–1980, Guinea, f)
- Robert Lax (1915–2000, US, p)
- Halldór Laxness (1902–1998, Iceland, f/p/nf)
- Ervin Lázár (1936–2006, Hungary, ch/f)
- Jelena Lazarević (1365/1366–1443, Serbia, nf)
- Laza Lazarević (1851–1891, Serbia, nf/f)
- Stefan Lazarević (c. 1377–1427, Serbia, p)
- Simone Lazaroo (born 1961, Singapore/Australia, f)
- Greg Lazarus (living, joint pseudonym, S Africa, f/nf), Greg Fried and Lisa Lazarus
- Vladimir Lazović (born 1954, Yugoslavia/Serbia, f)
- Henryka Łazowertówna (1909–1942, Poland, p), Holocaust victim

== Le–Lh ==
- John le Carré (1931–2020, England, f), pseudonym of David John Moore Cornwell
- J. M. G. Le Clézio (born 1940, France, f/nf/ch)
- Gertrud von Le Fort (1876–1971, Germany, f/p/nf)
- Ursula K. Le Guin (1929–2018, US, f/p/nf)
- Eugène Le Roy (1836–2007, France, nf/f)
- Bronwyn Lea (born 1969, Australia, p/nf)
- Edmund Leach (1910–1989, England, nf)
- Penelope Leach (born 1937, England, nf)
- Stephen Leacock (1869–1944, Canada, nf)
- Etelka A. Leadlay (born 1947, England, nf)
- Munro Leaf (1905–1976, US, ch)
- Caroline Leakey (1827–1881, England, p/f)
- Edmund Leamy (1848–1904, Ireland, ch)
- Sarah Lean (living, England, ch)
- Edward Lear (1812–1888, England, p/f)
- Benjamin Lebert (born 1982, Germany, f)
- Lesley Lebkowicz (born 1946, Australia, p)
- Paulina Lebl-Albala (1891–1967, Serbia/US, nf)
- Marie Leblanc (1867–1915, Mauritius, nf/f)
- Maurice Leblanc (1864–1941, France, f)
- Pierre-Antoine Lebrun (1785–1873, France, p)
- Stanisław Jerzy Lec (1909–1966, Poland, p/nf)
- Joanna Lech (born 1984, Poland, p/f)
- Jan Lechoń (1899–1956, Russian E/US, p/nf)
- Day Leclaire (living, US, f)
- Félix Leclerc (1914–1988, Canada, p/f/d)
- Daphne Ledward (born 1945, England, nf/f)
- Francis Ledwidge (1887–1917, Ireland, p)
- Michael Ledwidge (living, US, f)
- David Lee (born 1944, US, p)
- Dennis Lee (born 1939, Canada, p/nf/ch)
- Edward Edson Lee (1884–1944, US, ch), pseudonym Leo Edwards
- Harper Lee (1926–2016, US, f)
- Hermione Lee (born 1948, England, nf)
- Ida Lee (1865–1943, Australia/England, nf/p)
- John A. Lee (1891–1982, N Zealand, nf)
- Laurie Lee (1914–1997, England, f/nf)
- Miranda Lee (1945–2021, Australia, f)
- Rawdon Briggs Lee (1845–1908, England, nf)
- Sharon Lee (born 1952, US, f)
- Sidney Lee (1859–1926, England, nf)
- Stan Lee (1922–2018, US, f)
- Tanith Lee (1947–2015, England, f/ch/p)
- Vernon Lee (1856–1935, France/Italy, f/nf), pseudonym of Violet Paget
- Eugene Jacob Lee-Hamilton (1845–1907, England/Italy, p)
- Owen Leeming (born 1930, N Zealand, p/d)
- Valentine Leeper (1900–2001, Australia, nf)
- James Lees-Milne (1908–1997, England, nf/f)
- Robert Leeson (1928–2013, England, f/d)
- Mohamed Leftah (1946–2008, Morocco, f/nf)
- Michele Leggott (born 1956, N Zealand, p)
- Óláfr Leggsson (fl. 13th c., Iceland, p)
- Dennis Lehane (born 1965, US, f)
- David Lehman (born 1948, US, p/nf)
- Geoffrey Lehmann (born 1940, Australia, p/ch)
- Ágnes Lehóczky (born 1976, Hungary, p/nf)
- Fritz Leiber (1910–1992, US, f/p/d)
- Gottfried Wilhelm Leibniz (1646–1716, Germany, nf)
- Ludwig Leichhardt (1813 – c. 1848, Germany/Australia, nf)
- Gunnlaugr Leifsson (died 1218 or 1219, Iceland, nf/p)
- Thorarinn Leifsson (born 1966, Iceland, ch/f/d)
- Dorothy Leigh (died c. 1616, England, nf/p)
- Julia Leigh (born 1970, Australia, f/d)
- Richard Leigh (1650–1728, England, p/nf)
- Laura Leiner (born 1985, Hungary, ch)
- Eino Leino (1878–1926, Finland, p/nf)
- Murray Leinster (1896–1975, US, f/d), pseudonym of Will F. Jenkins
- Brad Leithauser (born 1953, US, p/f/nf)
- Emilio Álvarez Lejarza (1884–1969, Nicaragua, nf)
- Jónína Leósdóttir (born 1954, Iceland, f/d/nf)
- Michel Leiris (1901–1990, France, f/p)
- Anthony Lejeune (1928–2018, England, nf/f)
- John Leland (1503–1552, England, p/nf)
- Stanisław Lem (1921–2006, Poland, f/nf)
- Steinar Lem (1951–2009, Norway, f/nf)
- Elieshi Lema (born 1949, Tanzania, p/ch/f)
- Vesna Lemaić (born 1981, Yugoslavia/Slovenia, f)
- Jean Lemaire de Belges (c. 1473 – c. 1525, Flanders, p/nf)
- Pedro Lemebel (1952–2015, Chile, nf/f)
- Paulo Leminski (1944–1989, Brazil, p/nf/f)
- Alfred Lemm (1889–1918, Germany, nf)
- Mark Lemon (1809–1870, England, nf/d/p)
- Ahmed Lemsih (born 1950, Morocco, p)
- Aïcha Lemsine (born 1942, Algeria, f/nf), pseudonym of Aïcha Laidi
- Alexander Lenard (1910–1972, Hungary/Brazil, nf/p), born Sándor Lénárd
- Nikolaus Lenau (1802–1850, Austria-Hungary, p), pseudonym of Nikolaus Franz Niembsch Edler von Strehlenau
- Vicente Leñero (1933–2014, Mexico, f/d/nf)
- Madeleine L'Engle (1918–2007, US, f/p/ch)
- Jelena Lengold (born 1959, Serbia, p/f)
- Melchior Lengyel (1880–1974, Hungary, d)
- Sue Lenier (born 1957, England, p/d)
- Lalitha Lenin (born 1946, India, p/f/nf)
- Krystyna Lenkowska (born 1947, Poland, p)
- Ellen Lenneck (1851–1880, Germany, f), pseudonym of Martha Julie Antoinette Helene Weichardt
- Jacob van Lennep (1802–1868, Netherlands, p/f)
- Anna Maria Lenngren (1754–1817, Sweden, p)
- J. Michael Lennon (born 1942, US, nf)
- Charlotte Lennox (c. 1730–1804, Gibraltar/England, f/d/p)
- Lois Lenski (1893–1974, US, ch/nf)
- Michael Lentz (born 1964, Germany, f/p)
- Michel Lentz (1820–1893, Luxembourg, p)
- Jakob Michael Reinhold Lenz (1751–1792, Russian E, p/d/nf)
- Siegfried Lenz (1926–2014, Germany, f/nf/d)
- Adriano González León (1931–2008, Venezuela, f/p)
- Donna Leon (born 1942, US/Switzerland, f/nf)
- Magdalena León de Leal (born 1939, Colombia, nf)
- Elmore Leonard (1925–2013, US, f/d)
- John Leonard (born 1965, England/Australia, p/nf)
- Tom Leonard (1944–2018, Scotland, p/nf/f)
- Giorgi Leonidze (1899–1966, Russian E/USSR, p/nf)
- Leonid Leonov (1899–1994, Russia/USSR, f/d)
- Giacomo Leopardi (1798–1837, Italy, nf/p)
- Luna Leopold (1915–2006, US, nf)
- Lois Gladys Leppard (1924–2008, US, ch/d)
- Paul Leppin (1878–1945, Austrian E/Czechoslovakia, f)
- Peter Lerangis (born 1955, US, ch)
- Mikhail Lermontov (1814–1841, Russian E, p/f/nf)
- Ben Lerner (born 1979, US, p/f/nf)
- Laurence Lerner (1925–2016, S Africa/England, nf/p/f)
- Alexander Lernet-Holenia (1897–1976, Austria, p/f/d)
- Penny Lernoux (1940–1989, US, nf)
- Etienne Leroux (1922–1989, S Africa, f)
- Gaston Leroux (1868–1927, France, f/d)
- Alain-René Lesage (1668–1747, France, f/d)
- Nikolai Leskov (1831–1895, Russian E, f/d/nf)
- Ann Leslie (born 1941, England, nf)
- Bolesław Leśmian (1877–1937, Russian E/Poland, p)
- Ľuba Lesná (born 1954, Czechoslovakia/Slovakia, nf/f/d)
- Orígenes Lessa (1903–1986, Brazil, f/nf)
- Rika Lesser (born 1953, US, p)
- Doris Lessing (1919–2013, S Rhodesia/England, f)
- Gotthold Ephraim Lessing (1729–1781, Germany, nf/d)
- Dewi Lestari (born 1976, Indonesia, f/p)
- Helen Lester (born 1936, US, ch/nf)
- Julius Lester (1939–2018, US, ch/f/nf/p)
- Roger L'Estrange (1616–1704, England, nf)
- Mabel Lethbridge (1900–1968, England, nf)
- Jonathan Lethem (born 1964, US, f/nf)
- Julie Elizabeth Leto (living, US, f)
- Reinhard Lettau (1929–1996, Germany/US, f/nf)
- Winifred Mary Letts (1882–1972, England/Ireland, f/d/p)
- Leucippus (fl. 5th c. BCE, Greece, nf)
- Santeri Levas (1899–1987, Finland, nf), born Santeri Lehmann
- Charles Lever (1806–1872, Ireland/Italy, f)
- Lilian Leveridge (1879–1953, England/Canada, f/nf/p)
- Oscar Levertin (1862–1906, Sweden, p/nf)
- Denise Levertov (1923–1997, England/US, p/nf)
- Henry Jean-Marie Levet (1874–1906, France, p/nf)
- Robin Levett (1925–2008, Australia, nf/f)
- Primo Levi (1919–1987, Italy, f/nf/p)
- Thomas Levi (1825–1916, Wales, nf/ch)
- Barbara Levick (1932–2023, England, nf)
- Dana Levin (born 1965, US, p)
- Gail Levin (born 1948, US, nf)
- Tanya Levin (born 1971, Australia, nf)
- Gail Carson Levine (born 1947, US, ch)
- Philip Levine, 1928–2015, US, p)
- Stacey Levine (living, US, f/nf)
- Paul Levinson (born 1947, US, f/nf)
- Larry Levis (1946–1996, US, p)
- David Levithan (born 1972, US, ch)
- Fran Levstik (1831–1887, Austrian E, f/nf)
- Amy Levy (1861–1889, England, nf/p/f)
- Andrea Levy (1956–2019, England, f)
- D. A. Levy (1942–1968, US, p)
- Deborah Levy (born 1959, S Africa/England, f/d/p)
- Marc Levy (born 1961, France, f)
- William Levy (1939–2019, US/Netherlands, nf/d)
- Emma Lew (born 1962, Australia, p)
- Fanny Lewald (1811–1889, Germany, f/nf)
- Betsy Lewin (born 1937, US, ch/nf)
- Ted Lewin (1935–2021, US, ch), born Theodore Peter Lewin
- Oswald LeWinter (1931–2013, Austria/US, nf)
- Alethea Lewis (1749–1827, England, f)
- Alun Lewis (1915–1944, Wales, p)
- C. S. Lewis (1898–1963, N Ireland/England, f/nf)
- D. B. Wyndham Lewis (1891–1969,
- Deborah Lewis (1942–2006, US, f), pseudonym of Charles L. Grant
- Eiluned Lewis (1900–1979, Wales, f/p/d)
- George Cornewall Lewis (1806–1863, England, nf)
- Gwyneth Lewis (born 1959, Wales, p)
- Helen Lewis (born 1983, England, nf)
- Henry Lewis (1889–1968, Wales, nf)
- Hilda Lewis (1896–1974, England, f/ch)
- Hywel Lewis (1910–1992, Wales, nf)
- J. Patrick Lewis (born 1942, US, p/ch)
- J. S. Lewis (born 1972, US, ch)
- Linda Lewis (born 1950, US, ch)
- Matthew Lewis (1775–1818, England, f/d)
- Naomi Lewis (1911–2009, England, p/nf/ch)
- Robyn Léwis (1929–2019, Wales, nf)
- Roger Lewis (born 1960, Wales, nf)
- Saunders Lewis (1893–1985, Wales, nf/p/d)
- Sinclair Lewis (1885–1951, US, f/d/p)
- Susan Lewis (born 1956, England, f/nf)
- Ted Lewis (1940–1982, England, f)
- Wendy Lewis (born 1962, Australia, nf/d)
- D. B. Wyndham Lewis (1891–1969, England, nf)
- Wyndham Lewis (1882–1957, Canada/England, f/nf)
- Sibylle Lewitscharoff (1954–2023, Germany, f/nf/d)
- Łewond (Leontius, fl. late 8th c., Armenia, nf)
- Guenter Lewy (1923–2026, US, nf)
- Marina Lewycka (1946–2025, Ukraine/England, f/nf)
- Alice Chetwynd Ley (1913–2004, England, f)
- John Leyden (1775–1811, Scotland/India, nf)
- Nell Leyshon (living, England, f/d/nf)
- Sophie Leyton (1928–2009, England), pseudonym of Sheila O'Nions Walsh
- Justin Lhérisson (1872–1907, Haiti, f/nf/p)
- François Tristan l'Hermite (c. 1601–1655, France, f/d)
- Edward Lhuyd (1660–1709, Wales/England, nf)

== Li ==
- Li Ao (李翱, 772–841, China, nf)
- Li Ao (李敖, 1935–2018, China, nf)
- Li Bai (李白, 701-762, China, p)
- Li Baiyao (李百藥, 564–647, China, nf)
- Li Baojia (李寶嘉, 1867–1906, China, nf/p)
- Bella Li (born 1983, China/Australia, p)
- C. C. Li (李寶嘉, 1912–2003, China/US, nf)
- Li Chunfeng (李淳風, 602–670, China, nf)
- Li Dashi (李大師, 570–628, China, nf)
- Li Delin (李德林, c. 531 – c. 591, China, nf)
- Li Fang (李昉, 925–996, China, nf)
- Li He (李賀, c. 790–791 – c. 816–817, China, p)
- Li Jiao (李嶠, died post-710 CE, China, nf)
- Li Jing (李靖, 571–649, China, nf)
- Li Kui (李悝, 455–395 BCE, China, nf)
- Li Li (李笠, born 1961, China/Sweden, p)
- Li Qingzhao (李清照, 1084 – c. 1155, China, p/nf)
- Li Rui (李锐, born 1949, China, f)
- Li Shangyin (李商隱, c. 813–858, China, p)
- Li Shanlan (李善蘭, 1810–1882, China, nf)
- Li Shicen (李石岑, 1892–1934, China, nf)
- Li Shizhen (李時珍, 1518–1593, China, nf)
- Li Shizhi (李適之, died 747, China, p/nf)
- Li Ye (李治, died 784, China, p)
- Li Yu (李煜, c. 937–978, China, p)
- Li Yu (李漁, 1610–1680, China, d/f)
- Li Zhenyu (厲振羽, living, China, nf)
- Li Zhi (李贄, 1527–1602, China, nf)
- Marita Liabø (born 1971, Norway, f/ch)
- Liang Desheng (梁德繩, 1771–1847, China, f/p)
- Liang Qichao (梁啓超, 1873–1929, China, nf)
- Liang Shuming (梁漱溟, 1893–1988, China, nf)
- Liao Yiwu (廖亦武, born 1958, China, nf/p)
- Tim Liardet (born 1949, England, p)
- Taddasa Liban (living, Ethiopia, f)
- Laura Jean Libbey (1862–1924, US, f)
- Héctor Libertella (1945–2006, Argentina, f/nf)
- Georg Christoph Lichtenberg (1742–1799, Germany, nf)
- Jacqueline Lichtenberg (born 1942, US, f)
- Herbert Lichtenfeld (1927–2001, Germany, d)
- Alfred Lichtenstein (1889–1914, Germany/France, p/f)
- Ignatz Lichtenstein (1824–1908, Hungary, nf)
- Isabella Lickbarrow (1784–1847, England, p)
- Sara Lidman (1923–2004, Sweden, f)
- Bernt Lie (1868–1916, Norway, f)
- Jonas Lie (1833–1908, Norway, f/p/d)
- Tove Lie (1942–2000, Norway, p)
- Simcha Lieberman (1929–2009, Poland/England, nf)
- Jerzy Liebert (1904–1931, Poland, p)
- Karen Liebreich (born 1959, England, nf)
- Eduardo Liendo (1941–2025, Venezuela, f)
- Heinz Liepmann (1905–1966, Germany/Switzerland, f/nf)
- Amandina Lihamba (born 1944, Tanzania, d/ch)
- Enrique Lihn (1929–1988, Chile, p/d/f)
- Gabriel Liiceanu (born 1942, Romania, nf)
- Juhan Liiv (1864–1913, Russian E, p/f)
- Muthoni Likimani (born 1926, Kenya, f/nf)
- Werewere Liking (born 1950, Cameroon/Ivory Coast, f/d)
- Vladana Likar-Smiljanić (born 1943, Yugoslavia/Serbia, ch/nf)
- Tim Lilburn (born 1950, Canada, p/nf)
- Detlev von Liliencron (1844–1909, Germany, p/f)
- Irmelin Sandman Lilius (born 1936, Finland, ch/f/p)
- Kate Lilley (born 1960, Australia, p)
- Baldomero Lillo (1867–1923, Chile, nf)
- Shirley Geok-lin Lim (born 1944, Malaya/US, p/f/nf)
- Aristides Fraga Lima (1923 – c. 1996, Brazil, ch)
- Augusto de Lima (1859–1934, Brazil, p/nf)
- Conceição Lima (born 1961, São Tomé and Príncipe, p)
- José Lezama Lima (1910–1976, Cuba, p/f/nf)
- Rossy Evelin Lima (born 1986, Mexico, p)
- Eduard Limonov (1943–2020, Soviet Union/Russia, f/nf)
- Grace Lin (born 1974, US, ch)
- Jeannie Lin (living, US, f)
- Lin Haiyin (林海音, 1918–2001, China, f)
- Lin Huiyin (林徽因, 1904–1955, China, p/nf/d)
- Lin Shu (林紓, 1852–1924, China, nf)
- Tao Lin (林韜, born 1983, US, f/p/nf)
- Lin Yutang (林語堂, 1899–1976, China/Hong Kong, nf/f)
- Lin Zongsu (林宗素, 1878–1944, China, nf)
- Jüri Lina (born 1949, Estonia, nf/f/d)
- Kurt Linck (1889 – post-1926, Germany, nf)
- Lizzy Lind af Hageby (1878–1963, Sweden/England, nf)
- Paul Lindau (1839–1919, Germany, d/f)
- Sofie Aubert Lindbæk (1875–1953, Norway, f/nf)
- Anne Lindbergh (1940–1993, US, ch)
- Reeve Lindbergh (born 1945, US, nf/ch)
- Anne Morrow Lindbergh (1906–2001, US, nf/p)
- Unni Lindell (born 1957, Norway, f/p/ch)
- Jack Lindeman (living, US, p)
- Eddie Linden (1935–2023, Scotland/England, p/nf)
- Astrid Lindgren (1907–2002, Sweden, ch/f/d)
- Barbro Lindgren (born 1937, Sweden, ch/f)
- Torgny Lindgren (1938–2017, Sweden, p/f)
- Herman Lindqvist (born 1943, Sweden, nf)
- John Ajvide Lindqvist (born 1968, Sweden, f)
- Sven Lindqvist (1932–2019, Sweden, nf)
- Jack Lindsay (1900–1990, Australia/England, f/d/p)
- Joan Lindsay (1896–1984, Australia, f/d/nf)
- Norman Lindsay (1879–1969, Australia, f/ch/p)
- Philip Lindsay (1906–1958, Australia/England, f/nf)
- Rose Lindsay (1885–1978, Australia, nf)
- Sarah Lindsay (born 1958, US, p)
- Vachel Lindsay (1879–1931, US, p)
- Hilde Lindset (born 1978, Norway, f)
- Johanna Lindsey (1952–2019, US, f)
- Eva Lindström (born 1952, Sweden, ch)
- Fredrik Lindström (born 1963, Sweden, nf)
- Merethe Lindstrøm (born 1963, Norway, f/ch)
- Marian Lines (1933–2012, England, d/ch)
- Ling Li (凌力, 1942–2018, China, f)
- Ling Mengchu (凌濛初, 1580–1644, China, f)
- Ling Shuhua (凌叔华, 1904–1990, China, f)
- Freda Lingstrom (1893–1989, England, ch/f/nf)
- Anton Tomaž Linhart (1756–1795, Habsburg E, d/nf)
- Eric Linklater (1899–1974, Wales/Scotland, p/f/nf)
- Art Linkletter (1912–2010, Canada/US, ch)
- Pentti Linkola (1932–2020, Finland, nf)
- Väinö Linna (1920–1992, Finland, f)
- Carl Linnaeus (1707–1778, Sweden, nf)
- Johannes Linnankoski (1869–1913, Finland, f)
- Jonas Carl Linnerhielm (1758–1829, Sweden, nf)
- Osman Lins (1924–1978, Brazil, f)
- Paulo Lins (born 1958, Brazil, nf/f)
- Mary Linskill (1840–1891, England, f/p)
- Léa Linster (born 1955, Luxembourg, nf)
- Charles de Lint (born 1951, Netherlands/Canada, f/p)
- Eliza Lynn Linton (1822–1898, England, f/nf)
- Leo Lionni (1910–1999, Italy/US, ch)
- Ken Lipenga (born 1952, Nyasaland/Malawi, f/nf)
- Elinor Lipman (born 1950, US, f/nf)
- George Lippard (1822–1854, US, f/d/nf)
- Laura Lippman (born 1959, US, f)
- Ewa Lipska (born 1945, Poland/Austria, p)
- Florjan Lipuš (born 1937, Austria, f/nf), pseudonym Boro Kostanek
- Henriqueta Lisboa (1901–1985, Brazil, p/nf)
- Irene Lisboa (1892–1958, Portugal, f/p/nf)
- Gloria Lisé (born 1961, Argentina, f/nf)
- Leconte de Lisle (1818–1894, France, p)
- Clarice Lispector (1920–1977, USSR/Brazil, f)
- Robert Lissauer (1917–2004, US, nf)
- H. G. de Lisser (1878–1944, Jamaica, nf/f)
- Anne Lister (1791–1840, England, nf)
- S. E. Lister (born 1988, England, f)
- Thomas Henry Lister (1800–1842, England, f/nf)
- László Listi (died 1662, Hungary, p)
- Carol Liston (living, Australia, nf)
- Ellen Liston (1838–1885, Australia, f/p)
- Jessie Litchfield (1883–1956, Australia, f/nf/p)
- John Lithgow (born 1945, US, f/nf)
- June Margaret Litman (1926–1991, N Zealand, nf)
- Jean Little (1932–2020, Canada, ch/nf)
- Linda Little (born 1959, Canada, f)
- Alison Littlewood (living, England, f)
- Liu Bowen (劉伯溫, 1311–1375, China), pseudonym of Liu Ji (劉基)
- Liu Cixin (刘慈欣, born 1963, China, f)
- Liu E (劉鶚, 1857–1909, China, nf)
- Eric Liu (劉柏川, born 1968, Taiwan/US, nf)
- Liu Heng (刘恒, China, nf)
- Liu Hui (劉徽, fl. 3rd c. CE, China, nf)
- Liu Rushi (柳如是, 1618–1664, China, p)
- Liu Tong (刘侗, c. 1593–1637, China, f/nf)
- Liu Xiang (劉向, 77–6 BCE, China, nf/p)
- Liu Xiaobo (刘晓波, 1955–2017, China, nf)
- Liu Xie (劉勰, fl. 5th c. CE, China, nf)
- Liu Xin (劉歆, 50 BCE – 23 CE, China, nf)
- Liu Xinwu (劉心武, born 1942, China, f/ch)
- Liu Xinglong (劉醒龍, born 1956, China, f/p)
- Liu Ying (柳营, born 1974, China, f)
- Liu Yong (柳永, 987–1053, China, p)
- Liu Yuxi (劉禹錫, 772–842, China, p/nf)
- Liu Zhenyun (刘震云, born 1958, China, f/d)
- Liu Zhi (劉秩, fl. 8th c. CE, China, nf)
- Liu Zhiji (劉知幾, 661–721, China, nf)
- Liu Zongyuan (柳宗元, 773–819, China, nf/p)
- Adam Lively (born 1961, England, f/nf)
- Penelope Lively (born 1933, England, f/ch/nf)
- Douglas Livingstone (1932–1996, Malaya/S Africa, p)
- José Joaquín Fernández de Lizardi (1776–1827, Mexico, f/nf)

== Lj–Lo ==
- Draga Ljočić (1855–1926, Serbia/Yugoslavia, nf)
- Stjepan Mitrov Ljubiša (1824–1878, Austria E/Austria-Hungary, f)
- Maria Gabriela Llansol (1931–2008, Portugal, f/nf)
- Kate Llewellyn (born 1936, Australia, nf)
- Richard Llewellyn (1906–1983, England, f), pseudonym of Richard Dafydd Vivian Llewellyn Lloyd
- Numa Pompilio Llona (1932–2007, Ecuador, p/nf)
- Mario Vargas Llosa (born 1936, Peru, f/nf/ch)
- Dorothy Jordan Lloyd (1889–1946, England, nf)
- John Lloyd (born 1951, England, nf)
- Julia Lloyd (1867–1955, England, nf)
- John Lloyd-Jones (1885–1956, Wales/Ireland, nf/p)
- William Watkiss Lloyd (1813–1893, England, nf)
- Ramon Llull (c. 1232 – c. 1315/1316, Spain, nf/p)
- Alan Llwyd (born 1948, Wales, p/nf)
- Angharad Llwyd (1780–1966, Wales, nf)
- Martha Llwyd (1766–1845, Wales, p)
- Morgan Llwyd (1619–1659, Wales, p)
- Richard Llwyd (1752–1835, Wales/England, p/nf)
- Robin Llywelyn (born 1958, Wales, f)
- Ali Lmrabet (born 1959, Morocco, nf)
- Đorđe Lobačev (1909–2002, Serbia/Soviet Union, f)
- Monteiro Lobato (1882–1948, Brazil, f/nf/ch)
- Arnold Lobel (1933–1987, US, ch)
- António Lobo Antunes (1942–2026, Portugal, f/nf)
- Francisco Rodrigues Lobo (1580–1622, Portugal, p/nf)
- Józef Łobodowski (1909–1988, Poland, p/nf)
- Joice NanKivell Loch (1887–1882, Australia, f/nf)
- Liz Lochhead (born 1947, Scotland, p/d)
- Attica Locke (born 1974, US, f/d)
- Elsie Locke (1912–2001, N Zealand, nf/ch)
- John Locke (1632–1704, England, nf)
- Lilian Locke (1869–1950, Australia, nf/f)
- Sumner Locke (1881–1917, Australia, f/d/p)
- Terry Locke (born 1946, N Zealand, p/nf)
- William John Locke (1863–1930, England, f/d)
- Frederick Locker-Lampson (1821–1895, England, nf/p)
- Aké Loba (1927–2012, Ivory Coast/France, f)
- Monteiro Lobato (1882–1948, Brazil, ch/f/nf)
- Mira Lobe (1913–1995, Austria/E Germany, ch), born Hilde Mirjam Rosenthal
- John Gibson Lockhart (1794–1854, Scotland, nf/p)
- Frances Louise Lockridge (1896–1963, US, f)
- Richard Lockridge (1898–1982, US, f)
- Ross Lockridge Jr. (1914–1948, US, f)
- Patricia Lockwood (born 1982, US, p/f/nf)
- David Lodge (born 1935, England, f/d)
- Oliver Lodge (1851–1940, England, nf)
- Thomas Lodge (c. 1558–1625, England, d/p/nf)
- Steinar Løding (born 1950, Norway, f)
- Jón Örn Loðmfjörð (born 1983, Iceland, p)
- John Lodwick (1916–1959, England, f/nf)
- Erlend Loe (born 1969, Norway, f/nf/ch)
- Anna Rutgers van der Loeff (1910–1990, Netherlands, ch)
- Erich Loest (1926–2013, Germany, f)
- Hugo Loetscher (1929–2009, Switzerland, nf)
- Capel Lofft (1751–1824, England/Italy, nf)
- Hugh Lofting (1886–1947, England/US, ch)
- Norah Lofts (1904–1983, England, f/nf)
- John Logan (1748–1788, Scotland, nf/p)
- Friedrich von Logau (1605–1655, Germany, p/nf)
- Daniel Casper von Lohenstein (1635–1683, Germany, d/nf/p)
- Amanda Lohrey (born 1947, Australia, f/nf)
- Ivar Lo-Johansson (1901–1990, Sweden, f/nf)
- Lesley Lokko (born 1964, Scotland/Ghana, f/nf)
- Rasmus Løland (1861–1907, Norway, nf/f/ch)
- Iain Lom (c. 1624 – c. 1710, Scotland, p)
- Amélia da Lomba (born 1961, Angola, nf)
- Niko Lomouri (1852–1915, Russian E, p/f/ch)
- Hilary London (1924–2022, England, f), pseudonym of Nancy Buckingham and John Sawyer
- Jack London (1876–1916, US, f/nf)
- Joan London (born 1948, Australia, f/d)
- Ruth Frances Long (born 1971, Ireland, f)
- Tania Long (1913–1998, Germany/Canada, nf)
- William Stuart Long (1914–1986, England, f), pseudonym of Violet Vivian Finlay Stuart Mann
- Henry Wadsworth Longfellow (1807–1882, US, p)
- Elizabeth Longford (1906–2002, England, nf)
- Michael Longley (1939–2025, N Ireland, p)
- Abie Longstaff (living, Australia/England, ch)
- Barry B. Longyear (born 1942, US, f)
- Iain Lonie (1932–1988, England/N Zealand, p/nf)
- Jean Lonie (1930–1997, N Zealand, p)
- Judith Lonie (1935–1982, Australia/N Zealand, p)
- Øystein Lønn (1936–2022, Norway, f)
- Hermann Löns (1866–1914, Germany, f/p)
- Frederick Lonsdale (1881–1954, England, d)
- Henry Lonsdale (1816–1876, England, nf)
- Roger Lonsdale (1934–2022, England, nf)
- Sergio Loo (1982–2014, Mexico, p)
- Hendrik Willem van Loon (1882–1944, Netherlands/US, nf/ch)
- J. Thomas Looney (1870–1944, England, nf)
- Anita Loos (1888–1981, US, d/f)
- Jacobus van Looy (1855–1930, Netherlands, nf)
- Carlos Lopes (born 1960, Guinea-Bissau, nf)
- Fernão Lopes (c. 1385 – post-1459, Portugal, nf)
- Henri Lopes (1937–2023, Republic of the Congo, f/nf)
- Manuel Lopes (1907–2005, Cape Verde/Portugal, f/p/nf)
- Barry Lopez (1945–2020, US, nf/f)
- Michelle Lora (born 1968, Ivory Coast, nf/ch)
- E. C. R. Lorac (1894–1958, England, f)
- Jakob Lorber (1800–1864, Austria, nf)
- Federico García Lorca (1898–1936, Spain, p)
- Gabrielle Lord (born 1946, Australia, f/nf)
- Robert Lord (1945–1992, N Zealand, d)
- Audre Lorde (1934–1992, US, nf)
- Rudolf Lorenzen (1922–2013, Germany, f)
- László L. Lőrincz (born 1939, Hungary, f)
- F. G. Loring (1869–1951, England, nf/p/f)
- Jean Lorrah (born 1940, US, f)
- Claire Lorrimer (1921–2016, England, f), pseudonym of Patricia Denise Robins
- Guillaume de Lorris (c. 1200 – c. 1240, France, nf/p)
- Ernst Lothar (1890–1974, Austrian E/Austria, f)
- Rudolf Lothar (1865–1943, Hungary/Austria, d/f/nf)
- Pierre Loti (1850–1923, France, f)
- Marguerite St. Leon Loud (1812-1889, US, p)
- Jane Wells Webb Loudon (1807–1858, England, f/nf)
- John Claudius Loudon (1783–1843, Scotland/England, nf)
- Peter Lourie (born 1952, US, nf/ch)
- Jean-Baptiste Tati Loutard (1938–2009, Republic of the Congo, p/nf)
- Pierre Louÿs (1870–1925, Belgium/France, f/p)
- Anna M. Louw (1913–2003, S Africa, f)
- H. P. Lovecraft (1890–1937, US, f)
- Alexander Loveday (1888–1962, England, nf)
- Cecilie Løveid (born 1951, Norway, f/p/ch)
- Earl Lovelace (born 1935, Trinidad, f/d)
- Richard Lovelace (1617–1657, England, p)
- Henry Lovelich (fl. mid-15th c., England, p)
- Rosalie Loveling (1834–1875, Belgium, p/f/nf)
- Virginie Loveling (1836–1923, Belgium, p/f/ch)
- Samuel Lover (1797–1868, Ireland, f/p)
- Eugen Lovinescu (1881–1943, Romania, nf/f)
- Dorothy Mackie Low (1916–2002, Scotland/England, f), pseudonym of Lois Dorothea Low
- Helen Lowe (born 1961, N Zealand, f)
- Stephen Lowe (born 1947, England, d)
- Amy Lowell (1874–1925, US, p)
- James Russell Lowell (1819–1891, US, p/nf)
- Elizabeth Lowell (born 1944, US, f/nf), pseudonym of Ann Maxwell
- Maria White Lowell (1821–1853, US, p)
- Robert Lowell (1917–1977, US, p)
- Margaret Lowenfeld (1890–1973, England, nf)
- Johann von Löwenstern-Kunckel (1630–1703, Germany, nf)
- Solomon Löwisohn (1788 or 1789–1821, Hungary, p/nf)
- Paul B. Lowney (1917–2007, US, f/nf)
- Brigid Lowry (born 1953, N Zealand, ch/p/f)
- Henry Dawson Lowry (1869–1906, England, f/p)
- Lois Lowry (born 1937, US, ch)
- Malcolm Lowry (1909–1957, England, p/f)
- Mina Loy (1882–1966, England/US, p/d/f)

== Lu–Ly ==
- Lü Bicheng (呂碧城, 1883–1943, China, nf/p)
- Lu Guimeng (陸龜蒙, died 881 CE, China, p)
- Lu Haodong (陸皓東, 1868–1895, China, nf)
- Lu Ji (陸機, 261–303, China, p/nf)
- Marie Lu (陸希未, born 1984, China/US, ch)
- Min Lu (1954–2013, Burma/Myanmar, f/p/d)
- Lu Tong (盧仝, 790–835, China, p)
- Lu Xun (魯迅, 1881–1936, China, nf/p)
- Lu You (陸游, 1125–1209, China, p)
- Lu Zhi (盧摯, c. 1243–1315, China, p)
- Bonnie Lubega (born 1929, Uganda, f/nf)
- Percy Lubbock (1879–1965, England, nf)
- Stanisław Herakliusz Lubomirski (1642–1702, Poland, p/d/nf)
- Lubwa p'Chong (1946–1997, Uganda, d/p)
- Christine De Luca (born 1947, Scotland, p/f)
- Gherasim Luca (1913–1994, Romania/France, nf/p)
- Lucan (39–65 CE, Roman E, p), full name Marcus Annaeus Lucanus
- Tim Lucas (born 1956, US, nf/f)
- Melissa Lucashenko (born 1967, Australia, f/nf/ch)
- Rafael Arráiz Lucca (born 1959, Venezuela, nf/p)
- Lucebert (1924–1994, Netherlands, p), pseudonym of Lubertus Jacobus Swaanswijk
- James Luceno (born 1947, US, f/nf)
- Lucidor (1638–1674, Sweden, p), pseudonym of Lars Johansson
- Edward Lucie-Smith (born 1933, England, p/nf)
- Gaius Lucilius (died 103 BCE, Rome, p)
- Lucilius Junior (fl. 1st c. CE, Roman E, p)
- Lucretius (c. 99 – c. 55 BCE, Rome, p)
- Fitz Hugh Ludlow (1836–1870, US, nf/f)
- Edith Gyömrői Ludowyk (1896–1987, Hungary/England, p/nf)
- Emil Ludwig (1881–1948, Germany/Switzerland, d/f)
- Otto Ludwig (1813–1865, Germany, d/f/nf)
- Lya Luft (1938–2021, Brazil, nf)
- Kristina Lugn (1948–2020, Sweden, p/d)
- Leopoldo Lugones (1874–1938, Argentina, p/f/nf)
- Nina Lugovskaya (1918–1993, Russia/USSR, nf)
- Tamara Lujak (born 1976, Yugoslavia/Serbia, f/nf)
- John Lukacs (1924–2019, Hungary/US, nf)
- Luke the Evangelist (c. 1st c. CE, Roman E, nf)
- Dragan Lukić (1928–2006, Yugoslavia/Serbia, ch)
- Svetlana Lukić (born 1958, Yugoslavia/Serbia, nf)
- Tatjana Lukić (1959–2008, Yugoslavia/Australia, p)
- Vladimir Lukov (born 1949, Bulgaria, p)
- Stevan M. Luković (1877–1902, Serbia, p)
- Sergey Lukyanenko (born 1968, Soviet Union/Russia, f)
- Catharine Lumby (living, Australia, nf)
- Jean-Pierre Luminet (born 1951, France, nf/p)
- Jane Lumley, Baroness Lumley (1537–1578, England, nf/d)
- Joanna Lumley (born 1946, India/England, nf)
- Louisa Lumsden (1840–1935, Scotland, nf)
- Violeta Luna (born 1943, Ecuador, p/nf)
- Duncan Lunan (born 1945, Scotland, nf/f)
- Guðrún frá Lundi (1887–1975, Iceland, f/p)
- Dan Lungu (born 1969, Romania, f/p/d)
- Artur Lundkvist (1906–1991, Sweden, p/f/nf)
- Janet Lunn (1928–2017, Canada, ch), born Janet Swoboda
- Luo Binwang (駱賓王, c. 619 – c. 684, China, p)
- Luo Guanzhong (羅貫中, c. 1330–1400 or c. 1280–1360, China, f)
- Luo Luo (落落, born 1982, China, f)
- Luo Yin (羅隱, c. 833–910, China, p)
- Lüqiu Luwei (闾丘露薇, born 1969, China, nf)
- Francisco Arízaga Luque (1900–1964, Ecuador, p/f/nf)
- Francisco Herrera Luque (1927–1991, Venezuela, f)
- Johanan Luria (late 15th – early 16th c., Germany/France, nf)
- Emilio Lussu (1890–1975, Italy, nf)
- Edgar Lustgarten (1907–1978, England, f)
- Maria Kuncewiczowa (1834–1908, Duchy of Warsaw, p/f/nf)
- Martin Luther (1483–1546, Germany, nf)
- Henry Luttrell (c. 1765–1851, England, nf)
- Elizabeth Lutyens (1874–1964, England, nf)
- Deborah Lutz (born 1970, US, f)
- John Lutz (1939–2021, US, f)
- William Luvaas (born 1945, US, f)
- Thomas Lux (1946–2017, US, p)
- Mario Luzi (1914–2005, Italy, p)
- John Lwanda (born 1949, Nyasaland/Malawi, nf/p)
- Thakin Lwin (1914–1996, Burma/Myanmar, nf)
- Andrew Lycett (born 1948, England, nf)
- Lycurgus of Athens (c. 390–324 BCE, Greece, nf)
- John Lydgate (c. 1370 – c. 1451, England, p)
- Alexis Lykiard (born 1940, Greece/England, f/p)
- Marius Lyle (1872–1964, England/N Ireland, f), pseudonym of Una Maud Lyle Smyth
- John Lyly (1553 or 1554–1606, England, p/d)
- Arthur Lynch (1861–1934, Australia/Ireland, p/nf)
- Benito Lynch (1885–1951, Argentina, f)
- Karen Lynch (born 1967, Canada/US, f/ch)
- Lisa Lynch (1979–2013, England, nf)
- Patricia Lynch (c. 1894–1972, Ireland, f/ch)
- Robert Wilson Lynd (1879–1949, Ireland/England, p/nf)
- Sylvia Lynd (1888–1952, Ireland/England, p/nf/f), born Sylvia Dryhurst
- Donald Lynden-Bell (1935–2018, England, nf)
- Dennis Lynds (1924–2005, US, f), pseudonym Michael Collins
- Gayle Lynds (born 1945, US, f)
- David Lyndsay (c. 1490 – c. 1555, Scotland, p)
- Sandford Lyne (1945–2007, US, p)
- J. J. Lynx (c. 1900 – post-1965, Germany/England, nf)
- Frances Lynn (living, England, f/nf)
- Kenneth S. Lynn (1923–2001, US, nf)
- Elinor Lyon (1921–2008, England/Wales, ch)
- Joshua Lyon (born 1974, US, nf)
- P. H. B. Lyon (1893–1986, England, p/nf)
- Enid Lyons (1897–1981, Australia, nf)
- Lysias (c. 445 – c. 380, Greece, nf)
- Edith Joan Lyttleton (1873–1945, N Zealand, f), pseudonym G. B. Lancaster
- George Lyttelton, 1st Baron Lyttelton (1709–1773, England, p/nf)
- Rosina Bulwer Lytton (1802–1883, England, f/nf)
