= Eileen Ramsay =

Eileen Ramsay may refer to

- Eileen Ramsay (author) (1940–2023), British author
- Eileen Ramsay (photographer) (1915–2017), British photographer
