= Antoinette Sterling =

Anglo-American vocalist

Antoinette Sterling Mackinlay
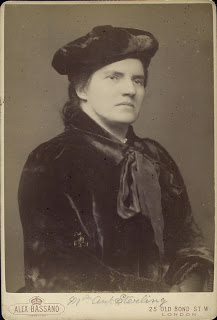

Background information
- Also known as: Madame Antoinette Sterling
- Born: Jane Antoinette Sterling; January 23, 1841; Sterlingville, Town of Philadelphia, New York, U.S
- Died: January 10, 1904 (aged 62) Hampstead, London, England
- Occupation: Vocalist

Jane Antoinette Sterling (January 23, 1841 – January 10, 1904) was an American contralto most known for singing sentimental ballads in Britain and the British Empire.

== Early life ==
Sterling was born in Sterlingville], New York, on January 23, 1841. Her father, James Sterling, owned large blast furnaces, and she claimed to be a descendant of William Bradford. During her childhood, she developed anti-British prejudices. Her patriotic sympathies were stirred by the story of the destruction of tea cargoes in Boston harbor and she resolved never to drink tea again; she kept this resolution for the rest of her life.

At the age of eleven she took some singing lessons from Signor Abella in New York. She then began teaching and giving singing lessons in Mississippi some time after her father's death in 1857. When the civil war started, during the summer of 1862, she fled north by night, guided by African Americans.

She became a church singer at Henry Ward Beecher's church in Brooklyn, New York. In 1868, she traveled to Europe for further training, where she sang at Darlington in Handel's Messiah on December 17 and took lessons with W. H. Cummings in London before proceeding to Germany. She studied with Pauline Viardot-Garcia and Manuel Garcia in London before returning to America in 1871 to became a concert singer.

== Professional career in England and British Empire ==
Sterling returned to England at the beginning of 1873, where she made her British singing debut in the Covent Garden Promenade Concerts and became known for singing ballads and Scotch songs.

Her first engagement in London was at the promenade concert on November 6, 1873; she choose to sing the "Slumber Song" from Bach's Christmas Oratorio and some classical Lieder. Her success at the Crystal Palace, the Royal Albert Hall, Exeter Hall, and St. James's Hall quickly followed.

In February 1874, she sang in Mendelssohn's Elijah on two consecutive nights at Exeter Hall and Albert Hall. Her repertoire was entirely oratorio music or German Lieder. There was some criticism of her singing at the time; "her style is lacking in sensibility and refinement. The excellence of voice is not all that is required in the art of vocalisation" (Athenum, 14 March). She was engaged for the Three Choirs Festival at Hereford.

On Easter Sunday, 1875, she was married at the Savoy Chapel to John MacKinlay, a Scottish American. They settled in Stanhope Place, London.

Engagements for high-class concerts gradually ceased, but she still sang in Oratorio, mainly German works, including Wagner. In 1877, she found a new vocation when Arthur Sullivan wrote "The Lost Chord" especially for her, and it attained popularity. She became drawn to simple sentimental ballads, especially those with semi-religious or moralising words and invested Caller Herrin with singular significance. In her later years, she favoured Tennyson's "Crossing the Bar" in Behrend's setting.

She sang Behrend's Crossing the Bar at a concert in Prince's Hall on Piccadilly in May 1894, along withThere is Rest for the Weary by Florence Eva Simpson .

Originally raised as a Quaker, she became a believer in Christian Science after belonging to various sects; she refused to wear fashionable low-necked dresses and received permission to wear an outfit of her own choosing at a command performance before Queen Victoria. She believed that music could move people spiritually and often sang for free in prisons.

=== Australia and New Zealand ===
In 1893, Sterling embarked on an Australasian tour for T. P. Hudson, which included Adelaide, Melbourne, and Sydney. Her husband, having grown ill, remained behind in Adelaide while she toured the rest of Australia. She sang seven times in the Centennial Hall in Sydney to crowds totaling more than 25,000. Before traveling to New Zealand, she visited schools, hospitals, and social reform associations.

When she arrived in Auckland from Sydney, she was greeted by Annie Jane Schnackenberg, national president of the Women's Christian Temperance Union of New Zealand. At their meeting at the Grand Hotel, Schnackenberg presented Sterling with a bouquet of white camellias (a suffragist symbol) and maiden hair fern "as a co-worker in the organisation." It was clear from a news article expounding on Sterling's career that her work was greatly admired: "Antoinette Sterling comes to show us how a perfect voice, perfectly educated, and controlled by a perceptive, devotional, and feeling mind, can lead us to heights and breadths and lengths and depths of musical delight such as we have not before understood."

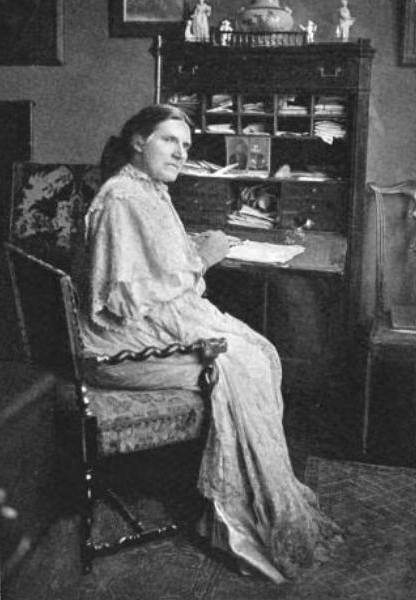
In The Sketch, August 12, 1903

On July 9, 1893, while on her way to a concert in Dunedin, she received notice of her husband's death in Australia. She continued and performed at Garrison Hall before returning to Australia.

== End of career and death ==
Sterling revisited America in 1876 and 1895 for a few months before returning to London.

In the winter of 1902–1903, her farewell tour was announced. Her last appearance was at East Ham on October 15, 1903, and the last song she sang was "Crossing the Bar".

Sterling died at her residence in Hampstead, London, on January 10, 1904, and was cremated at Golders Green, where her ashes were interred.

== Family ==
Sterling was survived by a son and a daughter, both popular vocalists at the time. After her death, her son, Malcolm Sterling Mackinlay (1876–1952), wrote about her life in Antoinette Sterling and Other Celebrities (1906 Hutchinson). Malcolm's daughter was the romance novelist Leila Antoinette Sterling Mackinlay, who was named in her honor.
