= On Call =

On-call, or on-call scheduling, is a type of employee work schedule.

On Call may also refer to:

- "On Call" (song), a 2007 song by Kings of Leon
- "On Call", a song by MUNA from their 2026 album Dancing on the Wall
- On Call, a 1974 novel by Elizabeth Harrison (writer)
- On Call: Serbisyong Totoo. Ngayon., a Philippine public service TV program
- "On Call" (Casualty), a 2015 webisode of the BBC medical drama
- On Call: A Doctor's Journey in Public Service, the memoir of Anthony Fauci, which was released in 2024
- On Call (TV series), a 2025 American police procedural and serial drama television series

== See also ==
- On-call room, a room in a hospital for staff rest
- DART On-Call, a premium shuttle service by Dallas Area Rapid Transit
