= Jean Saunders =

British novelist (1932–2011)

Jean Innes Saunders
- Born: Jean Innes; 8 February 1932; London, England
- Died: 3 August 2011 (aged 79); Weston-super-Mare, Somerset, England, UK
- Occupation: Novelist
- Spouse: Geoff Saunders
- Children: 3
- Writing career
- Pen name: Jean Saunders, Jean Innes, Rowena Summers, Sally Blake, Jodi Nicol, Rachel Moore
- Period: 1974–2010
- Genres: romance, suspense
- Website: jeansaunders.net

Jean Saunders (née Innes; 8 February 1932 – 3 August 2011) was a British writer of romance novels from 1974 to 2010. She wrote under her married and maiden names, and also under the pseudonyms of Rowena Summers, Sally Blake, and Rachel Moore. She also wrote an erotic novel as Jodi Nicol and also published writing books.

Jean Saunders was the seventeenth chairman (1993–95) of the Romantic Novelists' Association, and she was the Vice-Chairman of Swanwick writers' summer school. She was a member of the Romance Writers of America, the Crime Writers' Association and the West Country Writers' Association.

== Biography ==
Jean Innes was born on 8 February 1932 in London, England, but she lived in the West Country almost all her life. She married Geoff Saunders, her childhood sweetheart, and they had three children.

After the publication of her first novel, Jean began a career as a magazine writer and published around 600 short stories. In the 1970s she started to publish gothic romance novels under her married and maiden name. In the 1980s she created two pseudonyms, Rowena Summers and Sally Blake, to write historical romances, her most popular works. In 1991 her novel The Bannister Girls was shortlisted for the Romantic Novel of Year award. In 2004, she began to use the pen name Rachel Moore.

She lived in Weston-Super-Mare, Somerset, where she wrote full-time.

She died on Wednesday 3 August 2011, after contracting an illness on a holiday earlier that year, after being rushed to Weston General Hospital.

== Bibliography ==
Some of her novels were reedited under different names.

=== As Jean Saunders ===
==== Single novels ====
- The Fugitives (1974)
- Only Yesterday (1975)
- Nightmare (1977)
- Roses All the Way (1978)
- The Kissing Time (1982)
- Love's Sweet Music (1983)
- Taste the Wine (1983)
- The Language of Love (1983)
- Partners in Love (1984)
- Scarlet Rebel (1984)
- Golden Destiny (1986)
- Lady of the Manor (1988)
- All in the April Morning (1990)
- The Bannister Girls (1990)
- Secret Touch (1992)
- To Love and Honour (1992)
- With This Ring (1993)
- How to Write Realistic Dialogue (1994)
- The Whispering Dark (1995)
- Wives, Friends and Lovers (1996)
- A Gambling Man (1997)
- Journey's End (1997)
- A Different Kind of Love (1998)
- Rainbow's End (2000)
- Unforgettable (2003)
- A Perfect Marriage (2004)
- Village Fate (2011)

==== Alexandra Best series ====
- Thicker Than Water (2000)
- Illusions (2000)
- Deadly Suspicions (2003)

==== Non fiction ====
- The Craft of Writing Romance (1986)
- Writing Step By Step (1988)
- How to Create Fictional Characters (1992)
- How to Research Your Novel (1993)
- How to Plot Your Novel (2000)
- Successful Novel Plotting (2009)
- Writing Dialogue (2011)
- Creating Fictional Characters (2011)
- Writing Romantic Fiction (2011)

=== As Jean Innes ===
==== Single novels ====
- Ashton's Folly (1975)
- Sands of Lamanna (1975)
- Golden God (1975)
- Whispering Dark (1976)
- White Blooms of Yarrow (1976)
- The Wishing Stone (1976)
- Boskelly's Bride (1976)
- Dark Stranger (1979)
- Silver Lady (1981)
- Scent of Jamine (1982)
- Legacy of Love (1982)
- Seeker of Dreams (1983)
- Cobden's Cottage (1985)
- Enchanted Island (1987)
- Buccaneer's Bride (1989)
- Dream Lover (1991)
- Golden Captive (1991)
- Secret Touch (1992)
- Tropical Fire (1992)
- Love's Fortune (1995)
- Beloved (1997)
- Jewel (1998)

==== Omnibus in collaboration ====
"A Reluctant Bride" in A Bride's Desire (1994) (with Karen A. Bale, Christine Dorsey and Sonya T. Pelton)

=== As Rowena Summers ===
==== Cornish Clay Saga ====
0. A Safe Haven (1996)
1. Killigrew Clay (1987)
2. Clay Country (1987)
3. Family Ties (1988)
4. Family Shadows (1995)
5. Primmy's Daughter (1998)
6. White Rivers (1999)
7. September Morning (1999)
8. A Brighter Tomorrow (2000)

- Rowena Summers Omnibus (White Rivers / September Morning) (2000)

==== Caldwell Saga ====
1. Taking Heart (2000)
2. Daisy's War (2001)
3. The Caldwell Girls (2002)
4. Dreams of Peace (2002)

==== Elkins Saga ====
1. Shelter from the Storm (2005)
2. Monday's Child (2005)

==== Chase Saga ====
1. Long Shadows (2007)
2. Distant Horizons (2008)

==== O'Neil Saga ====
1. Chasing Rainbows (2009)
2. Pot of Gold (2009)

==== Single novels ====
- Blackmaddie (1980)
- The Savage Moon (1982)
- The Sweet Red Earth (1983)
- Willow Harvest (1984)
- Highland Heritage (1991)
- Velvet Dawn (1991)
- Angel of the Evening (1992)
- Ellie's Island (1993)
- Hidden Currents (1994)
- Bargain Bride (1994)
- A Woman of Property (1994)
- This Girl (2005)
- Blackthorn Cottage (2006)

=== As Sally Blake ===
==== Single novels ====
- The Devil's Kiss (1981)
- Moonlight Mirage (1982)
- Outback Woman (1989)
- Lady of Spain (1990)
- Far Distant Shores (1991)
- Royal Summer (1992)
- House of Secrets (1994)
- Marrying for Love (1997)
- A Gentleman's Masquerade (1999)

=== As Jodi Nicol ===
==== Single novels ====
- Silken Chains (2003)

=== As Rachel Moore ===
==== Cornish Clay Saga ====
9. The Soldier's Wife (2004)
10. The Farmer's Wife (2005)
11. A Cornish Maid (2006)

==== Single novels ====
- Prodigal Daughter (2007)
- Days to Remember (2008)
- Summer of Love (2010)
