= Netta Muskett =

British novelist

Netta Rachel Hill Muskett
- Born: Netta Rachel Hill; 1887; Sevenoaks, Kent, England
- Died: 29 May 1963 (aged 75–76); Putney, England
- Occupation: novelist
- Spouse: Henry Wallace Muskett
- Children: 1 son 3 stepchildren
- Writing career
- Pen name: Netta Muskett, Anne Hill
- Language: English
- Period: 1927–1963
- Genre: Romance

Netta Muskett (1887 in Sevenoaks, Kent, England – 29 May 1963 in Putney) was a British writer of more than 60 romance novels from 1927 to 1963, who also wrote under the pseudonym Anne Hill. Her novels have been translated to several languages, including: Spanish, French, Portuguese, Finnish, Swedish and Danish.

Netta Muskett was co-founder and vice-president of the Romantic Novelists' Association, that created in her honour the Netta Muskett Award for new writers, now called the RNA New Writers Scheme.

== Biography ==
=== Personal life ===
Netta Rachel Hill was born on 1887 in Sevenoaks, Kent, England, UK. She was educated at Kent College, Folkestone, before became teacher of Mathematics.

During the World War I, she joined the Voluntary Aid Detachment, and drove an ambulance in France. In 1916, her brother, member of the Imperial Camel Corp, was killed in Egypt.

After the war, she worked as secretary of Lord George Riddell, 1st Baron Riddell, owner and Managing Director of the News of the World. In 1925, she married the widower Henry Wallace Muskett (1886–1953), who had three children from his first marriage, and they had a son, Peter Muskett, who married Judith; they had two children: Sarah-Jane and Jamie.

During the World War II, she again served with the V.A.D where she taught handicrafts in British and American hospitals.

She died on 29 May 1963 in Putney.

=== Writing career ===
She started publishing on 1927, and she continued writing until the day of her death, and her last novel, Cloudbreak, was published posthumously. In 2013, to celebrate the 50th anniversary of her death, her family started to published her novels as e-books through Amazon Kindle.

== Bibliography ==
=== As Netta Muskett ===
==== Novels ====
- The Jade Spider (1927)
- The Flickering Lamp (1930)
- The Open Window (1930)
- A Mirror for Dreams (1931)
- After Rain (1931)
- Nor Any Dawn (1932)
- The Shallow Cup (1932)
- Plaster Cast (1933)
- Wings in the Dust (1933)
- Painted Heaven (1934)
- Silver-Gilt (1935)
- Tamarisk (1935)
- Winter's Day (1936)
- Alley-Cat (1937)
- Middle Mist (1937)
- The Shadow Market (1938)
- Blue Haze (1939)
- Today is Ours (1939)
- Scarlet Heels (1940)
- The Wire Blind (1940)
- Wide and Dark (1940)
- The Gilded Hoop (1941)
- Love in Amber (1942)
- Candle in the Sun (1943)
- Golden Harvest (1944)
- Fire of Spring (1946)
- Misadventure (1946)
- The Patchwork Quilt (1946)
- The Clency Tradition (1947)
- A Daughter for Julia (1948)
- The Durrants (1948)
- Living with Adam (1949)
- Cast the Spear (1950)
- House of Many Windows (1950)
- No May in October (1951)
- The Long Road (1951)
- Rock Pine (1952)
- Safari for Seven (1952)
- Brocade (1953) aka Not the Marrying Kind
- Philippa (1954)
- Red Dust (1954)
- Give Back Yesterday (1955)
- Flowers from the Rock (1956)
- Light From One Star (1956)
- The Crown of Willow (1957)
- Flame of the Forest (1958)
- The Fettered Past (1958)
- The High Fence (1959)
- Through Many Waters (1961)
- The Touchstone (1962)
- The Weir House (1962)
- Love and Deborah (1963)
- Cloudbreak (1964)
- Daughter for John

=== As Anne Hill ===
==== Novels ====
- The White Dove (1956)
- This lovely thing (1957)
- No yesterdays (1959)
- Safe harbour (1960)
- Jennifer (1961)
- House of straw (1962)
- The other woman (1963)
