= Romantic Novelists' Association =

British professional association

The Romantic Novelists' Association (RNA) is the professional body representing authors of romantic fiction in the United Kingdom. It was founded in 1960 by Denise Robins (first president), Barbara Cartland (first vice-president), Vivian Stuart (first elected chairman), and other authors including Elizabeth Goudge, Netta Muskett, Catherine Cookson, Rosamunde Pilcher and Lucilla Andrews.

The RNA has a membership approaching 1000, composed of authors and publishing professionals. It promotes and celebrates romantic fiction across all sub-genres. It holds events, including an annual conference and workshops/seminars on aspects of writing craft and the publishing industry. The organisation has regional chapters, which meet regularly to discuss issues of concern to writers of romantic fiction. The RNA runs the New Writers' Scheme, under which unpublished authors receive an appraisal of their work from an experienced member of the Association. Netta Muskett was co-founder and vice-president of the association and the Netta Muskett Award for new writers, now called the RNA New Writers Scheme, was created in her honour.

== Awards ==
The RNA recognises excellence in romantic fiction through their annual Romantic Novel of the Year Awards. The Romantic Novel of the Year Awards cover several categories, including fantasy, contemporary and saga, and are judged by readers. Once a year, the RNA also awards a debut authors' prize, sponsored by Dr. David Hessayon. The RNA also holds annual industry awards, recognising individuals and or companies who have promoted the genre of romantic fiction.

== Staff ==
=== Board of Directors ===
Since 2021, the chair of the board has been Jean Fullerton.

Current Directors (alphabetical):

- Andrea Davies
- Jean Fullerton
- Katie Ginger
- Annette Hannah
- Sharon Ibbotson
- Sue Merritt
- Seana Talbot
- Maria Wilson

=== Presidents ===
- 2023-present: Sue Moorcroft
- 2011–2023: Catherine Rose Gordon-Cumming Fforde (Katie Fforde)
- 1986–2011: Diane Margaret Pearson McClelland (Diane Pearson)
- 1966–1986: Ida Cook (Mary Burchell)
- 1960–1966: Denise Naomi Klein Robins Pearson (Denise Chesterton, Denise Robins, Hervey Hamilton, Francesca Wright, Ashley French, Harriet Gray, Julia Kane)

=== Vice-Presidents ===
Former Vice-Presidents

- Elizabeth Margaret Stevens O'Rourke (Betty O'Rourke)
- Tilly Armstrong (Tania Langley, Kate Alexander)
- Sheila O'Nions Walsh (Sheila Walsh, Sophie Leyton)
- Hilda Pressley Nickson (Hilda Nickson, Hilda Pressley, Hilary Preston)
- Noreen Ford Dilcock (Norrey Ford, Jill Christian, Christian Walford)
- Elizabeth de Beauchamp Goudge (Elizabeth Goudge)
- Evadne Price (Helen Zenna Smith )
- Netta Rachel Muskett (Netta Muskett, Anne Hill)
- Dame Mary Barbara Hamilton Cartland (Barbara Cartland)
- Dorothy Delius Black MacLeish (Dorothy Black)

Honorary Vice-Presidents

- Ida Crowe Pollock (Joan M. Allen, Susan Barrie, Pamela Kent, Averil Ives, Anita Charles, Barbara Rowan, Jane Beaufort, Rose Burghley, Mary Whistler, Ida Pollock, Marguerite Bell)

Associate Vice-Presidents

- Rosemary de Courcey
- Linda Evans
- Sue Fletcher
- John Hale
- Michael Legat
- Judy Piatkus
- Karin Stoecker
- Jane Wood

=== Committee ===
==== Committee Chair ====
- 2021 – present: Jean Fullerton (chair)
- 2019–2021: Alison May
- 2017–2019: Nicola Cornick
- 2015–2017: Eileen Ainsworth Ramsay (Eileen Ramsay)
- 2013–2015: Pia Tapper Fenton (Christina Courtenay)
- 2011–2013: Anne Ashurst, née Bushell (Sara Craven)
- 2009–2011: Catherine Rose Gordon-Cumming Fforde (Katie Fforde)
- 2007–2009: Catherine Jones (Kate Lace, Annie Jones)
- 2005–2007: Jenny Haddon (Sophie Weston)
- 2003–2005: Anthea Kenyon
- 2001–2003: Jean Chapman
- 1999–2001: Norma Curtis
- 1997–1999: Angela Arney
- 1995–1997: Elizabeth Mary Oakleigh-Walker Buchan (Elizabeth Buchan)
- 1993–1995: Jean Innes Saunders (Jean Saunders, Jean Innes, Rowena Summers, Sally Blake, Jodi Nicol, Rachel Moore)
- 1991–1993: Marina Oliver (Sally James, Donna Hunt, Bridget Thorn, Vesta Hathaway, Livvy West, Laura Hart)
- 1989–1991: Margaret Pemberton (Maggie Hudson, Carris Carlisle, Christina Harland, Rebecca Dean)
- 1987–1989: Tilly Armstrong (Tania Langley, Kate Alexander)
- 1985–1987: Sheila O'Nions Walsh (Sheila Walsh, Sophie Leyton)
- 1983–1985: Diana Morgan
- 1981–1983: Contance Fecher Heaven (Constance Fecher, Constance Heaven, Christina Merlin)
- 1979–1981: Clare Cavendish
- 1977–1979: Elizabeth Fancourt Harrison (Elizabeth Harrison)
- 1975–1977: Nancy Jean Buckingham Sawyer (Nancy Buckingham, Christina Abbey, Erica Quest, Nancy John, Hilary London)
- 1973–1975: Leila Antionette Sterling Mackinlay (Leila Mackinlay, Brenda Grey)
- 1971–1973: Alice Mary Chetwynd Humphrey Ley (Alice Chetwynd Ley)
- 1969–1971: Lois Dorothea Low (Dorothy Mackie Low, Lois Paxton, Zoë Cass)
- 1967–1969: Marjorie Bell Marshall (Stella March)
- 1965–1967: June Sylvia Thimblethorpe (Sylvia Thorpe)
- 1963–1965: Noreen Ford Dilcock (Norrey Ford, Jill Christian, Christian Walford)
- 1961–1963: Violet Vivian Finlay Stuart Mann (Vivian Stuart, Alex Stuart, Barbara Allen, Fiona Finlay, V.A. Stuart, William Stuart Long, Robyn Stuart)

=== Honor Life members ===
- Sarah Broadhurst
- Edwin Buckhalter
- David G. Hessayon (Dr. D.G. Hessayon)
- Caroline Sheldon
- June Sylvia Thimblethorpe (Sylvia Thorpe)
