= The Report of the Investigation Commission of Althing =

2010 Icelandic government report on the 2008 financial crisis

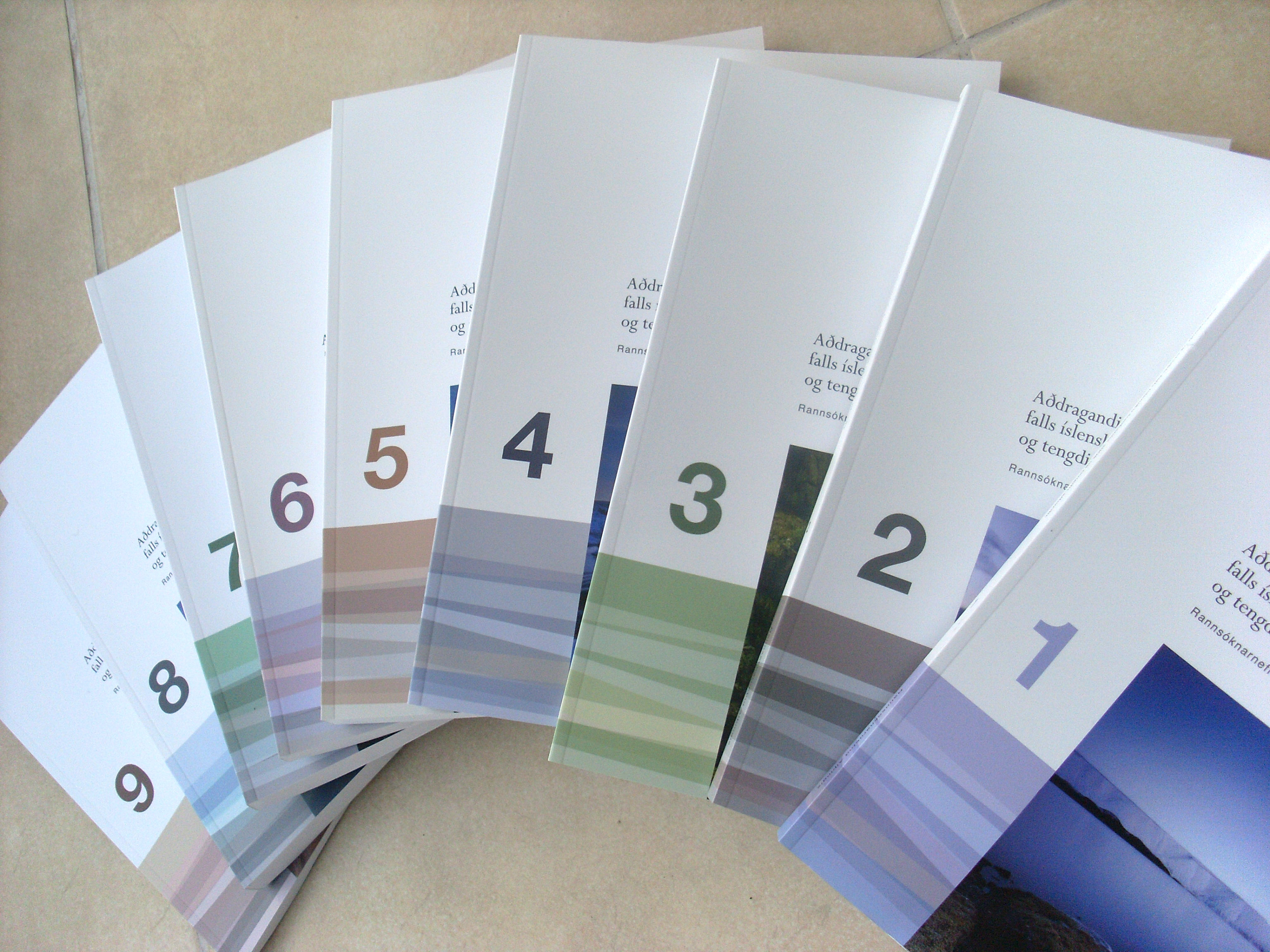
- Covers of the report
- Author: Investigation Commission of Althing
- Language: Icelandic
- Subject: 2008–2011 Icelandic financial crisis
- Published: April 12, 2010
- Media type: Government report

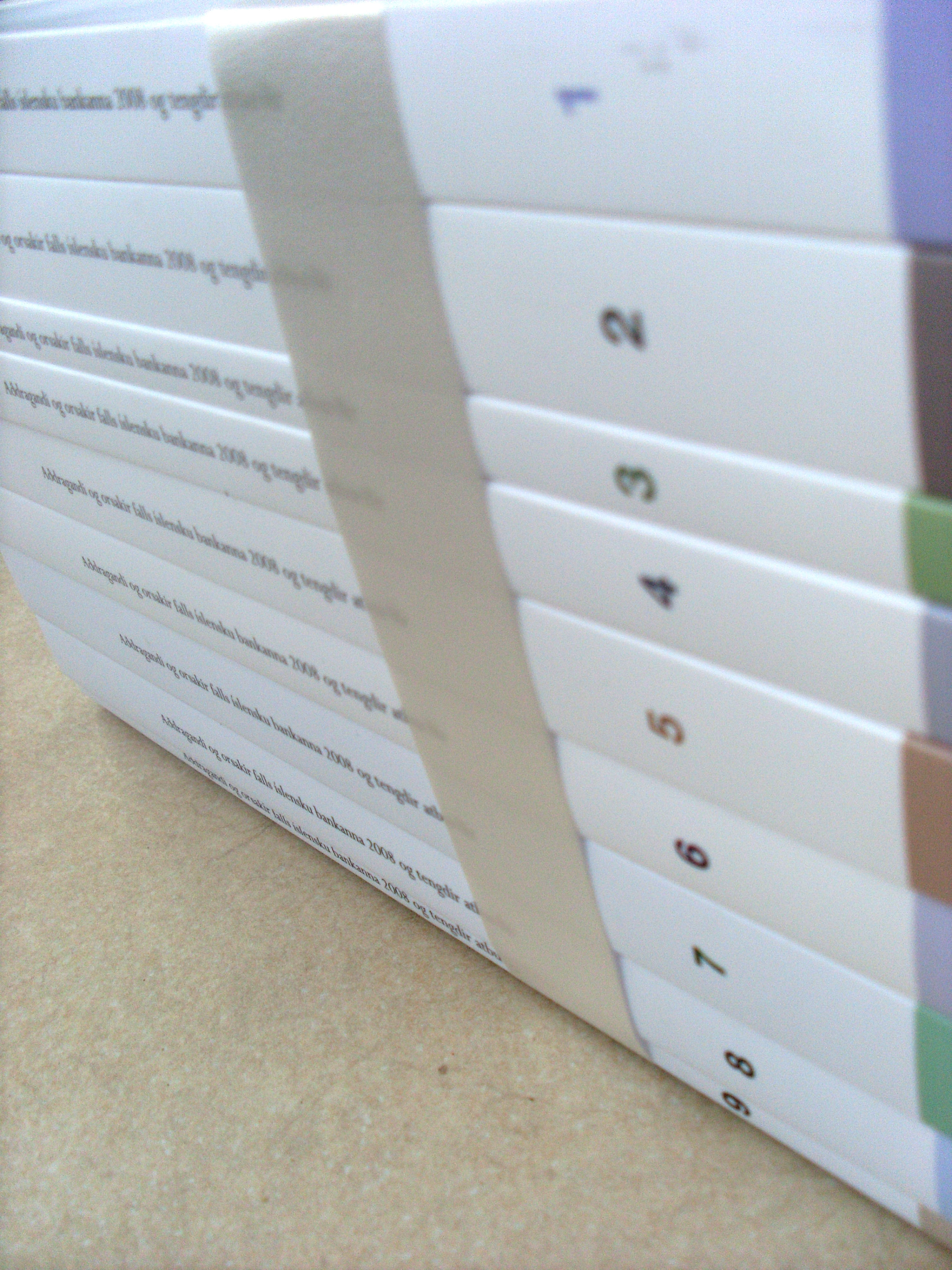
Spines of the report.

Antecedents and Causes of the Collapse of the Icelandic Banks in 2008 and Related Events (Icelandic: Aðdragandi og orsakir falls íslensku bankanna 2008 og tengdir atburðir), better known as The Report of the Investigation Commission of Althing (Icelandic: Skýrsla rannsóknarnefndar Alþingis, or just Rannsóknarskýrsla Alþingis), and earlier referred to as a 'White Book' (Hvíta bók), is a report covering the background and the crash of the Icelandic banking system in 2008.

== Investigation ==
Following the collapse of the Icelandic banking system, Prime Minister Geir Haarde began referring to "a white book" intended to reveal the truth about the operations of the fallen banks' on December 11, 2012. On December 12, 2008, by legal act 142/2008, the Icelandic parliament established an investigation commission to, in the words of the law, 'seek the truth behind the events leading to, and the causes of, the downfall of the Icelandic banks in October 2008, and related events', 'granting the Commission 'exceptional investigative powers in order to appease the demonstrators and to meet the public's demand for answers as to why their three largest banks, Glitnir, Landsbanki, and Kaupthing, had collapsed'. As well as arising from popular pressure, the law was passed 'under the leadership of the speaker of the parliament, Sturla Bodvarsson, and pressure from opposition leaders such as Steingrimur J. Sigfusson'.

On December 30, the three members of the commission were appointed, being people 'with impeccable reputation': Supreme Court Justice Páll Hreinsson, who served as chairman; the Parliamentary Ombudsman Tryggvi Gunnarsson; and Sigríður Benediktsdóttir, associate chair in Economics at Yale University. Although driven by popular protest, the establishment of the SIC was not enough to placate the protesters, and the government fell in the so-called 'Kitchenware Revolution'. The commission hired 48 employees or contractors, with five teams, including legal, auditors, ethics, and quantitative analysis teams; some foreign analysts were hired, including Mark Flannery of the University of Florida and Eric Talley of the University of California, Berkeley.

The commission released its report on April 12, 2010 and then held a press conference at 10:30 UTC. The report was made available to the public both in print and online and a summary with excerpts from the report was also published online in English. Despite the deep penetration of Icelandic institutions by people personally connected with the deregulation of Iceland's banks and the associated banking boom, 'fortunately, and perhaps amazingly [...], there was little evidence in the final report [...] of a whitewash. The report turned out to be a detailed description of failure, incompetence, and mishandling, often with shocking direct quotes from SIC interrogations of major government figures or business leaders'.

== Artistic responses ==
The report was performed in a non-stop, 146-hour reading by the Reykjavík City Theatre from April 12–18, 2010.

The report was turned into a 'computerized textual mash-up ... resulting in a 65 page long poem' called Gengismunur ("Arbitrage") by Jón Örn Loðmfjörð; in the assessment of Eiríkur Örn Norðdahl, the poem 'deals with and represents the banality (and hilarity) of the language surrounding the crisis, the politics and the market'. It has also been seen by Norðdahl to have inspired Sindri Freysson's Ljóðveldið Ísland: 65 ár í 66 erindum við þig.

Its earlier, informal name gave the title to Einar Már Guðmundsson's 2009 Hvíta bókin.
