= Michael Legat =

- Born: 24 March 1923; London, England, United Kingdom
- Died: 15 August 2011 (aged 88); Sussex, England, United Kingdom
- Occupations: publisher, novelist
- Writing career
- Pen name: Michael Legat
- Language: English
- Period: 1972–2004
- Genre: Romance
- Website: www.bookends.clara.net

Michael Legat (24 March 1923 – 15 August 2011) was a British writer of writers' guides and romance novels. He was Chairman of Swanwick writers' summer school and an associate vice-president of the Romantic Novelists' Association.

Legat was born in London, England. He worked as Editorial Director of Corgi Books and later of Cassell during 35 years, in 1978 he decided to turn to writing full-time. He died in Sussex, aged 88.

== Bibliography ==
=== Harcourt Saga ===
1. The Silk Maker (1985)
2. The Cast Iron Man (1987)

=== Novels ===
- Mario's Vineyard (1980)
- The Silver Fountain (1982)
- The Shapiro Diamond (1984)
- We Beheld His Glory (1988)
- The Retiring Highwayman (1998)
- Two's a Crowd (2001)
- The Prison Within (2001)
- The Pure in Heart (2001)

=== Non Fiction ===
- Dear Author: Letters from a Working Publisher to Authors, Prospective and Practiced (1972)
- An Author's Guide to Publishing (1982)
- Putting on a Play (1984)
- Writing for Pleasure and Profit (1986)
- The Illustrated Dictionary of Western Literature (1987)
- The Nuts and Bolts of Writing (1989)
- How to Write Historical Novels (1990)
- Plotting the Novel (1992)
- Understanding Publishers' Contracts (1992)
- Non-fiction Books: A Writer's Guide (1993)
- The Writer's Rights (1995)
- An Author's Guide to Literary Agents (1995)
- Revision: An Author's Guide (1998)
- Michael Legat Writer's Guides (1999)
- Writing Your Life Story (1999)
- Rehearsal (1999)
- They Read Books and Go to Cocktail Parties (2000)
- Writing for a Living (2000)
- The Ultimate Simple Writer's Guide (2004)
