= Leila Mackinlay =

Leila Antoinette Sterling Mackinlay
- Born: Leila Antoinette Sterling Mackinlay; 5 September 1910; London, England
- Died: 13 April 1996 (aged 85); Camden Town, London, England
- Occupation: Novelist
- Relatives: Malcolm Sterling Mackinlay (father); Antoinette Sterling (grandmother)
- Writing career
- Pen name: Leila Mackinlay, Leila S. Mackinlay, Brenda Grey
- Period: 1930–1979
- Genre: romance

Leila Antoinette Sterling Mackinlay (5 September 1910 – 13 April 1996) was a British writer of romance novels from 1930 to 1979 as Leila S. Mackinlay or Leila Mackinlay and also under the pseudonym Brenda Grey. Some of her novels are based on real people like Madame Vestris, Lola Montez or Jane Elizabeth Digby; she also wrote Musical Productions, a musical book. She was the daughter of the musician and writer Malcolm Sterling Mackinlay and granddaughter of the vocalist Antoinette Sterling.

She was the seventh elected chairman (1973–1975) of the Romantic Novelists' Association.

== Biography ==
Born Leila Antoinette Sterling Mackinlay on 5 September 1910 in London, England, she was the daughter of the musician and writer Malcolm Sterling Mackinlay, also known only as Sterling Mackinlay (1876–1952), and granddaughter of the popular vocalist Antoinette Sterling (1850–1904). She attended Camden School before obtained a diploma in English Literature at London University in 1950. She also was trained as a singer and actress. She worked as teacher of Ordinary Level English Literature.

As Leila S. Mackinlay and later Leila Mackinlay, she wrote romance novels from 1930 to 1979, she also used the pseudonym of Brenda Grey. Some of her novels are based in real people like, Madame Vestris, Lola Montez or Jane Elizabeth Digby, she also wrote Musical Productions, a musical book.

Elected the seventh chairman (1973–1975) of the Romantic Novelists' Association, she died on 13 April 1996 in Camden Town.

== Bibliography ==
=== As Leila S. Mackinlay or Leila Mackinlay ===
==== Novels ====
- Little Mountebank (1930)
- Madame Juno (1931)
- An Exotic Young Lady (1932)
- Willed to Wed (1933)
- The Pro's Daughter (1934)
- Shadow Lawn (1934)
- Into the Net (1935)
- Love Goes South (1935)
- Night Bell (1936)
- Apron-Strings (1937)
- Doubting Heart (1937)
- Caretaker Within (1938)
- Theme Song (1938)
- Only her Husband (1939)
- The Reluctant Bride (1939)
- Man Always Pays (1940)
- Woman at the Wheel (1940)
- None Better Loved (1941)
- The Brave Live On (1942)
- Time On Her Hands (1942)
- Green Limelight (1943)
- Lady of the Torch (1944)
- Two Walk Together (1945)
- Piccadilly Inn (1946)
- Blue Shutters (1947)
- Peacock Hill (1948)
- Echo of Applause (1948)
- Pilot's Point (1949)
- Restless Dream (1949)
- Six Wax Candles (1950)
- Spider Dance (1950)
- Guilt's Pavilions (1951)
- Unwise Wanderer (1951)
- Five Houses (1952)
- Cuckoo Cottage (1953)
- She Married Another (1953)
- Midnight Is Mine (1954)
- Fiddler's Green (1954)
- Riddle of a Lady (1955)
- Vagabond Daughter (1955)
- She Moved to Music (1956)
- Man of the Moment (1956)
- Divided Duty (1957)
- Mantle of Innocence (1957)
- Love On a Shoestring (1958)
- The Secret in Her Life (1958)
- Seven Red Roses (1959)
- Uneasy Conquest (1959)
- Spotlight on Susan (1960)
- Spring Rainbow (1961)
- Beauty's Tears (1961)
- Vain Delights (1962)
- Broken Armour (1963)
- False Relations (1963)
- Practice for Sale (1964)
- Fool of Virtue (1964)
- Ring of Hope (1965)
- No Room for Loneliness (1965)
- Outside Chance (1966)
- The Third Boat (1967)
- Mists of the Moor (1967)
- Wanted – Girl Friday (1968)
- Homesick for a Dream (1968)
- Frost At Dawn (1968)
- Farewell to Sadness (1970)
- Silken Purse (1970)
- Bridal Wreath (1971)
- Strange Involvement (1972)
- Food for Love (1973)
- Birds of Silence (1974)
- Fortune's Slave (1975)
- Twilight Moment (1976)
- Uphill Path (1979)

==== Non fiction ====
- Musical Productions (1955)
- Food of Love (1960)

=== Brenda Grey ===
==== Novels ====
- Modern Micawbers (1933)
- Stardust in Her Eyes (1964)
- Girl of His Choice (1965)
- How High the Moon (1966)
- Throw Your Bouquet (1967)
- A Very Special Person (1967)
- Shadow of a Smile (1968)
- Son of Summer (1970)
- Tread Softly on Dreams (1970)
- Mixed Singles (1971)
- Husband in Name (1972)
