= Betty O'Rourke =

English novelist

Elizabeth Margaret O'Rourke
- Born: Elizabeth Margaret Luther Smith; 12 May 1930; Enfield, North London, England, United Kingdom
- Died: 2006 (aged 75–76); Reading, Berkshire, England, United Kingdom
- Occupation: Novelist
- Spouse: Mr. O'Rourke
- Children: 4
- Writing career
- Pen name: Betty O'Rourke, Elizabeth Stevens, William Newham
- Language: English
- Period: 1987-2005
- Genre: Romance

Betty O'Rourke (born 12 May 1930 in Enfield, North London, England - died 2006 in Reading, Berkshire, England) was a British writer of over 14 romance novels from 1987 to 2005, she also wrote under the pseudonyms Elizabeth Stevens and William Newham. She was vice-president of the Romantic Novelists' Association and she was the acting Membership Secretary of the RNA.

== Biography ==
Elizabeth Margaret was born on 12 May 1930 in Reading, Berkshire, England. She started to work in a library at 20, and met her future husband at Library School, and worked as a librarian. During her first two years of marriage, they lived in the United States. They had four children. She lived in her native Reading until her death.

== Bibliography ==
=== As Betty O'Rourke ===
==== Single novels ====
- Pageantry of Love (1987)
- Mists of Remembrance (1989)
- Island of the Gods (1996)
- Nightingale Summer (1997)
- The Icon of the Czar (1998)
- Penhaligon's Rock (2000)
- Copper Rose (2000)
- The Eagle and the Rose (2002)
- The Pageant Master (2003)
- After Michael (2005)

=== As Elizabeth Stevens ===
==== Single novels ====
- Forbidden Love (1996)
- A Company Affair (1997)
- The Unwelcome Guest (2003)
- Hetty's Highwayman (2005)
