= Jean Chapman =

British novelist (1929–2026)

- Born: Jean Clowes; 30 October 1929; Blaby, Leicestershire, England
- Died: 18 August 2026 (aged 96); Blaby, Leicestershire, England
- Occupation: Novelist
- Spouse: Lionel Alan Chapman (m. 1951, died 2008)
- Children: 3
- Writing career
- Pen name: Jean Chapman
- Period: 1981–2026
- Genre: romance

Jean Chapman (née Clowes; 30 October 1929 – 18 August 2026) was a British writer of romance novels from 1981 and a lecturer in creative writing. Her debut novel The Unreasoning Earth and The Red Pavilion were both shortlisted for the Parker Pen Romantic Novel of the Year Award. She was elected the Chairman (2001–2003) of the Romantic Novelists' Association and was a three-time President of the Leicester Writer's Club.

== Background ==
Jean Clowes was born in Blaby, Leicestershire on 30 October 1929. In 1951, she married Lionel Alan Chapman (1930–2008) in Leicester; they had one son and two daughters. In 1989, she obtained a BA at Open University. She died in Blaby on 18 August 2026, aged 96.

== Bibliography ==
=== Single novels ===
- The Unreasoning Earth (1981)
- Tangled Dynasty (1984)
- The Forbidden Path (1986)
- Savage Legacy (1987)
- The Bellmakers (1991)
- Fortune's Woman (1991)
- A World Apart (1993)
- The Red Pavilion (1995)
- The Soldier's Girl (1997)
- This Time Last Year (1999)
- A New Beginning (2001)
- By Touch Alone (2015)

=== Philipps-Sinclair Saga ===
1. And a Golden Pear (2002)
2. Danced Over the Sea (2004)

=== John Cannon Series ===
1. Both Sides of the Fence (2009)
2. A Watery Grave (2011)
3. Deadly Serious (2013)
4. Deadly Zeal (2015)
5. Deadly Odds (2018)

Source for bibliography:
