= Constance Heaven =

British writer

Constance Fecher Heaven
- Born: Christina Aimee Fecher; 6 August 1911; London, England, UK
- Died: 12 April 1995 (aged 83); Kingston Upon Thames, London, England
- Occupations: Actress, novelist
- Spouse: William Heaven (1939-1958)
- Writing career
- Pen name: Constance Fecher, Constance Heaven, Christina Merlin
- Period: 1963-1995
- Genre: romance

Constance Christina Aimee Heaven (née Fecher; 6 August 1911 – 12 April 1995) was a British writer of romance novels, under her maiden name, her married name and under the pseudonym Christina Merlin. In 1973, her novel The House Of Kuragin was the Winner of the Romantic Novel of the Year.

She was the eleventh elected Chairman (1981–1983) of the Romantic Novelists' Association.

== Biography ==
Born Constance Fecher on 6 August 1911 in Enfield, Middlesex, London, England, UK. She was educated at the Convent of Woodford Green, Essex since 1921 to 1928, when she joined to study at King's College London, where she obtained a Honours degree in English in 1931. In 1931, she also graduated at London College of Music.

On 5 November 1939, she married William Heaven, who died in 1958. She was an actress from 1939 to 1966.

Published since 1963, she started writing historical novels with young protagonists under her maiden name Constance Fecher. Since 1972, she signed her novels more romantic, under her married name, Constance Heaven. She also used the pseudonym of Christina Merlin. In 1973, her novel The House Of Kuragin was the Winner of Romantic Novel of the Year.

She was the eleventh elected Chairman (1981–1983) of the Romantic Novelists' Association. She died in 1995, and continued writing until her death.

== Bibliography ==
Some of her novels were reedited under different pen names of titles.

=== As Constance Fecher ===
==== Single novels ====
- The Leopard Dagger (1963)
- The Link Boys (1967) aka Tom Hawke
- Player Queen (1968) aka The Lovely Wanton
- Venture for a Crown (1968)
- Lion of Trevarrock (1969)
- Heir to Pendarrow (1969)
- The Night of the Wolf (1972)
- By the Light of the Moon (1985)

==== Tudor Trilogy ====
1. Queen's Delight (1966) aka The Queen's favorite
2. Traitor's Son (1967)
3. King's legacy (1967)

==== Non fiction ====
- Bright Star: A Portrait of Ellen Terry (1970)
- The Last Elizabethan: A Portrait of Sir Walter Raleigh (1972)

=== As Constance Heaven ===
==== Kuragin Saga ====
1. The House of Kuragin (1972)
2. The Astrov Inheritance (1973) aka The Astrov Legacy
3. Heir to Kuragin (1978)

==== Ravensley Saga ====
1. Lord of Ravensley (1978)
2. The Ravensley Touch (1982)

==== Hunter's Love Series ====
1. Love's Shadow (1994)
2. The Love Child (1997)

==== Single novels ====
- Castle of Eagles (1974)
- The Place of Stones (1975)
- The Fires of Glenlochy (1976)
- The Queen and the Gypsy (1977)
- The Wildcliffe Bird (1981)
- Daughter of Marignac (1983)
- Castle of Doves (1984)
- Larksghyll (1986) aka The Craven Legacy
- The Raging Fire (1987)
- The Fire Still Burns (1989)
- The Wind from the Sea (1991)

=== As Christina Merlin ===
==== Novels ====
- Spy Concerts (1980)
- Sword of Mithras (1982)
