= Clare Cavendish =

British novelist

- Born: 19??
- Occupation: Novelist
- Writing career
- Pen name: Clare Cavendish
- Period: 1964-1982
- Genre: romance

Clare Cavendish was a British writer of romance novels from 1964 to 1982.

She was the tenth elected Chairman (1979–1981) of the Romantic Novelists' Association.

== Bibliography ==
=== Single novels ===
- Doctor in Trouble (1964)
- Doctor's Choice (1965)
- Hospital in Danger (1966)
- The Doctor Next Door (1967)
- Nurse in Hiding (1968)
- Ward Nine at St. Jude's (1969)
- Mind of a Doctor (1969)
- Doctor's Quest (1970)
- Hospital Summer (1971)
- Youngest Sister (1972)
- Nurse at the Crossroads (1974)
- A Doctor Must Dream (1974)
- Ship's Nurse (1975)
- Sister at Rivermead (1976)
- Doctor in Charge (1977)
- Staff Nurse at Nordale (1978)
- Doctor at Greyfriars (1979)
- Doctor's Family (1980)
- Nurse in the Highlands (1981)
- Village Nurse (1982)

=== Plays ===
- Christmas Visitor (1966)
