= Norma Curtis =

British novelist and short story writer

- Born: 15th August; Wales, United Kingdom
- Occupation: Novelist
- Spouse: Paul
- Children: 1
- Writing career
- Period: 1995-present
- Genres: Contemporary women's fiction, Romantic comedy, Historical fiction
- Website: www.normacurtis.com

Norma Curtis (b. Wales) is a British novelist and short story writer. Her debut novel, Living It Up, Living It Down was awarded the Romantic Novelists' Association New Writing Award in 1994, and later she was elected its twentieth Chairman (1999–2001). Her books have been translated into multiple languages, including German, French, Czech, Slovak and Russian.

== Biography ==
Norma Curtis was born in Wales, United Kingdom, but she now lives in London, England. She is married Paul, and they have a son, Joe.

== Bibliography ==
=== Novels ===
- Living It Up, Living It Down (1995)
- Quality Time (1996) (Reprinted as Striking a Balance 2015)
- The Last Place You Look (1998)
- Holy Bones and Ava Jones (2013)
- Striking a Balance (2015) (Reprint of Quality Time 1996)
- The Forgotten Guide to Happiness (2018) (Writing as Sophie Jenkins)
- A Random Act of Kindness (2019) (Writing as Sophie Jenkins)
- The Drowned Village (2022)
- The Hideaway (2022)
- The Coronation Party (2023)
- The Bridge Between Friends (Upcoming 2025)
