= Marina Oliver =

British writer of romance novels (born 1934)

- Born: 1934 (age 91–92)
- Occupation: Novelist
- Spouse: Chris
- Children: 4
- Writing career
- Pen name: Marina Oliver, Sally James, Donna Hunt, Bridget Thorn, Vesta Hathaway, Livvy West, Laura Hart
- Period: 1974-Present
- Genre: romance
- Website: www.marina-oliver.net

Marina Oliver (born 1934) is a British writer of romance novels. She has also written under the pseudonyms of Sally James, Donna Hunt, Bridget Thorn, Vesta Hathaway, Livvy West and Laura Hart. Marina also published writing books.

Oliver was elected the sixteenth Chairman (1992–1993) of the Romantic Novelists' Association, edited its Newsletter for 3 years, and now has been elected a Vice-President and runs the R.N.A. New Writer's Scheme.

== Biography ==
Oliver was born in 1934. She graduated from Keele University in Politics and Economics.

Oliver now splits her time between rural Shropshire and Madeira. Married to Chris, she has four grown-up children, Jackie, Debbie, Cindy and Simon, and seven grandchildren.

== Bibliography ==
=== As Marina Oliver ===
==== Lord Hugo ====
1. Lord Hugo's Bride (1980)
2. Lord Hugo's Wedding (1981)

==== Midlands at 20th century ====
1. The Cobweb Cage (1994)
2. The Glowing Hours (1995)
3. The Golden Road (1996)

==== Single novels ====
- Cavalier Courtship (1974)
- Restoration Affair (1975)
- A Civil Conflict (1975)
- Sibylla and the Privateer (1976)
- Courtesan of the Saints (1976)
- Campaign for a Bride (1977)
- Charms of a Witch (1977)
- Strife Beyond Tamar (1977)
- Gavotte (1978)
- Masquerade for the King (1978)
- Highland Destiny (1979)
- Player's Wench (1979)
- Runaway Hill (1981)
- Highwayman's Hazard (1983)
- Rebel Heart (1985)
- The Baron's Bride (1986)
- Veiled Destiny (1997)
- A Cut Above the Rest (2004)
- At the Earl's Command (2007)
- Courting Lord Dorney (2007)
- The Accidental Marriage (2008)
- A Disgraceful Affair (2008)
- Supervising Sally (2009)
- Scandal at the Dower House (2010)

==== Non fiction ====
- Starting to Write (1996)
- Writing Romantic Fiction (1997)
- A Century of Achievement (1997) A history of Queen Mary's High School Walsall
- Writing Historical Fiction (1998)
- Write and Sell Your Novel (2000)
- The Beginner's Guide to Writing a Novel (2006)
- Castles and Corvedale (2006)

=== As Sally James ===
A disgraceful affair

==== Single novels ====
- Miranda of the Island (1977)
- Mask of Fortune (1978)
- Golden Gypsy (1978)
- A Clandestine Affair (1980)
- Petronella's Waterloo (1980)
- Heir to Rowanlea (1980)
- Fortune at Stake (1981)
- Lord Fordington's Offer (1981)

=== As Donna Hunt ===
==== Single novels ====
- Forbidden Love (1981)

=== As Bridget Thorn ===
==== Single novels ====
- Fires in the Forest (1983)
- A Question of Love (1984)
- Hospital Heartbreaker (1988)
- Island Quest (2002)
- Her Stolen Heart (2003)
- Love's Sweet Secrets (2005)

=== As Vesta Hathaway ===
==== Single novels ====
- Honor and Passion (1992)

=== As Livvy West ===
==== Single novels ====
- Royal Courtship (1995)
- Her Captive Cavalier (2001)
- The Blazing Glen (2005)
- A Dangerous Love (2005)

=== As Laura Hart ===
==== Single novels ====
- Manhattan Magic (2000)
