= Margaret Pemberton =

British novelist (born 1943)

Margaret Hudson Pemberton
- Born: Margaret Hudson; 10 April 1943 (age 83); Bradford, Yorkshire, England, UK
- Occupation: Writer
- Spouse: Mike Pemberton
- Children: 5
- Writing career
- Pen name: Margaret Pemberton, Carris Carlisle, Christina Harland, Maggie Hudson, Rebecca Dean
- Period: 1975-present
- Genres: Romantic fiction, women's fiction
- Website: margaretpemberton.co.uk

Margaret Pemberton (née Hudson; born 10 April 1943) is a British writer of women's fiction since 1975. Beside her married name Margaret Pemberton, her writings have been published under her maiden name Maggie Hudson and the pseudonyms Carris Carlisle, Christina Harland, and Rebecca Dean.

A former chairman of the Romantic Novelists' Association (1989–91) she has written novels in many different genres; romantic suspense, historical sagas, contemporary sagas and crime. Having travelled extensively, her novels are set in many different parts of the world.

== Biography ==
Pemberton was born Margaret Hudson on 10 April 1943 in Bradford, Yorkshire, England, daughter of Kathleen (Ramsden), an artist, and George Arthur Hudson, an architect.

Married with Mike Pemberton, she has five adult children and lives in Whitstable, Kent, with her husband, and two small dogs.

Pemberton was the fifteenth Chairman of the Romantic Novelists' Association from 1989 to 1991 and also served on the Crime Writers' Association Committee.

== Published books ==
=== As Margaret Pemberton ===
Romantic suspense

- Rendezvous with Danger (1975) aka The Girl Who Knew Too Much
- Mystery of Saligo Bay (1976) aka The Last Letter
- The Guilty Secret (1979) aka A Dark Enchantment
- Tapestry of Fear (1979)
- Vengeance in the Sun (1980) aka The Villa d'Este

Historical romance

- Lion of Languedoc (1981)
- Pioneer Girl (1982) aka A Many-Splendoured Thing
- African Enchantment (1982)
- Flight to Verechenko (1983) aka A Rebellious Heart
- Devil's Palace (1983) aka The Reckless Miss Grainger
- Moonflower Madness (1993)
- Forget-me-Not Bride (1994)

Nightshades

- Forever (1982) aka Undying Love

Period sagas

- Silver Shadows, Golden Dreams (1985) aka Goddess
- Never Leave Me (1986) aka The Violins of Autumn
- A Multitude of Sins (1998) aka A Time to Remember
- White Christmas in Saigon (1990)
- An Embarrassment of Riches (1992)
- Zadruga (1994)
- The Londoners trilogy
1. The Londoners (1995)
2. Magnolia Square (1996)
3. Coronation Summer (1997)
- Yorkshire Rose (1997)
- Harlot (1998) aka The Far Morning
- Yorkshire Rose (1997)
- The Four of Us (2004)
- A Season of Secrets (2015)
- Beneath the Cypress Tree (2017)

=== As Carris Carlisle ===
- Party in Peking (1987) aka From China With Love

=== As Christina Harland ===
- Waiting Wives (1991)

=== As Maggie Hudson ===
Novels

- Tell Me No Secrets (1999)
- Fast Women (2000)
- Looking for Mr Big (2001)
- Nowhere to Run (2002)

=== As Rebecca Dean ===
Novels

- Enemies of the Heart (2008)
- Palace Circle (2009)
- The Golden Prince (2010)
- The Shadow Queen (2012) aka Wallis (2012)
