= Angela Arney =

British novelist

- Born: 19?? Hampshire, England, United Kingdom
- Occupation: Novelist
- Writing career
- Pen name: Angela Arney
- Period: 1984-present
- Genre: Romance

Angela Arney (b. Hampshire, England) was a British writer of romance novels since 1984. She was the nineteenth elected Chairman (1997–1999) of the Romantic Novelists' Association.

== Biography ==
Angela Arney was born and has lived for most of her life in Hampshire, England, and went to school in Winchester. However, since 2001, she lives in Marchwood, near Southampton. Angela has a son (who she wrote The Second Wife about), a daughter, and four grandchildren.

Angela has been a successful published writer of 16 short romantic suspense stories as well as 7 long romance novels since 1984. She was the nineteenth elected Chairman (1997–1999) of the Romantic Novelists' Association, the Plenary Speaker at the Winchester Writers' Conference in 1999, Writer in Residence for the week-long Kent Festival of Literature September 2000, a tutor at most of the annual Winchester Conferences for Writers, and also taught at Southampton University. She has also been a judge for "A Synopsis and First three pages of a novel" for the Sussex Writers' Conference, Is a reader for the New Writers Scheme (unpublished writers) and also reads partial manuscripts for a publisher. She is a speaker for various literary events up and down the country. Together with two other local authors, June Tate and Katie Fforde, she runs creative writing courses to tutor others.

As well as writing, Angela has interests in amateur theatre both as a performer and director for plays and musicals. Her old jobs has included shorthand writer, cabaret singer, teacher, hospital administrator and caterer. She has been a performer in musicals playing character parts with local societies at venues including the Mayflower Theatre. She has directed for large musicals with Southampton Musical Society and smaller productions for Phoenix Theatre Company.

== Bibliography ==
=== As Angela Arney ===
==== Single novels ====
- Cast the First Stone (1992)
- Light Me the Moon (1994)
- Secrets (1996)
- The Second Wife (1997)
- Leaves Before the Storm (2014)
- Old Sins, Long Memories (2014)
- The Dead Girl's Shoes (2017)
