= Jacques de la Faye =

French writer

Jacques de la Faye was a 17th and 18th century French writer whose Defensio Religionis ('"Defense of Religion'), a 251-page critique of the pantheism of John Toland, was published at Utrecht by G. Broedelet in 1709. De la Faye's was the first recorded use of the word "pantheism".
