= Tilly Armstrong =

British novelist (1927–2010)

- Born: 8 April 1927; Sutton, Surrey, England, United Kingdom
- Died: 6 July 2010 (aged 83); Carshalton, England, United Kingdom
- Occupation: Novelist
- Writing career
- Pen name: Tania Langley, Kate Alexander
- Period: 1978–1998
- Genre: romance

Tilly Armstrong (8 April 1927 – 6 July 2010) was a British writer of romance novels from 1978 to 1998. She also wrote as Tania Langley and Kate Alexander.

== Biography ==
Armstrong was born on 8 April 1927 in Sutton, Surrey.

She loved to write and used to make up stories to tell her siblings.

Before she began her writing career, she worked for the World Health Organization in Geneva, then in Canada for 18 months, and then became the personal secretary to the Chairman of British Steel, Lord Melchett.

She was the fourteenth elected Chairman (1987–1989) of the Romantic Novelists' Association, and was later one of its vice-presidents.

Armstrong was also the founding President of Sutton Writers and worked for Nonsuch.

She died aged 83, on 6 July 2010, at Carshalton, England, UK.

== Bibliography ==
Armstrong wrote under her own name and under two pseudonyms.

=== As Tilly Armstrong ===
- Lightly Like a Flower (1978)
- Come Live With Me (1979)
- Joy Runs High (1979)
- Limited Engagement (1980)
- Summer Tangle (1983)
- Small Town Girl (1984)
- Pretty Penny (1985)

=== As Tania Langley ===
- Dawn (1980)
- Mademoiselle Madeleine (1981)
- The London Linnet (1985)
- Genevra (1987)

=== As Kate Alexander ===
- Fields of Battle (1981)
- Friends and Enemies (1982)
- Paths of Peace (1984)
- Bright Tomorrows (1985)
- Songs of War (1987)
- Great Possessions (1989)
- The Shining Country (1991)
- The House of Hope (1992)
- Voices of Song (1994)
- The Anthology of Love and Romance (edited, 1994) (including stories by Rosamunde Pilcher, Georgette Heyer, Edith Wharton et al)
- Family Trees (1995)
- Love and Duty (1998)
