= Jeannie Lin =

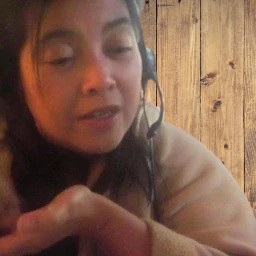
- Jeannie Lin in 2023
- Born: Simi Valley, California, U.S.
- Occupation: Writer
- Writing career
- Pen name: Liliana Lee, Phuong-Chi Nguyen
- Period: 2005-present
- Genre: Historical romance
- Notable work: Butterfly Swords
- Notable awards: Golden Heart Award for Historical Fiction
- Website: www.jeannielin.com

Jeannie Lin is an author of historical romance novels. Her debut novel, Butterfly Swords won the Golden Heart award for Historical fiction from the Romance Writers of America association.

== Early life ==
Before becoming a novelist, Lin was a high school teacher in South Central Los Angeles.

== Career ==
Lin's writing was influenced by her early love of Western epic fantasy, martial arts, and romance novels. Her historical romance novels, published with Harlequin, are set in Tang dynasty China, and have been praised for their historical accuracy and detail.

Lin won the Golden Heart award for Historical fiction from the Romance Writers of America in 2009, for her debut novel Butterfly Swords. The award recognises new, unpublished romance authors.

Lin's other novels include The Dragon and the Pearl, My Fair Concubine, and The Lotus Palace. Library Journal listed The Dragon and the Pearl as one of the best books published in 2011. In 2014 The Lotus Palace reached the USA Today Bestseller list. In 2013 it was announced that The Jade Temptress, the sequel to The Lotus Palace, would be published digitally only.

In 2014 Lin began writing the Gunpowder Chronicles, a series of novels in the steampunk genre, set during the Opium Wars of the 19th century. The first book in the series Gunpowder Alchemy was praised for its depiction of a strong and complex protagonist.
