= Jón Örn Loðmfjörð =

Icelandic experimental poet (born 1983)

Jón Örn Loðmfjörð (born 25 December 1983, Selfoss) is an Icelandic experimental poet. He is noted for computer-generated poetry, particularly his 2010 mash-up of the Icelandic government report into the collapse of Iceland's banks in 2008, Gengismunur ('Arbitrage').

== Works ==
- (with Eiríkur Örn Norðdahl) Brandarablandarar: https://web.archive.org/web/20110419131623/http://www.norddahl.org/brandarablandarar/
- (with Arngrímur Vídalín, under the pseudonym Celidonius) Síðasta ljóðabók Sjóns ([Reykjavík]: Nýhil, 2008); ISBN 9789979989622 (ób.); 9979989629
- (with Kristín Svava Tómasdóttir, under the pseudonym Dr. Usli) Usli: kennslubók, Smábókaflokkur Nýhils, 4 (Reykjavík: Nýhil, 2009); ISBN 9789979989684 (ób.); 9979989688
- Gengismunur: ljóð úr skýrslu rannsóknarnefndar alþingis (Reykjavík: Nýhil, 2010); http://lommi.is/gengismunur/

== Translations into English ==
- 'Five Poems', 3:AM Magazine (December 19, 2010), http://www.3ammagazine.com/3am/five-poems-jon-orn-lo%C3%B0mfor%C3%B0/
