= Jack Lindeman =

American poet

Jack Lindeman taught at Lincoln and Temple Universities and at Kutztown State College/Kutztown University, published poetry in the following other journals: the Southwest Review, the New York Times, The Nation, Poetry Magazine, Prairie Schooner, Epos: a Quarterly of Poetry, and Colorado Quarterly. His literary criticism appeared in The Literary Review, The Massachusetts Review, Rocky Mountain Review of Language and Literature, School and Society, and Modern Age. He wrote on William James and Herman Melville.

== Career ==
His more recent poetry appears in Commonweal, Argestes, Poetry Now, Compass Rose, Chiron Review, Blue Unicorn, Bellowing Ark, and CommonSense2, and he is included in the anthology From Both Sides Now, published by Scribner, 1998.

Lindeman edited the little magazine Whetstone: A Quarterly Review between 1955 and 1961 with Edgar H. Schuster, who authored American Literature: A Chronological Approach, Breaking the Rules: Liberating Writers through Innovative Grammar Instruction, and Our Common Language.

Lindeman's books include Twenty-One Poems (Pamplona [Spain]: Atlantis Editions, 1963); The Conflict of convictions(Philadelphia : Chilton 1968); Appleseed Hollow: A Chronicle of Caring (a diary of farm life in Pennsylvania)(Bloomington, Ind.: 1stBooks, 2002). His most recent book is As If by Finishing Line Press, 2005.

Jack Lindeman's nine-page 1959 article “The ‘Trench Poems’ of Isaac Rosenberg” in The Literary Review that cemented Rosenberg's poetry in the minds of many readers.

Lindeman's article was never republished, but it is referenced throughout the decades, excluding only the 1990s. In the 1950s and 1960s, it was listed in Little Magazines, Books Abroad, MLA International Bibliography, Abstracts of English Studies, Poetry Magazine, The Year’s Work in English Studies, and the Annual Bibliography of English Language and Literature. In the 1970s, it was listed in The Little Review, (in French by) Les Poetes-combattants anglais de la Grande guerre, Spirit Above Wars by Banerjee. In the 1980s, it was listed in The Transitional Age: British literature 1880–1920, Articles on Twentieth Century Literature and Gale's Twentieth-Century Literary Criticism. And, in 2000, it is listed in Gale's British poets of the Great War: Brooke, Rosenberg, Thomas: a documentary volume.
