= Alfred Lemm =

German expressionist narrator, pacifist and essayist

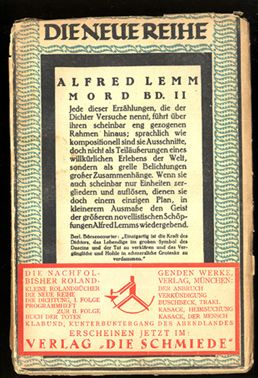
Mord (Murder). Volume 2. Munich, Roland Verlag, 1918. Residual copy taken over from the publisher Die Schmiede.

Max Alfred Lehmann (6 December 1889 – 16 October 1918), better known by his artist name Alred Lemm, was a German expressionist narrator, pacifist and essayist, who in many of his writings campaigned for a renewal of Judaism in Germany by turning to Eastern Judaism according to Martin Buber.

== Personal life ==
Alfred Lemm was married to Susanna (called Susi) Behr.

His widow was married in second marriage to the merchant Paul Zadek. They are the parents of the director and artistic director Peter Zadek.

== Works ==
- Galizisches Tagebuch, in: Zeit-Echo. Ein Kriegs-Tagebuch der Künstler 1914–1917, published by Otto Haas-Heye, January 1916.
- Aufzeichnungen eines Krankenträgers, Zeit-Echo, April 1916.
- Fahrt durch Polen, Frankfurter Zeitung, September 3, 1916 and in: Selbstwehr. Unabhängige jüdische Wochenschrift, September 15, 1916.
- Grossstadt Unkultur und die Juden in: Der Jude, August 1916.
- Von der Aufgabe der Juden in Europa in: Der Jude, 1917.
- Der fliehende Felician. Roman. Müller, Munich 1917.
- Vom Wesen der wahren Vaterlandsliebe. Series: Schriften gegen die Zeit, 3. Heinz Barger, Der Neue Geist Verlag, Berlin, 1917.
- Mord. Novellen, 2 Bände. Roland Verlag Albert Mundt, Munich 1918.
1. Erzählungen. Die Neue Reihe, 10
2. Versuche. Die Neue Reihe, 11
- Der Weg der Deutschjuden. Eine Skizzierung. Series: Der neue Geist, 13. Der Neue Geist Verlag, Leipzig, 1919.
- Beiträge in Das Forum. Herausgeber: Wilhelm Herzog. Jg. 1, April 1914 – March 1915 and in Zeit-Echo. Publisher: Otto Haas-Heye. Jg. 2, notebook 8, 1915–1916.
- Alfred Lemm: Weltflucht in: Fritz Martini (publisher): Prosa des Expressionismus, Reclam, Stuttgart, 1970, p. 245–263

== Literature ==
- Lemm, Alfred. In: Lexikon deutsch-jüdischer Autoren. Volume 15: Kura–Lewa. Published by Archiv Bibliographia Judaica. Saur, Munich 2007, ISBN 978-3-598-22695-3, p. 261–265.
- Hans J. Schütz: „Ein deutscher Dichter bin ich einst gewesen“. Vergessene und verkannte Autoren des 20. Jahrhunderts. C. H. Beck, Munich 1988
- Beata Mache: Zeit, zu wirken gegen die Gehässigkeit. Literatur und der Krieg: Alfred Lemm, Hugo Sonnenschein and Uriel Birnbaum, in Kalonymos, Jg. 17, H. 4, S. 4–7; Lemm p. 5f.
- Florian Sendtner
  - Alfred Lemm — Leben und Werk, Magister-Arbeit, University of Regensburg.
  - Kämpfer gegen den Tod. Der unbekannte expressionistische Schriftsteller Alfred Lemm – und eine allzu bekannte Debatte, DIE ZEIT, Nr. 12/1994, March 18, 1994.
  - Lemm, Alfred. In: Andreas B. Kilcher (Hrsg.): Metzler Lexikon der deutsch-jüdischen Literatur. Jüdische Autorinnen und Autoren deutscher Sprache von der Aufklärung bis zur Gegenwart. 2., Updated and expanded version. Metzler, Stuttgart/Weimar 2012, ISBN 978-3-476-02457-2, p. 331f.
- Roni Hirsh-Ratzkovsky: From Berlin to Ben Shemen: The Lehmann Brothers between Expressionism and Zionism, AJS Review, Volume 41, Issue 1, April 2017, pp. 37–65.
