= William Luvaas =

American author

William Luvaas is an American author and educator.

== Biography ==
In 1965, Luvaas was one of two AmeriCorps VISTA volunteers in Alabama, working with black sharecroppers and domestic workers in a government-funded program "designed to provide needed resources to nonprofit organizations and public agencies to increase their capacity to lift communities out of poverty."

Luvaas is a graduate of the University of California, Berkeley. He developed the first high school-level fiction writing course in New York. As fiction coordinator for New York State Poets in Public Service and New York State Poets in Schools, he was writer-in-residence for schools, hospitals and juvenile detention facilities.

In 2006, he received the National Endowment for the Arts fellowship for prose, awarded while he was teaching at San Diego State University.

His short story collection Ashes Rain Down: A Story Cycle (Spuyten Duyvil) was awarded 2013 Book of the Year by HuffPost and was a finalist for the Next Generation Indie Book Awards.

== Publications ==
=== Novels ===
- Ashes Rain Down
- The Seductions of Natalie Bach (Little, Brown)
- Going Under (Putnam), Beneath The Coyote Hills (Spuyten Duyvil),
- Welcome To Saint Angel (Anaphora Literary Press), plus a short story collection: A Working Man’s Apocrypha (Oklahoma Univ. Press), called "brilliant" by the Los Angeles Times reviewer, Susan Salter Reynolds.

=== Other ===
- The Corona Chronicles from Cutthroat: A Journal of the Arts, Stories Inspired By COVID-19, and an anthology of California writers, Into The Deep End: The Writing Center Anthology 3. (editor)

== Personal life ==
Lucas has suffered from epilepsy since he was 12 years old.
