= Sandford Lyne =

American poet (1945–2007)

Sandford Lyne (March 27, 1945 – February 7, 2007) was an American poet, educator, and editor.

== Edited Publications ==
- Soft Hay Will Catch You: Poems by Young People (Simon & Schuster, 2004)
- Ten second Rainshowers: Poems by Young People (Simon & Schuster, 1996)

== Books on Writing ==
- Writing Poetry from the Inside Out (Sourcebooks, 2007)

== Poetry collections ==
- In The Footsteps of Paradise (Loch Raven Press, 2008)
