= Dorothy Mackie Low =

British writer

Lois Dorothea Pilkington Low
- Born: Lois Dorothea Pilkington; 15 July 1916; Edinburgh, Scotland, UK
- Died: 8 November 2002 (aged 86); Hampshire, England, UK
- Occupations: Literary agent, novelist
- Spouse: William Mackie Low (1938-1981)
- Children: 2 Roderick Craig Low (b. 1945), Murray Alexander Robert Low (b. 1949)
- Writing career
- Pen name: Dorothy Mackie Low, Lois Paxton, Zoë Cass
- Period: 1962-1983
- Genre: romance

Lois Dorothea Low, née Pilkington (born 15 July 1916 in Edinburgh, Scotland, UK - d. 8 November 2002 in Hampshire, England, UK) was a British writer of romance novels from 1962 to 1983 under different pseudonyms Dorothy Mackie Low, Lois Paxton, and Zoë Cass.

She was elected the fifth Chairman (1969–1971) of the Romantic Novelists' Association and also was a former Vice-President.

== Biography ==
Born Lois Dorothea Pilkington on 15 July 1916 in Edinburgh, Scotland, UK, she studied in the Edinburgh Ladies' College (now Mary Erskine School). In 1938, she married William Mackie Low, who died in 1981. They had two sons: Roderick Craig Low (b. 1945) and Murray Alexander Robert Low (b. 1949). She worked in insurance and as literary agent.

Low published romance novels from 1962 to 1983, under the pseudonyms of Dorothy Mackie Low, Lois Paxton, and Zoë Cass. She was elected the fifth Chairman (1969–1971) of the Romantic Novelists' Association and also was a former Vice-President. She died at 86, on 8 November 2002.

== Bibliography ==
=== As Dorothy Mackie Low ===
==== Novels ====
- Isle for a Stranger (1962)
- Dear Liar (1963)
- A Ripple on the Water (1964)
- The Intruder (1965)
- A House in the Country (1968)
- To Burgundy and Back (1970)
- The Glen is Ours

=== As Lois Paxton ===
==== Novels ====
- Man Who Died Twice (1968)
- Quiet Sound of Fear (1971)
- Who Goes There? (1972)
- Man in the Shadows (1983)

==== Anthologies in collaboration ====
- Woman's Weekly Fiction Series Omnibus Vol. 6 No 3 (The Icon Affair / Smiling Goddess / An Orange Branch / Sophia Verity) (1983) (with Juliet Armstrong, Margaret Redfern, and Briony Tedgle)

=== As Zoë Cass ===
==== Novels ====
- Island Of The Seven Hills (1974)
- The Silver Leopard (1976)
- Twist in the Silk (1980)
