= Alice Chetwynd Ley =

- Born: Alice Chetwynd Humphrey; 12 October 1913; Halifax, Yorkshire, England, UK
- Died: 2004 (aged 90–91)
- Occupations: Teacher, novelist
- Spouse: Kenneth James Ley
- Children: 2 Richard James Humphrey Ley; Graham Kenneth Hugh Ley
- Writing career
- Pen name: AliceChetwynd Ley
- Period: 1959–1989
- Genre: romance
- Website: alicechetwyndley.co.uk

Alice Chetwynd Ley, née Humphrey (12 October 1913 in Halifax, Yorkshire, England, UK – 2004) was a British writer of romance novels from 1959 to 1989.

She was the sixth elected Chairman (1971–1973) of the Romantic Novelists' Association and was named honor life member.

== Biography ==
Born Alice Chetwynd Humphrey on 12 October 1913 in Halifax, Yorkshire, England, UK, she studied at King Edward VI Grammar School in Birmingham. On 3 February 1945, she married Kenneth James Ley. They had two sons; Richard James Humphrey Ley and Graham Kenneth Hugh Ley.

She was teacher at Harrow College of Higher Education. In 1962, she obtained a diploma in Sociology at London University, in connection thus she obtained the Gilchrist Award of 1962. She was lecturer in Sociology and Social History, from 1968 to 1971.

Under her married name, Alice Chetwynd Ley, she published romance novels from 1959 to 1986. She was also tutor in Creative Writing, from 1962 to 1984. She was elected the sixth Chairman (1971–1973) of the Romantic Novelists' Association and was named honour life member.

Alice Chetwynd died in 2004.

== Bibliography ==
=== Novels ===
- The Jeweled Snuff Box (1959)
- The Georgian Rake (1960)
- The Guinea Stamp (1961) a.k.a. The Courting of Joanna
- The Master of Liversedge (1966) a.k.a. The Master and the Maiden
- Letters for a Spy (1970) a.k.a. The Sentimental Spy
- The Tenant of Chesdene Manor (1974) a.k.a. Beloved Diana
- The Beau and the Bluestocking (1975)
- An Advantageous Marriage (1977)
- At Dark of the Moon (1977)
- Regency Scandal (1979)
- A Conformable Wife (1981)
- The Intrepid Miss Haydon (1983)

=== Eversley Saga ===
1. The Clandestine Betrothal (1967)
2. The Toast of the Town (1968)
3. A Season at Brighton (1971)

=== Anthea & Justin Rutherford Saga ===
1. A Reputation Dies (1984)
2. A Fatal Assignation (1987)
3. Masquerade of Vengeance (1989)
