= Nancy Buckingham =

British writer of gothic and romance novels (1924–2022)

Nancy Buckingham Sawyer
- Born: Nancy Joyce Buckingham; 10 August 1924; Bristol, England
- Died: 8 September 2022 (aged 98)
- Occupation: Co-novelist
- Spouse: John Sawyer (1949–1992)
- Children: 2
- Writing career
- Pen name: Nancy Buckingham, Christina Abbey, Erica Quest, Nancy John, Hilary London
- Period: 1967–1992
- Genres: gothic, romance

Nancy Joyce Buckingham Sawyer (10 August 1924 – 8 September 2022) was a British writer who co-authored over 45 gothic and romance novels in collaboration with her husband, John Sawyer (4 October 1919 – 19 September 1992). She became the eighth elected Chairman (1975–1977) of the Romantic Novelists' Association, and was later one of its vice-presidents.

== Biography ==
Buckingham was born in Bristol, England, United Kingdom. In 1949 she married John Sawyer and they had a son and a daughter, David and Helen. For years she worked as a medical social worker and he as a director of a London advertising firm. The two wrote gothic and romance novels in collaboration beginning in 1967, under her maiden name Nancy Buckingham, and later under the pseudonyms Christina Abbey, Erica Quest, Nancy John and Hilary London. Their last novel was released in 1992, when John died. Nancy died on 8 September 2022, at the age of 98.

== Bibliography ==
=== As Nancy Buckingham ===
==== Single novels ====
- Storm in the Mountains = Heart of Marble (1967)
- The Hour Before Moonrise = Victim of Love (1967)
- Cloud Over Malverton (1967)
- The Legend of Baverstock Manor = Romantic Journey (1968)
- Call of Glengarron (1968)
- The Dark Summer (1968)
- Secret of the Ghostly Shroud (1969)
- Kiss of Hot Sun (1969)
- A Shroud of Silence (1970)
- The House Called Edenhythe (1970)
- Return to Vienna (1971)
- Quest for Alexis (1973)
- Valley of the Ravens (1973)
- The Jade Dragon (1974)
- The Other Cathy (1978)
- Vienna Summer (1979)
- Marianna (1981)

=== As Christina Abbey ===
==== Single novels ====
- Pattern of Loving (1971/May)
- Time for Trusting (1971/Oct)
- The House at Dragon's Bay (1975/Aug)

=== As Erica Quest ===
==== Single novels ====
- The Silver Castle (1978)
- The October Cabaret (1979)
- Design for Murder (1981/Aug)

==== Detective Chief Inspector Kate Maddox Series ====
1. Death Walk (1988/May)
2. Cold Coffin (1990/May)
3. Model Murder (1991/Mar)
4. Deadly Deceit (1992/Jun)

=== As Nancy John ===
==== Single novels ====
- Tormenting Flame (1980/Jul)
- The Spanish House (1980/Oct)
- Outback Summer (1981/Jul)
- To Trust Tomorrow (1981/Aug)
- A Man for Always (1981/Nov)
- So Many Tomorrows (1982/Apr)
- Web of Passion 1982/Jul)
- Make-Believe Bride (1982Dec)
- Summer Rhapsody (1983Feb)
- Never Too Late (1983Jun)
- Window to Happiness (1983Dec)
- Night with a Stranger (1984Feb)
- Dream of Yesterday (1984May)
- Champagne Nights (1984/Oct)
- Rendezvous (1985/Feb)
- The Moongate Wish (1985/May)
- Lookalike Love (1986/May)
- Secret Love (1986/Jul)

=== As Hilary London ===
==== Single novels ====
- Scent of Gold (1983/Sep)
