= Sheila Walsh (novelist) =

English novelist (1928–2009)

- Born: Sheila Frances O'Nions; 10 October 1928; Birmingham, England, UK
- Died: 20 January 2009 (aged 80)
- Occupation: Novelist
- Spouse: Desmond Walsh (1950–2009)
- Children: 2
- Writing career
- Pen name: Sheila Walsh; Sophie Leyton
- Period: 1975–2001
- Genre: Romance

Sheila Frances Walsh (née O'Nions; 10 October 1928 – 20 January 2009) was a British writer of romance novels from 1975 to 2001; she also wrote as Sophie Leyton.

In 1971, she joined the Southport Writers' Circle and was elected life president in 1986. In 1980 she became the vice-president of the Romantic Novelists' Association and later was the 13th elected Chairman (1985–1987).

== Biography ==
She was born Sheila Frances O'Nions on 10 October 1928 in Birmingham, England, United Kingdom. She was the daughter of Wilfred O'Nions, a civil servant, and his wife Margaret (Moran) O'Nions. She studied at the Notre Dame Convent at Birkdale, Southport. During the World War II, her family moved to Southport, Lancashire, where she met Desmond Walsh, son of Thomas Walsh, who owned a jewelry store at 39 Chapel Street since 1926. She studied at Southport College of Art, from 1945–48.

== Personal life ==
On 22 April 1950, Sheila married Desmond Walsh, and they had two daughters, Frances Mary and Teresa. Sheila worked during years in her husband's familiar jewelry store, with her husband, her brother-in-law, Gerard Walsh, and the latter's wife, Dorothy.

== Awards ==
Her debut novel, The Golden Songbird, won the Netta Muskett award for new writers from the Romantic Novelists' Association, and in 1984, her novel, A Highly Respectable Marriage, won the Elizabeth Goudge award.

== Death ==
Sheila Walsh died on 20 January 2009, at age 80, from undisclosed causes.

== Bibliography ==
=== As Sheila Walsh ===
==== Single novels ====
- The Golden Songbird (1975)
- Madalena (1976)
- The Sergeant Major's Daughter (1977)
- Lord Gilmore's Bride = A Fine Silk Purse (1978)
- The Incomparable Miss Brady (1980)
- The Rose Domino (1981)
- A Highly Respectable Marriage (1982)
- The Runaway Bride (1983)
- The Diamond Waterfall = Cousins of a Kind (1984)
- The Incorrigible Rake = Improper Acquaintances (1984)
- The Wary Widow (1985)
- An Insubstantial Pageant (1986)
- Bath Intrigue (1986)
- Lady Aurelia's Bequest (1987)
- Minerva's Marquis = Minerva's Marquess (1988)
- The Notorious Nabob = The Nabob (1989)
- The Arrogant Lord Alistair = A Woman of Little Importance (UK Title) (1990)
- A Woman of Little Importance (1991)
- Until Tomorrow (1993)
- Remember Me (1994)
- The Perfect Bride = Cornwell Bride (1994)
- Kate and the Marquess (1997)
- The Lady from Lisbon (2001)

==== Omnibus ====
- "The Christmas Star" in A Regency Christmas (1989) (with Mary Balogh, Sandra Heath, Emily Hendrickson, Emma Lange)
- A Regency Christmas II (1990) (with Mary Balogh, Carla Kelly, Anita Mills, Mary Jo Putney)
- "Midsummer Masquerade" in A Regency Summer (1992) (with Mary Balogh, Charlotte Louise Dolan, Sandra Heath, Melinda McRae)
- "Dear Delight" in Tokens of Love I (1994) (with Mary Balogh, Sandra Heath, Carol Proctor and Margaret Westhaven)
- "It Came Upon a Midnight Clear" in A Regency Christmas VI (1994) (with Mary Balogh, Sandra Heath, Emily Hendrickson, Emma Lange)

=== As Sophie Leyton ===
==== Single novels ====
- Lady Cecily's Dilemma (1980) aka The Pink Parasol (as Sheila Walsh)
