= Elizabeth Harrison (writer) =

English novelist (1921–2008)

Elizabeth Mary Fancourt Harrison
- Born: 12 January 1921; Watford, Hertfordshire, England
- Died: 26 February 2008 (aged 87); Surrey, England
- Occupations: Medical secretary, novelist
- Writing career
- Pen name: Elizabeth Harrison
- Period: 1965–1995
- Genre: romance

Elizabeth Harrison (12 January 1921 in Watford, Hertfordshire – 26 February 2008 in Surrey ) was an English writer of romance novels from 1965 to 1995. A medical secretary, she specialized in medical romances.

She was the ninth elected Chairman (1977–1979) of the Romantic Novelists' Association.

== Biography ==
Elizabeth Mary Fancourt Harrison was born on 12 January 1921 in Watford, Hertfordshire, England. She studied at Berkhamsted School. She worked as medical secretary, and during the World War II, she served at Women's Auxiliary Air Force.

As Elizabeth Harrison, she wrote romance novels from 1965 to 1995, she specialized in medical romances. She was the ninth elected Chairman (1977–1979) of the Romantic Novelists' Association.

She died on 26 February 2008 in Surrey, England.

== Bibliography ==
=== Single novels ===
- Coffee at Dobree's (1965)
- To Mend a Heart (1977)
- A Surgeon Called Amanda (1982)
- Marrying a Doctor (1984)
- The Senior Partner's Daughter (1994)
- Made for Each Other (1995)

=== London's Central Hospital ===
1. The Physicians (1966)
2. The Ravelston Affair (1967)
3. Corridors of Healing (1968)
4. Emergency Call (1970)
5. Accident Call (1971)
6. Ambulance Call (1972)
7. Surgeon's Call (1973)
8. On Call (1974)
9. Hospital Call (1975)
10. Dangerous Call (1976)
11. Young Doctor Goddard (1978)
12. Doctor Called Caroline (1979)
13. A Surgeon's Life (1983)
14. Surgeon's Affair (1985)
15. Surgeon at St. Mark's (1986)
16. The Surgeon She Married (1988)
17. The Faithful Type (1993)
