= Eileen Ramsay (author) =

British writer (1940–2023)

Eileen Ainsworth Ramsay
- Born: Eileen Ainsworth; 16 December 1940; Ayrshire, Scotland
- Died: 18 January 2023 (aged 82)
- Occupation: Novelist
- Spouse: Ian Ramsay
- Children: 2
- Writing career
- Pen name: Eileen Ainsworth Ramsay; Eileen Ramsay
- Language: English
- Period: 1985–2023
- Genres: Romance, Children's fiction
- Website: eileenramsay.co.uk

Eileen Ramsay (née Ainsworth; 16 December 1940 – 18 January 2023) was a British writer of romance novels. She wrote 18 books from 1985.

== Biography ==
Eileen Ainsworth was born in Ayrshire, Scotland on 16 December 1940. After graduating she went to teach in the United States for 18 years. She married Ian Ramsay, a Scottish scientist, and they had two children. They returned to Scotland, and after teaching for a few years she became a full-time writer.

Ramsay was elected the twenty-seventh chairman (2015–2017) of the Romantic Novelists' Association.

Ramsay died of pneumonia on 18 January 2023 at the age of 82.

== Bibliography ==
=== As Eileen Ainsworth Ramsay ===
==== Romance novel ====
- The Mysterious Marquis (1985)

=== As Eileen Ramsay ===
==== Romance novels ====
- The Broken Gate (1994)
- The Dominie's Lassie (1995)
- Butterflies in December (1995)
- The Quality of Mercy (1997)
- Walnut Shell Days (1997)
- Harvest of Courage (1998)
- Never Call It Loving (1998)
- The Wings of Friendship (2001)
- The Feein' Market (2002)
- Lace for a Lady (2002)
- Someday, Somewhere (2003)
- A Way of Forgiving (2004)
- The Stuff of Dreams (2005)
- Rainbow's End (2006)
- Henriqueta's treasure (2008)
- Love Changes Everything (2012)

==== Flowers of Scotland ====
1. Rich Girl, Poor Girl (2017)
2. The Farm Girl's Dream (2017)
3. A Pinch of Salt (2017)

==== Children's fiction ====
- Danger by Gaslight (1998)

==== Anthologies ====
- Sakura and other stories (2012)
