= Catherine Jones (novelist) =

British novelist

Catherine Lace Jones
- Born: Catherine Lace; 25 October 1956 (age 69)
- Occupation: Novelist
- Spouse: Mr. Jones
- Children: 3
- Writing career
- Pen name: Annie Jones (in collaboration), Catherine Jones, Kate Lace, Fiona Field
- Period: 1990–present
- Genre: Romance
- Website: www.catherine-jones.co.uk

Catherine Jones, née Lace (born 25 October 1956) is a British writer of romance novels since 1990. She also wrote as Kate Lace and Fiona Field and as Annie Jones in collaboration.

She is the twentyfourth elected Chairman (2007–2009) of the Romantic Novelists' Association.

== Biography ==
Born Catherine Lace on 25 October 1956, she went to an all-girls school then joined the army and served for 8 years, where she met her husband. She left the army to have their three children.

She wrote her first novel, Gumboots and Pearls, in collaboration with another army wife, under the pseudonym Annie Jones. Later she started to write books under her married name Catherine Jones. Since 2007, she also signed under her maiden name Kate Lace and since 2014 as Fiona Field.

== Bibliography ==
=== As Annie Jones ===
==== Novels ====
- Gumboots and Pearls (1990)

=== As Catherine Jones ===
==== Novels ====
- Army Wives (1996)
- Sisters in Arms (1998)
- Going Solo (2000)
- A Regimental Affair (2004)
- A Question of Loyalty (2005)
- Eye of the Storm (2006)

=== As Kate Lace ===
==== Novels ====
- The Chalet Girl (2007)
- The Movie Girl (2007)
- The Trophy Girl (2008)
- The Love Boat (2009)
- Moonlighting (2010)
- A Class Act (2010)
- Gypsy Wedding (2011)
- Cox (2012)

=== As Fiona Field ===
==== Novels ====
- Soldiers' Wives (2014)
- Soldiers' Daughters (2015)
- Civvy Street (2016)
