= A. H. Behrend =

Polish-born composer (1853–1935)

Arthur Henry Behrend (2 October 1853 – 1935) was a Polish-born composer. He is remembered for his setting of Tennyson's poem "Crossing the Bar".

== History ==
Behrend was born in Danzig, a grandson of Michael William Balfe, composer of the opera The Bohemian Girl. He was best known in his lifetime for the 1885 song Daddy (lyrics by Mary Mark-Lemon), (Note: Mary Mark Lemon (8 March 1853 – 7 February 1884) was the fourth daughter of Punch editor Mark Lemon. She married Rev. Douglas Blaker, who died young and she took to writing to support herself, then herself died just as she was becoming successful.) which made a fortune for him, despite disposing of his copyright while it was still popular. A long-standing member of the Savage Club, he died in London.

== List of compositions ==
Popular

- "The Beautiful Land of Nod"
- "Bonjour, ma belle"
- "The Gift"
- "Hearts that Love" (Frederic Weatherly)
- "The Silver Chord"
- "Think of Me" (Mary Mark-Lemon)
- "When Everything Is Young"

Art songs

- "All's Right" (Robert Browning)
- "The Child Musician" (Austin Dobson)
- "Clear and Cool" (Charles Kingsley)
- "Crossing the Bar" (Alfred, Lord Tennyson)
- "Stay, Stay at Home" (Henry Wadsworth Longfellow)
- "The Rainy Day" (Henry Wadsworth Longfellow)
- "The Song of the Shirt" (Thomas Hood)
- "A Widow Bird" (in Through the Year. A Cantata for Ladies' Voices) (Percy Bysshe Shelley)
