= Romantic Novelists' Association Awards =

British literary award

RoNA Award
- Awarded for: Excellence in romance novel
- Country: United Kingdom
- Presented by: Romantic Novelists' Association
- First award: 1960
- Website: romanticnovelistsassociation.org/awards

The Romantic Novel of the Year Award is an award for romance novels since 1960, presented by the Romantic Novelists' Association, and since 2003, for novellas, as the Love Story of the Year (now RoNA Rose Award).

== Winners ==
=== Romantic Novel of the Year a.k.a. RoNA Award a.k.a. Popular Romantic Fiction ===
This award recognises the best long romance novels.

- 1960: More Than Friendship by Mary Howard (Collins)
- 1961: Witches' Sabbath by Paula Allardyce (Hodder & Stoughton)
- 1962: Larksbrook by Margaret Maddocks (Hurst & Blackett)
- 1963: House Divided by Dorothy M. Cray (Hurst & Blackett)
- 1964: Journey from Yesterday by Suzanne Ebel (Collins)
- 1965: The Silver Answer by Margaret Maddocks (Hurst & Blackett)
- 1967: The Truth Game by Anne Betteridge (Hurst & Blackett)
- 1968: The Future Is Forever by Maynah Lewis (Hurst & Blackett)
- 1969: Comfort and Keep by Doris E. Smith (Ward Lock)
- 1970: Cat On A Broomstick by Joanne Marshall (Herbert Jenkins)
- 1970: Thea by Margaret Maddocks (Hurst & Blackett)
- 1970: Broken Tapestry by Rona Randall (Hurst & Blackett)
- 1971: Flower Of Silence by Joanne Marshall (Harlequin Mills & Boon)
- 1972: The Pride Of Innocence by Maynah Lewis (Hurst & Blackett)
- 1973: The House Of Kuragin by Constance Heaven (Heinemann)
- 1974: The Burning Lamp by Frances Murray (Hodder & Stoughton)
- 1975: Vote For A Silk Gown by Jay Allerton (Troubadour)
- 1976: The Look Of Innocence by Anna Gilbert (Hodder & Stoughton)
- 1976 - Best Modern Award: The Moon Is Square by Margaret Maddocks (Hurst & Blackett)
- 1977: Every Man A King by Anne Worboys (Hodder & Stoughton)
- 1978: Merlin's Keep by Madeleine Brent (Souvenir)
- 1978 - Best Modern Award: It Was The Lark by Catherine Macarthur (Macdonald & Jane)
- 1979 - Award Of Special Merit: The Emerald Peacock by Katharine Gordon (Hodder & Stoughton)
- 1979: Countess by Josephine Edgar (Macdonald & Jane)
- 1980: Parson Harding's Daughter by Joanna Trollope (Hutchinson)
- 1980 - Best Modern Award: Mr Rodriguez by Mary Howard (Collins)
- 1981: The Red Staircase by Gwendoline Butler (Collins)
- 1982: Zemindar by Valerie Fitzgerald (Bodley)
- 1983: Magic Flutes by Eva Ibbotson (Century)
- 1984: A Highly Respectable Marriage by Sheila Walsh (Hurst & Blackett)
- 1985: Sunrise by Rosie Thomas (Piatkus)
- 1986: A Song Twice Over by Brenda Jagger (Collins)
- 1987: A Better World Than This by Marie Joseph (Century)
- 1988: The Juniper Bush by Audrey Howard (Century)
- 1989: The Peacock's Feather by Sarah Woodhouse (Century)
- 1990: Passing Glory by Reay Tannahill (Century)
- 1991: Phantom by Susan Kay (Transworld)
- 1992: Sandstorm by June Knox-Mawer (Weidenfeld)
- 1993: Emily by Cynthia Harrod-Eagles (Sidgwick & Jackson)
- 1994: Consider The Lily by Elizabeth Buchan (Macmillan)
- 1995: Change Of Heart by Charlotte Bingham (Doubleday)
- 1996: Coming Home by Rosamunde Pilcher (Hodder & Stoughton)
- 1997: The Hours Of The Night by Sue Gee (Century)
- 1998: Kiss And Kin by Angela Lambert (Bantam)
- 1999: Learning To Swim by Clare Chambers (Arrow)
- 2000: Dancing In The Dark by Maureen Lee (Orion)
- 2001: Someone Like You by Cathy Kelly (HarperCollins)
- 2002: The Other Boleyn Girl by Philippa Gregory (HarperCollins)
- 2003: Playing James by Sarah Mason (Time Warner)
- 2004: Foreign Fruit by Jojo Moyes (Hodder & Stoughton)
- 2005: A Good Voyage by Katharine Davies (Chatto & Windus)
- 2006: Gardens of Delight by Erica James (Orion)
- 2007: Iris & Ruby by Rosie Thomas (HarperCollins)
- 2008: Pillow Talk by Freya North (HarperCollins)
- 2009: East of the Sun by Julia Gregson (Orion)
- 2010: Lost Dogs and Lonely Hearts by Lucy Dillon (Hodder & Stoughton)
- 2011: The Last Letter From Your Lover by Jojo Moyes (Hodder & Stoughton)
- 2012: Please Don't Stop The Music by Jane Lovering (Choc Lit)
- 2013: Welcome to Rosie Hopkin's Sweetshop of Dreams by Jenny Colgan (Sphere, Little Brown)
- 2014: A Night on the Orient Express by Veronica Henry (Orion)
- 2015: Struck by Joss Stirling (Oxford University Press)
- 2016: Letters to the Lost by Iona Grey (Simon & Schuster)
- 2017: Love Song by Sophia Bennett (Chicken House)
- 2018: This Love by Dani Atkins (Simon & Schuster)
- 2019: You Me Everything by Catherine Isaac (Simon & Schuster)
- 2020: The Truths and Triumphs of Grace Atherton by Anstey Harris (Simon & Schuster)
- 2021: Sing Me a Secret by Julie Houston (Aria, Head of Zeus)
- 2022: The River Between Us by Liz Fenwick (HQ HarperCollins)
- 2023: A Christmas Celebration by Heidi Swain (Simon & Schuster)
- 2024: The Wedding Dress Repair Shop by Trisha Ashley (Bantam)
- 2025: All the Painted Stars by Emma Denny (HQ)

=== Love Story of the Year a.k.a. RoNA Rose Award a.k.a. Shorter Romantic Novel ===
This award (formerly the Love Story of the Year) recognises the best in category and shorter romance, serials in magazines are also eligible.

- 2003: Illusion by Julia Wild (Heartline)
- 2004: A Damnable Rogue by Anne Herries (Harlequin Mills & Boon)
- 2005: A Family of His Own by Liz Fielding (Harlequin Mills & Boon)
- 2006: Contracted: Corporate Wife by Jessica Hart (Harlequin Mills & Boon)
- 2007: Marrying Max by Nell Dixon (DC Thomson)
- 2008: Breakfast at Giovanni's by Kate Hardy (Harlequin Mills & Boon)
- 2009: Mistress: Hired for the Billionaire's Pleasure by India Grey (Harlequin Mills & Boon)
- 2010: Animal Instincts by Nell Dixon (Little Black Dress)
- 2011: The Piratical Miss Ravenhurst by Louise Allen (Harlequin Historicals)
- 2012: The Dangerous Lord Darrington by Sarah Mallory (HMB Historical Regency)
- 2013: Beneath the Major's Scars by Sarah Mallory (HMB Historical Regency)
- 2014: Bound by a Baby by Kate Hardy (Harlequin Mills & Boon)
- 2015: Scandal’s Virgin by Louise Allen (Harlequin Mills & Boon)
- 2016: Doctor... To Duchess? by Annie O'Neil (Harlequin Mills & Boon)
- 2017: Christmas in the Boss’s Castle by Scarlet Wilson (Harlequin Mills & Boon)
- 2018: Christmas at the Little Village School by Jane Lovering (Choc Lit)
- 2019: Secret Baby, Second Chance by Jane Godman (Mills & Boon)
- 2020: Miss Amelia’s Mistletoe Marquess by Jenni Fletcher (Mills & Boon Historical)
- 2021: A Will, a Wish and a Wedding by Kate Hardy (Mills & Boon True Love)
- 2022: A Proposal to Risk Their Friendship by Louise Allen (Mills & Boon)
- 2023: The Earl’s Mysterious Lady by Louise Allen (Mills & Boon Historical)
- 2024: Cinderella’s Deal with the Colonel by Jenni Fletcher (Harlequin Mills and Boon)
- 2025: Camera Shy by Julia Boggio (Self Published)

=== Contemporary Romantic Novel of the Year ===
This award recognises the best in category for mainstream romantic novels set in the present world or society.

- 2012: Summer of Love by Katie Fforde (Century)
- 2013: Recipe for Love by Katie Fforde (Century)
- 2014: A Night on the Orient Express by Veronica Henry (Orion)
- 2015: A Hundred Pieces of Me by Lucy Dillon (Hodder & Stoughton)
- 2016: The Wedding Cake Tree by Melanie Hudson (Choc Lit)
- 2017: Summer at the Comfort Food Cafe by Debbie Johnson (HarperImpulse)
- 2018: Together by Julie Cohen (Orion)
- 2019: One Thousand Stars and You by Isabelle Broom (Michael Joseph)
- 2020: A Summer to Remember by Sue Moorcroft (Avon, HarperCollins)
- 2021: My One True North by Milly Johnson (Simon & Schuster)
- 2022: A Sky Full of Stars by Dani Atkins (Head of Zeus)
- 2023: A Cottage Full of Secrets by Jane Lovering (Boldwood Books)
- 2024: Evergreens by Liam Brown (Legend Press)
- 2025: A Love Letter to Paris by Rebecca Raisin (Boldwood Books)

=== Historical Romantic Novel of the Year ===
This award recognises the best in category for a romantic novel set pre 1960.

- 2012: Highland Storms by Christina Courtenay (Choc Lit)
- 2013: The Apothecary's Daughter by Charlotte Betts
- 2014: The Gilded Fan by Christina Courtenay (Choc Lit)
- 2015: The Girl Who Came Home by Hazel Gaynor (William Morrow)
- 2016: Letters to the Lost by Iona Grey (Simon & Schuster)
- 2017: It Was Only Ever You by Kate Kerrigan (Head of Zeus)
- 2018: The Designer by Marius Gabriel (Lake Union Publishing)
- 2019: The Temptation of Gracie by Santa Montefiore (Simon & Schuster)
- 2020: The French Photographer by Natasha Lester (Sphere)
- 2021: Rags-to-Riches Wife by Catherine Tinley (Mills & Boon Historical)
- 2022: A Waltz with the Outspoken Governess by Catherine Tinley (Mills & Boon)
- 2023: The Three Lives of Alix St Pierre by Natasha Lester (Sphere)
- 2024: The Night She Met the Duke by Sarah Mallory (Harlequin Mills & Boon)
- 2025: Joint winners The Wicked Lady by Judy Leigh (Boldwood) and The Last Song of Winter by Lulu Taylor (Macmillan)

=== Romantic Comedy Novel ===
This award recognises the best in category for a romantic novel intended to be consistently humorous or amusing.

- 2012: Please Don't Stop The Music by Jane Lovering (Choc Lit)
- 2013: Welcome to Rosie Hopkin's Sweetshop of Dreams by Jenny Colgan (Sphere, Little Brown)
- 2014: It's Raining Men by Milly Johnson (Simon & Schuster)
- 2015: Just a Girl, Standing in Front of a Boy by Lucy-Anne Holmes (Sphere)
- 2016: Afternoon Tea at the Sunflower Cafe by Milly Johnson (Simon & Schuster)
- 2017: Out of Practice by Penny Parkes (Simon & Schuster)
- 2018: The Summer Seaside Kitchen by Jenny Colgan (Sphere/Little, Brown)
- 2019: Not Just For Christmas by Natalie Cox (Orion)
- 2020: A Question of Us by Mary Jayne Baker (Aria Fiction, Head of Zeus)
- 2021: Sunny Days and Sea Breezes by Carole Matthews (Sphere, Little, Brown)
- 2022: Joint winners Mr Right Across the Street by Kathryn Freeman (One More Chapter) and The Promise of Summer by Bella Osborne (Avon)
- 2023: Take a Chance on Greece by Emily Kerr (One More Chapter)
- 2024: You’ve Got This by Maxine Morrey (Boldwood Books)
- 2025: Love Me Till Wednesday by Suzanne Lissaman (Self published)

=== Epic Romantic Novel of the Year ===
This award recognises the best in category for romantic novels that have a broad and sweeping scope. May be either contemporary or historical and may include time-slip.

- 2012: The Kashmir Shawl by Rosie Thomas (HarperCollins)
- 2013: Dearest Rose by Rowan Coleman
- 2014: The Fever Tree by Jennifer McVeigh (Penguin)
- 2015: Pieces of You by Ella Harper (Avon)
- 2016: The Secrets We Share by Emma Hannigan (Headline Review)
- 2017: Little Girl Lost by Janet Gover (Choc Lit)
- 2018: This Love by Dani Atkins (Simon & Schuster)

=== Young Adult Romantic Novel ===
This award recognises the best in category for a romantic novel in which the main characters are teenagers or young adults.

- 2012: Dark Ride by Caroline Green (Piccadilly Press)
- 2013: Witchstruck by Victoria Lamb
- 2014: Linked by Imogen Howson (Quercus)
- 2015: Struck by Joss Stirling (Oxford University Press)
- 2016: Crow Mountain by Lucy Inglis (Chicken House)
- 2017: Love Song by Sophia Bennett (Chicken House)
- 2018: Ten Birthdays by Kerry Wilkinson (Bookouture)

=== Paranormal or Speculative Romantic Novel a.k.a. Fantasy Romantic Novel ===
This award recognises the best in category for a romantic novel that may be paranormal, fantasy, science fiction, time-slip etc.

- 2017: Max Seventeen by Kate Johnson (Independent)
- 2018: The Other Us by Fiona Harper (HQ)
- 2019: Living in the Past by Jane Lovering (Choc Lit)
- 2020: Queenie Malone's Paradise Hotel by Ruth Hogan (Two Roads)
- 2021: Echoes of the Runes by Christina Courtenay (Headline Review)
- 2022: A Marvellous Light by Freya Marske (Pan Macmillan)
- 2023: I Let You Fall by Sara Downing (author) (Quilla Books (TCK Publishing) )
- 2024: Girl, Goddess, Queen by Bea Fitzgerald (Penguin)
- 2025: Now Comes the Mist by Julie C. Dao (Podium)

=== Debut Romantic Novel ===
This award recognises the best romantic novel by a first-time author.

- 2019: The Rules of Seeing by Joe Heap (HarperCollins)
- 2020: The Forgotten Village by Lorna Cook (Avon, HarperCollins)
- 2021: The Authenticity Project by Clare Pooley (Bantam Press)
- 2022: Two Metres From You by Heidi Stephens (Headline Accent)
- 2023: Always by Your Side by Julie Haworth (Simon & Schuster UK)
- 2024: Be More Octopus by Suzanne Lissaman (Octosulis Publishing)
- 2025: Plot Twist by Breea Keenan (Headline)

=== Romantic Thriller ===
This award recognises the best romantic novel featuring a substantial thriller, suspense, mystery or crime story, alongside or fully entwined with a romantic story.

- 2020: Knowing You by Samantha Tonge (Canelo)
- 2021: The House by the Sea by Louise Douglas (Boldwood Books)
- 2022: All That We Have Lost by Suzanne Fortin (Aria)
- 2023: Six Days by Dani Atkins (Aria (Head of Zeus) )
- 2024: The Dance Teacher of Paris by Suzanne Fortin (Embla Books)
- 2025: Whatever it Takes by Joy Wood (Self Published)

=== Romantic Saga ===
This award recognises the best romantic novel featuring saga elements of characters overcoming social adversity, usually set in the past.

- 2020: The Street of Broken Dreams by Tania Crosse (Aria Fiction, Head of Zeus)
- 2021: Bobby’s War by Shirley Mann (Zaffre, Bonnier Books UK)
- 2022: The Mother’s Day Club by Rosie Hendry (Brown Book Group)
- 2023: A New Start for the Wrens by Vicki Beeby (Canelo)
- 2024: A New Start at the Beach Hotel by Francesca Capaldi (author) (Hera Books)
- 2025: Secrets for the Three Sisters by Annie Groves (HarperCollins)

=== Festive Holiday Romantic Novel ===
This award recognises the best romantic novel set in the winter festive season featuring Christmas, Hanukkah, Kwanzaa, Yule, New Year etc.

- 2022: Winter at Cliff’s End Cottage by Sheila Norton (Brown Book Group)
- 2023: This Year’s for Me and You by Emily Bell (author) (Penguin Michael Joseph)
- 2024: Only for Christmas by Tracy Corbett (Canelo)
- 2025: The Secret Santa Project by Tracy Bloom (HarperCollins)
