= Anne Lamb =

Anne Lamb may refer to:

- Anne Rundle (1920–1989), née Lamb, British author
- Anne Richelieu Lamb (1807–1878), Scottish feminist writer

== See also ==
- Anna Lambe (born 2000), Canadian Inuk actress
