= Milly Johnson =

British author of romantic fiction

- Born: 23 February 1964 (age 62); Barnsley, South Yorkshire, England
- Education: University of Exeter
- Occupation: Writer
- Children: 2
- Writing career
- Genre: Romantic comedy
- Website: millyjohnson.co.uk

Milly Johnson is a British author known for her work in romantic fiction. In addition to her novels, she has worked as an after-dinner speaker, poet, professional joke writer, short story writer, and newspaper columnist.

== Biography ==
Born in Barnsley, Johnson was educated at Agnes Road Primary School, Longcar Junior School, and Hall Balk School for Girls. She later studied drama and teacher training at St Luke's Campus, University of Exeter.

She lived for many years in Haworth, West Yorkshire, where she became acquainted with author Stan Barstow, who also resided in the area. During this time, Johnson held various administrative positions while supplementing her income by writing jokes and poems for the greetings card industry. She also worked as a ghost-writer for Purple Ronnie in its early stages. She later became a professional copywriter within the greetings card sector.

Johnson’s breakthrough into publishing came at the age of 41 with the submission of her manuscript The Yorkshire Pudding Club, which was inspired by her experience of being pregnant simultaneously with two friends. In 2005, she secured her first two-book deal with Simon & Schuster.

Her work has received multiple accolades, including a nomination for the Melissa Nathan Award for Romantic Comedy in 2012, and two wins of the RoNA Award for Comedy Romance in 2014 and 2016. She also appeared as a winner on a regional edition of Channel 4’s Come Dine With Me. In 2020, Johnson was honoured with the Romantic Novelists' Association's Outstanding Achievement Award.

== Awards and honours ==
Year	Awarding Body	Category	Nominee/ Nominated Work	Result
2012	Melissa Nathan Award	Comedy Romance	An Autumn Crush	Nominated
2014	Romantic Novelists' Association Awards	Romantic Comedy Novel	It's Raining Men	Won
2015	Yorkshire Society Awards	Arts and Culture	Milly Johnson	Won
2015	Romantic Novelists' Association Awards	Romantic Comedy Novel	The Teashop on the Corner	Nominated
2016	Romantic Novelists' Association Awards	Romantic Comedy Novel	Afternoon Tea at the Sunflower Café	Won
2017	Romantic Novelists' Association Awards	Contemporary Romantic Novel	The Queen of Wishful Thinking	Nominated
2020	Romantic Novelists' Association Awards	Outstanding Achievement	Milly Johnson	Won
2021	Goldsboro Books Awards	Romantic Contemporary Fiction	My One True North	Won

In recognition of her contributions to literature and her strong connection to the region, Johnson was appointed Vice President of the Yorkshire Society in 2018. Her work has earned her a number of accolades and nominations throughout her career, reflecting both her popularity with readers and her standing within the literary community.

== Bibliography ==
Year	Title	Publisher	ISBN	Notes
2007	The Yorkshire Pudding Club	Simon & Schuster	978-1849834100	
2008	The Birds and the Bees	Simon & Schuster	978-1849834094	
2009	A Spring Affair	Simon & Schuster	978-1847392824	
2010	A Summer Fling	Simon & Schuster	978-1847392831	
2011	Here Come The Girls	Simon & Schuster	978-1849832052	
2011	An Autumn Crush	Simon & Schuster	978-1849832038	
2012	White Wedding	Simon & Schuster	978-0857208965	
2012	The Wedding Dress	Simon & Schuster	978-1471111785	E-book exclusive.
2012	A Winter Flame	Simon & Schuster	978-1471187773	
2013	The Four Seasons Collection	Simon & Schuster	978-1471128776	A compilation of A Spring Affair, A Summer Fling, An Autumn Crush and A Winter Flame. E-book exclusive.
2013	It's Raining Men	Simon & Schuster	978-1471114618	
2014	The Teashop on the Corner	Simon & Schuster	978-1471114649	
2014	Here Come The Boys	Simon & Schuster	978-1471133886	E-book exclusive.
2015	Afternoon Tea at the Sunflower Café	Simon & Schuster	978-1471140464	
2015	Ladies Who Launch	Simon & Schuster	978-1471152160	E-book exclusive.
2016	Sunshine Over Wildflower Cottage	Simon & Schuster	978-1471140488	
2016	The Barn on Half Moon Hill	Simon & Schuster	978-1471158711	E-book exclusive.
2017	The Queen of Wishful Thinking	Simon & Schuster	978-1471161735	
2018	The Perfectly Imperfect Woman	Simon & Schuster	978-1471161773	
2018	The Mother of All Christmases	Simon & Schuster	978-1398535145	
2019	The Magnificent Mrs Mayhew	Simon & Schuster	978-1471178474	
2019	A Cat-Shaped Space	Self-published	979-8764585741	Poetry book.
2020	The Little Dreams of Lara Cliffe	Simon & Schuster	978-1471186202	Quick Reads production.
2020	My One True North	Simon & Schuster	978-1471178528	
2020	I Wish It Could Be Christmas Every Day	Simon & Schuster	978-1471178566	
2021	The Woman in the Middle	Simon & Schuster	978-1471199028	
2023	Together, Again	Simon & Schuster	978-1471199066	
2024	The Happiest Ever After	Simon & Schuster	978-1398523562	
2025	Same Time Next Week	Simon & Schuster	978-1398523616	
2025	Let the Bells Ring Out	Simon & Schuster	978-1398547063	
2025	Lift Me Up	Amazon Original Stories	978-1662543234	E-book exclusive.

== Literary Projects and Charitable Works ==
In addition to her 23 novels, Johnson has published several shorter works, many of which were released exclusively as e-books. These include The Wedding Dress (2012), a collection of short stories themed around weddings, and Here Come the Boys (2014). In 2015, she released Ladies Who Launch, which serves both as a sequel to Here Come the Boys and as a prequel to Afternoon Tea at the Sunflower Café. In May 2016, Johnson published the 16,000-word short story The Barn on Half Moon Hill to raise funds for the Care for Claire campaign, established in support of Claire Throssell, whose children were killed in a domestic abuse-related murder–suicide. In 2019, she released a poetry collection titled A Cat-Shaped Space, with all proceeds donated to Yorkshire Cat Rescue. In 2020, she contributed the novella The Little Dreams of Lara Cliffe to the relaunched Quick Reads initiative, which aims to encourage reading among adults.

== External links and articles ==
- The Milly Johnson Website
- Milly Johnson’s Blog
