= Carole Matthews =

British writer

Carole Matthews is a successful and popular British author, famous for her sense of humour and her romantic comedy novels. Her books have sold over 7.0 million books worldwide and have been published in more than 31 countries. In 2011, Matthews was inducted into the Festival of Romance Hall of Fame for her outstanding contribution to romance writing.

== Biography ==
Matthews was born in St Helens, Merseyside in 1960 and was always an avid reader. She attended Champneys College where she studied Beauty Therapy. She has worked as a secretary, ice-cream lady, television presenter, beauty therapist and freelance writer. Her first book was Let's Meet on Platform Eight and was published in 1997.

Her latest book is Christmas for Beginners.

In 2021 Carole won the Romantic Novelists' Association - Romantic Novel of the Year Award. For Sunny days and Sea Breezes.

She has published 34 novels and has appeared on the Sunday Times and USA Today bestsellers lists and her books, Welcome To The Real World, Wrapped up in You, and Happiness for Beginners made the shortlist for the Romantic Novelists' Association - Romantic Novel of the Year Award.

Her 4th book For Better, For Worse, was picked in summer 2002 for a TV book club pick in America, Reading with Ripa, on the show Live with Regis and Kelly. She has sold over 6.8 million books worldwide and is published in more than 31 countries. She has had more than 4.5 million library lends in the United Kingdom since she started writing.

In 2011, she was inducted into the Festival of Romance Hall of Fame for her outstanding contribution to romance writing. She is also an Amazon number one bestseller.

In 2015 Carole was presented with an Outstanding Achievement Award from the Romantic Novelists' Association for 25 novels which have consistently appeared in bestseller lists, and for her continued championing of the RNA and romantic fiction.

As well as writing, Matthews has also been a television presenter and is a regular radio guest.

She lives in Milton Keynes with her husband, Kevin, whom she regularly refers to as 'Lovely Kev', a "minimalist home with no carpets, curtains, or ornaments. Matthews describes herself as a writer of romantic comedy, drinker of champagne, baker of cakes, and eater of chocolate".

== UK Books ==
Year	Title
1997	Let's Meet on Platform 8
1998	A Whiff of Scandal
1999	More to Life than this
2001	For Better, For Worse
2002	A Minor Indiscretion
2003	A Compromising Position
2004	The Sweetest Taboo
2005	With or Without You
2006	You Drive Me Crazy
2006	Welcome to the Real World
2007	The Chocolate Lovers' Club
2007	The Chocolate Lovers' Diet
2008	It's A Kind of Magic
2008	All You Need Is Love
2009	The Difference a Day Makes
2009	That Loving Feeling
2010	It's Now or Never
2010	The Only Way is Up
2011	Wrapped Up In You
2012	Summer Daydreams
2012	With Love at Christmas
2013	A Cottage by the Sea
2013	Calling Mrs Christmas
2014	A Place to Call Home
2014	The Christmas Party
2015	The Cake Shop in the Garden
2015	The Chocolate Lovers' Christmas
2016	The Chocolate Lovers' Wedding
2016	Paper Hearts and Summer Kisses
2017	Christmas Cakes, and Mistletoe Nights
2018	Million Love Songs
2019	Happiness For Beginners
2020	Sunny Days and Sea Breezes
2020	Christmas for Beginners
