= Aylesbury High School =

Location
- Walton Road; Aylesbury, Buckinghamshire, HP21 7SX; England; 51°48′43″N 0°48′08″W

Information
- Type: Academy Grammar School
- Motto: "prepare, challenge, inspire"
- Established: 1959
- Specialist: Language College
- Department for Education URN: 136846 Tables
- Ofsted: Reports
- Co- Chairs of Governors: Helen Bush and Dr Kate Weir
- Headmistress: Marieke Forster
- Gender: Girls
- Age: 11 to 18
- Enrolment: 1200
- Houses: 6
- Colours: Navy and white
- Website: http://www.ahs.bucks.sch.uk

Aylesbury High School (AHS) is a girls grammar school in Aylesbury, Buckinghamshire. It was founded in 1959, when the previously co-educational Aylesbury Grammar School (founded 1598) split to become two single-sex grammar schools. The two institutions remain on adjacent sites. The school takes its pupils from a wide area as far from Aylesbury as Oxford and Milton Keynes, as admissions are determined by the eleven-plus. The current headmistress is Marieke Forster.

The school is colloquially referred to by locals as "Aylesbury Girls'" and by the students as "the High" or "AHS".

== Admissions ==
The school is a selective girls' grammar school, and as such, entry requirements are dictated by the eleven-plus, now called transfer tests, although several students are admitted on appeal to Buckinghamshire County Council. In the fairly unusual event of free places, the school will accept pupils in Year 8 upon success in the twelve-plus and later upon reasonable evidence that prospective pupils are academically capable. A large number of pupils are also admitted to the Sixth Form from both local, state, and independent schools, though impressive GCSE results are required and competition for these places is high.

The school educates girls from the age of 11, in Year 7, through to the age of 18, in Upper VI. The school has its largest intakes at Year 7 followed by Lower VI. On completing GCSEs, most girls stay on to complete their A-levels at the school's sixth-form.

It is situated east of the town centre on the southern side of the A41, between Walton (to the west) and Victoria Park (to the east). This site was built and opened in 1959 by Princess Alexandra and is reflective of the modern, minimalist post-war architecture of the time. The school is housed in gardens, which the students enjoy, particularly in the summer.

=== Specialist status ===
The school had been awarded specialist school status in Languages, which it kept until Summer 2011, when it gained Academy Status. Languages remain a particular strength at the school and are extensively resourced and promoted. Each girl is required to take at least one language to the GCSE level, and many take languages on to A Level and university.

=== Academy status ===
In July 2011 the school became an Academy.

== Houses ==
Each pupil is placed into one of six houses upon starting at the school. The houses are as follows:

House	Colour	Significance
Ascott	Blue	Built during James I's reign as "Ascott Hall," it became a Rothschild estate in 1873. Transformed by Leopold de Rothschild, Ascott House combines classical and informal styles. Its blue color reflects a connection to the Rothschild family's preference for bold, distinctive hues in their country houses.
Claydon	Yellow	Constructed between 1757 and 1771, Claydon House was designed by James Wyatt for the Verney family. A blend of classical and Palladian styles, its yellow façade symbolizes the optimism of the Georgian era. The choice of yellow was influenced by its limestone brickwork and gold detailing.
Hughenden	Purple	Originally built in the 18th century, Hughenden Manor became Benjamin Disraeli's country retreat in 1848. The Jacobethan architecture reflects Victorian influence. Its purple color is linked to Disraeli’s affinity for regal and aristocratic symbolism, denoting his association with the British monarchy.
Missenden	Green	Founded in 1133 and later rebuilt in the Regency Gothic style, Missenden Abbey was altered after a fire in 1985. Its green hue reflects the lush landscape of the surrounding area, echoing the abbey’s connection to nature and its monastic origins, as green represents life and renewal. It is traditional location of the Aylesbury High School and Aylesbury Grammar School Leavers' Ball.
Stowe	Red	Built between 1676 and 1700, Stowe House, is another country estate in Buckinghamshire that was designed in the Palladian style. The red colour chosen for the house at Aylesbury High School emulates the dramatic aesthetic of the grand house and its gardens, symbolising power.
Waddesdon	Orange	Constructed between 1874-1889 for Baron Ferdinand de Rothschild, Waddesdon Manor is a French Renaissance-style château. The orange house colour was chosen to reflect the vibrant, opulent interior and the Rothschild family’s European influence, symbolising warmth and vitality.

=== The House Cup ===
Every year, each house battles to win the House Cup. During the last week of term is the concluding House Event, House Athletics. Then, on the last day of term, the winning house is announced. Now merit marks, that the pupils earn, count toward the house cup.

There are several house events, such as:

Event	Description
House Athletics	Members of each house in every year bar the Upper VI participate in track and field events.
House Dance	Members of each house in every year bar the Upper VI perform a sequence of dances in front of an audience. The dances are choreographed by House Dance Captains in the Lower VI in response to a given stimulus. External assessors judge each of the six dances and results are announced upon the conclusion final evening performance.
House Drama	A small selection of actors from each house perform a piece written by House Drama Captains in the Lower VI. The piece is based on a given stimulus and is performed in front of an audience and external judges.
House Languages	A short picture is filmed in a foreign language, written and directed by House Language Captains in the Lower VI. Each film is screened in front of and audience and is judged by a panel of both internal and external assessors.
House Hockey	A set of hockey matches between houses. Each year bar the Sixth Form produce a team of twelve girls to play.
House Swimming	A series of heats between swimmers from each house. All year groups are represented.
House Music	A theme is chosen by the House Music Captains in the Lower VI. They then arrange pieces of music to fit this theme, which are performed on two evenings and judged by an internal panel. The results are announced upon the conclusion of the final performance.
House Art	House Captains in the Lower VI design a response to a given stimulus. Occasionally, these pieces have been reproduced and formally displayed; for example, the winning design of Waddesdon House, the 'Ladder of Success' has been cast in bronze and is displayed beside the entrance to the drama studio.

The school also holds numerous minor sporting inter-house events.

House Points awarded for exemplary work also contribute, though comparatively insignificantly, to the House Cup.

A points system is then used to determine the winner of the Cup. The result is usually hotly contested in the hours after the announcement.

== Head Girls ==
The school appoints seven members of Year 13 to the positions of Head Girl and six Deputy Head Girls in a group formally known as the School Cabinet. Girls are short-listed for these roles by the nominations of members of their year group, and are subsequently elected by students, staff, and members of the senior leadership team based on maturity, behaviour, attitude, academic achievements, and contribution to school and house events. They are identified by light blue lacquer Head Girl and dark blue lacquer Deputy Head Girl badges.

== Teaching System ==
In the first three years at Aylesbury High School, girls are almost exclusively taught in their houses (with the exceptions of Maths, in which pupils are streamed by ability in years 8–9, and by their Foreign Language choice in years 8–9. Houses are also paired (Ascott with Claydon, Hughenden with Missenden and Stowe with Waddesdon) and then split up into groups of 15–20 for Design Technology lessons and Art lessons in Years 8–9.

In Year 10 and above, the year group is reshuffled into different classes for each subject depending on their GCSE options; these different GCSE choices mean they may not see others from either tutor group or form. From this point onwards, the houses play a lesser role in the day-to-day life of students but continue to organise teams for the House Cup as well as taking house assemblies and sharing a form room with other house members in their year, where students generally congregate during break time and lunch if they are not eating in the Dining Room.

In the Sixth Form, all form groups are reshuffled and divided into smaller groups. One member of staff is responsible for each of these forms and oversees their progression to university and UCAS applications. Interview advice is given by the Head of Sixth Form Mr Skinner and Deputy Head of Sixth Form Mrs Sutton.

The school is also known for offering a wide range of subjects at both GCSE and A Level.

== Academic performance ==
Aylesbury High School consistently ranks in the top 100 schools in the country for exam results. Previous rankings (2012) listed Aylesbury High School as 15th nationally and A Level Results within the top 100 selective schools (including independent schools).

== Scholarships ==
The school gives an annual travel scholarship award to honour the memory of Jane Brownlee a Head of Geography who died in service in 1998. The award is presented by her son Ben Brownlee and is awarded to a pupil in Year 13 to support travel in their gap year.

== Charity ==
The school is locally known for taking fundraising to (frequently comical) extremes – including sky-dives and 20-hour treks. On Tuesday 21 November 2006, the school broke the world record for the number of Christmas crackers pulled simultaneously. In addition to setting a new Guinness World Record of 1,217 Christmas crackers, the school pupils also raised over £2,500 in sponsorship for children's charity the NSPCC.

== The prime minister's global fellowship ==
The school has a good record of students attaining places on the prestigious Prime Minister's Global Fellowship programme. The school achieved its first student in the inaugural year of the programme, 2008, and in 2009 had 2 successful applicants.

== Notable AHS Alumni ==
=== Actresses ===
- Lynda Bellingham, actress best known for her work in British television dramas.
- Claire Foy, actress celebrated for playing Queen Elizabeth II in The Crown.

=== Journalists ===
- Emma Brockes, New York Times author noted for insightful literary journalism.
- Joanna Gosling, BBC news presenter and author of Simply Wonderwoman.

=== Athletes ===
- Anna Henderson, cyclist competing at national and international levels.
- Jo Hunter, international hockey player representing England and Great Britain .
- Zara Everitt, international netball player representing England Roses and domestically London Pulse.
- Gemma Collis-McCann, three time Paralympian competing in wheelchair fencing.
- Rowan Carroll, Olympic rower who competed in international rowing championships for Britain.
- Helena Rowland: rugby player for England in international rugby union matches.

Scientists

- Dame Anne Mills, health economist recognised for global health research contributions.

Politicians

- Doctor Sarah Woodhouse, former Liberal Democrat councillor and Brexit Remain campaigner.

Corporate

- Many alumni go on to have successful corporate careers due to the high standard of education.
