= Jane Wallace =

Jane Wallace may refer to:

- Jane Wallace (journalist), American journalist
- Jane Wallace (novelist), British novelist

== See also ==
- Jane Wallis (disambiguation)
