= Erica Sullivan =

Erica Sullivan may refer to:

- Erica James, née Sullivan, British romance novelist
- Erica Sullivan (swimmer), American swimmer
