= Sophia Bennett =

British writer

Sophia Bennett (born 1966) is a British crime novelist and children's writer. She was first published at the age of 42, and her novels have been published in more than 20 languages.

Writing as SJ Bennett, she published the first in a series of adult mysteries featuring Queen Elizabeth II as a secret amateur detective, assisted by a fictional assistant private secretary of Nigerian heritage, Captain Rozie Oshodi. Bennett was given a pre-emptive five-book deal by Bonnier Books UK, with further multi-book deals in the US, Italy, France and Germany, brokered by Charlie Campbell of Greyhound Literary agents. The Windsor Knot formed part of the resurgence of 'cosy crime' in 2020, referring to mystery novels without significant on-the-page sex and violence. It has sold 250,000 copies in the UK.

Bennett is the author of several books for young adults. Her children's novels have also been published around the world. She is the winner of the Times/Chicken House competition in 2009 for her debut novel, Threads, and the RNA Romantic Novel of the Year 2017 for Love Song. In 2019 she published The Bigger Picture, an illustrated guide for teens on contemporary and historical women artists with Tate Publishing.

== Biography ==
Bennett was born in Yorkshire and educated at London University. She has a PhD in Modern Italian Literature from Cambridge University. She has taught creative writing as a visiting lecturer for young adults at City Lit and City University in London and is a Fellow of the Royal Literary Fund.

She created a podcast for aspiring writers called Prepublished, in which she spoke to bestselling and prizewinning authors including Sophie Hannah, Jenny Colgan, Justine Picardie, Robert Muchamore, Anthony McGowan and Phil Earle about their journey to publication and their advice for fellow authors.

== Bibliography ==
=== Novels ===
- Threads (2009) (Winner, Times/Chicken House Prize 2009)
- Beads (2010)
- Stars (2011)
- The Look (2012)
- You Don't Know Me (2013) (Shortlisted for the Book Trust Best Book of the Year 2014)
- The Castle (2014) (Shortlisted for the Oxfordshire Book Award 2015)
- Love Song (2016) (Winner, RNA Goldsboro Books Romantic Novel of the Year 2017)
- Following Ophelia (2017)
- The Windsor Knot (2020)
- A Three Dog Problem (Published in the US as All the Queen's Men) (2021)
- Murder Most Royal (2022)
- A Death in Diamonds (2024)
- The Queen Who Came in from the Cold (2025)
- Death on the Royal Yacht (2026)
