= Trisha Ashley =

British writer

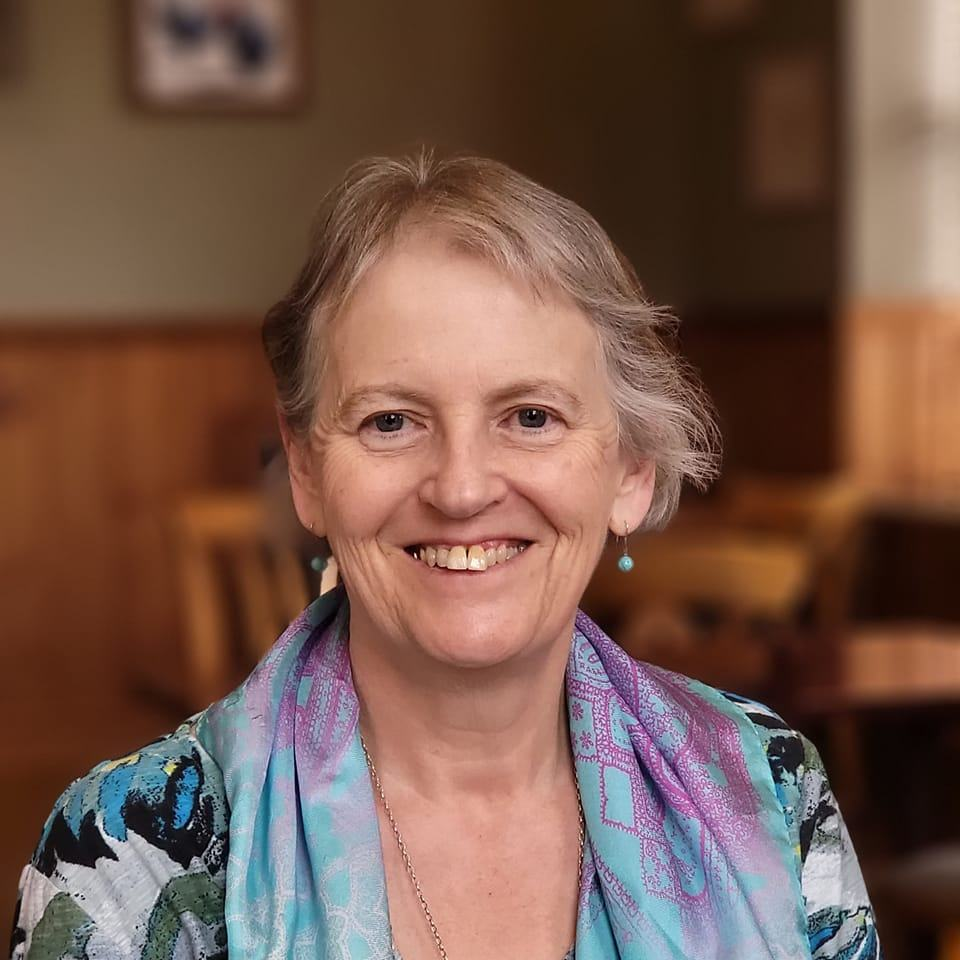
- Ashley in North Wales, 2022
- Born: 15 April St Helens, Merseyside, England
- Occupation: Writer
- Period: 2000–present
- Genre: Romance, romantic comedy, historical romance

Website
- www.trishaashley.com

Trisha Ashley is a British author of romantic fiction. She has written over 27 novels, many of them Sunday Times Bestsellers, and has also published short stories and poetry. She was nominated for The Constable Trophy for Northern Writers in the 1980s, the Melissa Nathan Award for Romantic Comedy in 2009 and 2010, and the RoNA Award for Romantic Comedy Novel in 2018 and 2021. In 2024, her novel The Wedding Dress Repair Shop won the RoNA Award for Popular Fiction. In 2010 her novel Every Woman for Herself was voted one of The Three Best Romantic Novels of the Last 50 Years by the readers of Woman's Weekly in association with the Romantic Novelists Association (RNA).

== Personal life ==
Ashley was born in St Helens, in the front room over her mother's shoe shop. She has had published poetry in the local newspaper before she reached her teens. Having failed her 11+, she attended Rivington Secondary School. Her secondary school English teacher, Miss White, encouraged her writing and arranged for her to learn to touch type, which proved increasingly invaluable over the years as her vision has steadily deteriorated.

She later studied Architectural glass at Swansea School of Art. Before turning to writing full time, she held a wide variety of part-time jobs, including working for a lead light maker and as a plumber. Ashley is divorced, with one son, and now lives in North Wales.

== Writing ==
Ashley's early novels were domestic satires, with a brief diversion into historical romance. When one of her satires (My Place in the Country, later re-written as Good Husband Material 2000) was shortlisted for The Constable Trophy for Northern Writers in the 1980s, she began, with the encouragement of her agent, Judith Murdoch, to move towards romantic comedy. Ashley has had over 20 novels published in this genre, many of them Sunday Times Bestsellers. Her first major success was with Twelve Days of Christmas (2010). Her novels have been translated into many languages including Italian, Portuguese, German and Russian. Her latest novel is The Wedding Dress Repair Shop (2023).

== Bibliography ==
=== Novels ===
- Good Husband Material (2000) (Reprinted under the same title 2013)
- The Urge to Jump (2001) (Reprinted as A Leap of Faith 2016)
- Every Woman for Herself (2002) (Reprinted under the same title 2014)
- Singled Out (2003) (Reprinted as A Good Heart is Hard to Find 2018)
- The Generous Gardener (2004) (Reprinted as Sowing Secrets) 2008)
- Sweet Nothings (2007) (Rewritten as The Magic of Christmas 2011)
- Lord Rayven's Revenge (2007) (Rewritten as The Book of Lost Stories 2025)
- Happy Endings (2008) (Reprinted as Written from the Heart 2019)
- Sowing Secrets (2008) (Reprint of The Generous Gardener 2004)
- A Winter's Tale (2008) (Reprinted under the same title 2017)
- Wedding Tiers (2009) (Reprinted under the same title 2024)
- Chocolate Wishes (2010)
- Twelve Days of Christmas (2010) (Reprinted under the same title 2017)
- The Magic of Christmas (2011) (Rewrite of Sweet Nothings 2007)
- Chocolate Shoes and Wedding Blues (2012)
- Wish Upon a Star (2013)
- Creature Comforts (2015)
- A Christmas Cracker (2015)
- A Leap of Faith (2016) (Reprint of The Urge to Jump 2001)
- The Little Teashop of Lost and Found (2017)
- A Good Heart is Hard to Find (2018) (Reprint of Singled Out 2003)
- The House of Hopes and Dreams (2018)
- Written from the Heart (2019) (Reprint of Happy Endings 2008)
- The Christmas Invitation (2019)
- The Garden of Forgotten Wishes (2020)
- One More Christmas at the Castle (2021)
- The Wedding Dress Repair Shop (2023)
- The Book of Lost Stories (2025) (Rewrite of Lord Rayven's Revenge 2007)
- A Recipe for Romance (2025) (Reprint of Chocolate Wishes 2010)
- The Christmas Retreat (2025)
- The Hilltop Hideaway (2027) (TBC)

=== Short stories ===
- Finding Mr. Rochester (2014) (E-Book short story)
- A Piece of Cake (2014) (E-Book short story)
- Footsteps in the Snow (2014) (E-Book collection of her magazine short stories etc.)
- A Vintage Christmas (2015) (E-Book short story)

=== Anthologies ===
- Loves Me, Loves Me Not (2009) (Contributed short story)
- Fabulous at Fifty (2010) (Contributed)
- They Can't Take That Away From Me (2011) (Contributed)
- Women Aloud (2011) (Contributed short story) (Audio anthology for charity (the Helena Kennedy Foundation))

== Awards ==
- 1980s – Shortlisted for The Constable Trophy for Northern Writers for My Place in the Country (Later re-written as Good Husband Material 2000)
- 2009 – Shortlisted for The Melissa Nathan Award for A Winter's Tale
- 2010 – Shortlisted for The Melissa Nathan Award for Every Woman for Herself
- 2010 – Voted one of the Top 3 Best Romantic Novels of the Last 50 Years by the readers of Woman's Weekly in conjunction with the Romantic Novelists Association (RNA) for Every Woman for Herself
- 2018 – Shortlisted for the RoNAs (RNA Awards) Romantic Comedy Novel Award for The Little Teashop of Lost and Found
- 2021 – Shortlisted for the RoNAs (RNA Awards) Romantic Comedy Novel Award for The Garden of Forgotten Wishes
- 2024 – Winner of the RoNAs (RNA Awards) Popular Romantic Fiction Award for The Wedding Dress Repair Shop

== The Trisha Ashley Award ==
The Trisha Ashley Award (TAA) was set up to encourage new writers and is an annual prize for a short story, in conjunction with Creative Writing Matters. It was awarded from 2017 to 2022.

=== TAA Winning Authors ===
- 2017 – Andrew Stiggers for Fields of Mud
- 2018 – Louise Farr for Moon Jellies
- 2019 – Ilaria Warren for Foie Gras
- 2020 – Jo Holmwood for Rock
- 2021 – Catherine Ogston for Ten Steps to Mending a Broken Heart
- 2022 – Aneeta Sundararaj for A Love Letter
