= Just Look at Me Now =

Just Look at Me Now may refer to:

- "Just Look at Me Now", Chumbawamba (1995) Swingin' with Raymond
- "Just Look at Me Now", Bachman–Turner Overdrive (1984 album)
- "Just Look at Me Now", Right-On (Charly Antolini album)
- Just Look at Me Now (2010) Nell Dixon
