= Sarah Mason (novelist) =

British novelist

- Born: 19 September 1971 (age 55)
- Occupation: novelist
- Spouse: Yes
- Children: 3
- Writing career
- Pen name: Sarah Mason
- Language: English
- Period: 2002 – present
- Genre: Romance
- Notable awards: RoNA Award

Sarah Mason (born 19 September 1971) is a British novelist of romance novels since 2002. In 2003, her debut novel Playing James won the Romantic Novel of the Year Award by the Romantic Novelists' Association.

== Biography ==
Sarah Mason was born on 19 September 1971 and she grew up near the sea in Cornwall, England. She obtained a degree in Maths from University of Bristol.

At the age of 25 she began importing gourmet popcorn from United States and selling it to everyone from Sainsbury's to Virgin cinemas and was running a company with a seven figure turnover.

When she married she sold the business on, she decided take a few months off to decide what she wanted to do next, and she started writing.

She lives in Cheltenham, Gloucestershire, with her husband, three children, and a West Highland Terrier.

== Bibliography ==
=== Colshannon Series ===
1. Playing James (2002)
2. High Society (2004) aka Society Girls (US title)

=== Single novels ===
- The Party Season (2003) aka Party Girl (US title)
- Sea Fever (2007) aka Fever (US title)
