= Jane Lovering =

British writer

- Born: 19?? Devon, England, UK
- Occupation: Novelist
- Children: 5
- Writing career
- Pen name: Jane Lovering
- Language: English
- Period: 2008 – present
- Genre: Romance
- Notable awards: RoNA Award
- Website: www.janelovering.co.uk

Jane Lovering is a British writer of romance novels since 2008. In 2012, her novel Please Don't Stop the Music won the Romantic Novel of the Year Award by the Romantic Novelists' Association. In 2018, her book, Christmas at the Little Village School, won Love Story of the Year at the Romantic Novelists' Association awards.

== Biography ==
Jane Lovering was born in Devon, England, UK, but now lives in Yorkshire with her five children. She works in a local school and also teaches creative writing.

== Bibliography ==
=== Single novels ===
- Reversing Over Liberace (2008)
- Slightly Foxed (2009)
- Please Don't Stop the Music (2011)
- Star Struck (2011)
- Hubble Bubble (2013)
- How I Wonder What You Are (2014)
- Christmas at the Little Village School (2017)

=== Otherworlders ===
1. Vampire State of Mind (2012)
2. Falling Apart (2014)
