= Countess (novel) =

1978 novel by Josephine Edgar

- First US edition
- Author: Josephine Edgar
- Language: English
- Genre: Historical romance
- Set in: Vienna, Austria 1914
- Published: 1978: Macdonald & J.(UK); St. Martin's Press (US)
- Publication place: England
- Pages: 356
- Awards: RoNA Award
- ISBN: 0-354-04305-6
- Preceded by: Duchess

Countess, sequel to Duchess, is a historical romance novel by Josephine Edgar published in 1978 by Macdonald & J. The novel won the 1979's Romantic Novel of the Year Award by the Romantic Novelists' Association.

== Plot ==
Viola Corbett lives in Vienna with her husband, Count Eugene Erhmann, their children, Therese and Lorenz, and her illegitimate son James-Carlo, until the outbreak of the First World War disrupts their lives. The story explores themes of greed, lust, hate, and romance.
