= Dorothy M. Cray =

British novelist

- Occupation: Novelist
- Writing career
- Pen name: Dorothy M. Cray, Dorothy Cray
- Language: English
- Period: 1962–1970
- Genre: romance
- Notable awards: RoNA Award

Dorothy M. Cray was a British writer of over 9 romance novels from 1962 to 1970. In 1963, her novel House Divided won the Romantic Novel of the Year Award by the Romantic Novelists' Association.

== Bibliography ==
=== As Dorothy M. Cray ===
==== Single novels ====
- Morning Waits (1962)
- House Divided (1963)
- Place for Claire (1964)

=== As Dorothy Cray ===
==== Single novels ====
- A Fountain Troubled (1965)
- House of Many Windows (1966)
- Swan's Feather (1967)
- The freedom of Ruth Cardew (1968)
- Mirror on the Wall (1969)
- Escape from Yesterday (1970)
