= Marguerite J. Gascoigne =

British writer

Marguerite Jackson Lazarus
- Born: Marguerite Jackson; 1 May 1916; Durham, England, UK
- Died: 24 September 2004 (aged 88); North Yorkshire, England, UK
- Occupations: Teacher, novelist
- Spouse: Jacob "Jack" Lazarus
- Writing career
- Pen name: Marguerite J. Gascoigne, Anna Gilbert
- Language: English
- Period: 1916–2004
- Genres: Children's fiction, romance

Marguerite Lazarus, née Jackson (born 1 May 1916 in Durham, England – d. 24 September 2004 in North Yorkshire, England) was a British writer. She started writing children's fiction as Marguerite J. Gascoigne, and later romance novels under the pseudonym of Anna Gilbert. Her novel The Look of Innocence won in 1976 the Romantic Novel of the Year Award by the Romantic Novelists' Association.

== Biography ==
Marguerite Jackson was born on 1 May 1916 in Durham, England, UK. On 1937, she obtained a BA with honours and on 1957 an MA at Durham University. She worked as Grammar school English teacher from 1938 to 1973. On 5 April 1956, she married Jacob "Jack" Lazarus.

She published Children's fiction as Marguerite J. Gascoigne, and later gothic romance novels as Anna Gilbert.

Marguerite died at 88, on 24 September 2004 in North Yorkshire, England.

== Bibliography ==
=== As Marguerite J. Gascoigne ===
==== Single novels ====
- The Song of the Gipsy (1953)

=== As Anna Gilbert ===
==== Single novels ====
- Images of Rose (1974)
- The Look of Innocence (1975)
- A Family Likeness (1977)
- Remembering Louise (1978)
- The Leavetaking (1979)
- Flowers for Lilian (1980)
- Miss Bede Is Staying (1982)
- The Long Shadow (1983)
- A Walk in the Wood (1989)
- The Wedding Guest (1993)
- Treachery of Time (1995)
- A Hint of Witchcraft (2000)
- A Morning in Eden (2001)
