= Maynah Lewis =

British novelist (1919–1988)

- Born: Maynah McIntire; 14 April 1919; Liverpool, Lancashire, England
- Died: 16 July 1988 (aged 69)
- Occupation: Novelist
- Spouse: Victor Lewis (m. 1936)
- Children: 1
- Writing career
- Language: English
- Period: 1963–83
- Genres: Gothic; romance
- Notable awards: RoNA Award

Maynah Lewis (/ˈmaɪnə/ MY-nə; née Mclntire /ˈmækɪntaɪər/ MAK-in-tire; 14 April 1919 – 16 July 1988) was a British writer of 23 gothic and romance novels. She is one of only a few authors to have won twice the Romantic Novel of the Year Award by the Romantic Novelists' Association.

== Biography ==
Born Maynah McIntire on 14 April 1919 in Liverpool, England, she was educated at schools in Scotland. In 1936, she married Victor Lewis, and had one son.

She was a professional musician and teacher, before became writing full-time from 1958. She won twice the Romantic Novel of the Year Award by the Romantic Novelists' Association, by her novels The Future is Forever in 1968, and The Pride of Innocence in 1972.

In my first novel the heroine didn't get her man, in my second the heroine was 64 years old, my third was a romantic suspense set behind the Iron Curtain, my fourth had no wedding bells, not even in the far distance.

— Maynah Lewis

Maynah Lewis died on 16 July 1988.

== Bibliography ==
- No Place for Love (1963)
- Give Me This Day (1964) aka Give Us This Day
- See the Bright Morning (1965)
- Make Way for Tomorrow (1966)
- The Long Hot Days (1966)
- The Future Is Forever (1967)
- Till Then, My Love (1968)
- Of No Fixed Abode (1968)
- Symphony for Two Players (1969)
- Corner of Eden (1970)
- The Pride of Innocence (1971)
- Too Late for Tears (1972)
- The Town That Nearly Died (1973)
- The Miracle of Lac Blanche (1973)
- The Unforgiven (1974)
- The Other Side of Paradise (1975)
- A Woman of Property (1976)
- These My Children (1977)
- Love Has Two Faces (1981)
- Barren Harvest (1981)
- Before the Darkness Falls (1981)
- Hour of the Siesta (1982)
- Whisper Who Dares (1983)
