= Anne Mills =

British authority on health economics

Emeritus Professor Dame Anne Mills DCMG CBE FRS FMedSci
- Born: 26 January 1951 (age 75)
- Education: Aylesbury High School; Oxford High School
- Alma mater: St Hilda's College, Oxford; University of Leeds; University of London
- Spouse: Patrick Corran
- Awards: Fellow of the Royal Society
- Scientific career
- Institutions: London School of Hygiene and Tropical Medicine

Dame Anne Jane Mills (born 26 January 1951) is a British authority on health economics. She is Emeritus Professor of Health Economics and Policy at the London School of Hygiene and Tropical Medicine.

== Early life and education ==
Mills was born on 26 January 1951. She was educated at Aston Clinton Primary School, Aylesbury High School, an all-girls grammar school, and at Oxford High School, an all-girls private school. She studied history and economics at St Hilda's College, Oxford, and graduated from the University of Oxford with a Bachelor of Arts (BA) degree in 1973; as per tradition, her BA was later promoted to a Master of Arts (MA (Oxon)) degree. She completed a postgraduate diploma in Health Service Studies at the University of Leeds in 1976. She undertook postgraduate research in health economics at the University of London, and completed her Doctor of Philosophy (PhD) degree in 1990.

== Research ==
Mills' major domain of research is on ways of providing efficient and equitable health care in low- and middle-income countries. Her work began in the 1980s in Nepal on the cost-effectiveness of interventions for malaria.

She was a member of the Disease Control Priorities Project. Mills was Vice-director and then Deputy Director and Provost of the London School of Hygiene and Tropical Medicine from 2011 to 2023. She became a Foreign Associate of the Institute of Medicine in 2006, President of the International Health Economics Association in 2012 and joined the Board of Health Systems Global the same year.

== Honours ==
In the 2007 New Year Honours, Mills was appointed a Commander of the Order of the British Empire (CBE) "for services to Medicine". In the 2015 New Year Honours, she was appointed Dame Commander of the Order of St Michael and St George (DCMG) "for services to international health".

In 2009, Mills was awarded the Prince Mahidol Award for Medicine in recognition of her contribution to the development of health economics and health systems research in Africa and Asia.

Mills was elected a Fellow of the Academy of Medical Sciences (FMedSci) in 2009. She was elected a Fellow of the Royal Society (FRS) in 2013.

== Personal life ==
She is married to Patrick Corran. The couple has two sons.

== Selected bibliography ==
=== Books ===
- Mills, Anne J.; Black, Robert E.; Merson, Michael (2012). Global health: diseases, programs, systems, and policies (3rd ed.). Burlington, Massachusetts: Jones & Bartlett Learning. ISBN 9780763785598.
