= Julia Wild =

British writer

Julie Vince
- Born: Royton, England
- Occupation: novelist
- Writing career
- Pen name: Julia Wild
- Language: English
- Period: 1997–2021
- Genre: Romance
- Notable work: Illusions
- Notable awards: The RNA NEW Writers Award for Dark Canvas. Love Story of the Year; 2003 Illusions

Julie Vince (pen name, Julia Wild) is a British writer from Royton, England. She is the author of seven romance novels from 1997 to 2021. The latest, in 2021 is her first historical novel

== Selected works ==
- Dark Canvas (1997) RNA New Writers Award winner
- Blue Silk Promise (1998)
- Moon Shadow (1998)
- Soul Whispers (2001)
- Secrets (2001)
- Illusions (2002) RNA Award winner
- The Secret Notebook (2021)

== Awards ==
- 2003 - Romantic Novelists' Association Love Story of the Year – Illusions
