= Audrey Howard =

English novelist (1929–2016)

- Born: 1929; Liverpool, Lancashire, England
- Died: 26 July 2016 (aged 86–87); St Annes on Sea, Lancashire, England
- Occupation: Novelist
- Writing career
- Pen name: Audrey Howard
- Language: English
- Period: 1984-Present
- Genre: Romance
- Notable awards: RoNA Award

Audrey Howard (1929 – 26 July 2016) was an English writer of historical romance novels. In 1988, her novel The Juniper Bush won the Romantic Novel of the Year Award by the Romantic Novelists' Association.

== Biography ==
Audrey Howard was born on 1929 in Liverpool, Lancashire (now Merseyside), England, and grew up in St Annes on Sea, Lancashire, where she continued to live in her childhood home throughout her adult life.

Howard worked as a hairdresser, model, shop assistant, cleaner and civil servant, before she began to write in Australia in 1981. She published her first novel in 1984.

Howard died at her St. Annes home on 26 July 2016.

== Bibliography ==
=== Single novels ===
- The Skylark's Song (1984)
- The Morning Tide (1985)
- Ambitions (1986)
- The Juniper Bush (1987)
- Between Friends (1988)
- The Mallow Years (1991)
- Shining Threads (1992)
- A Day Will Come (1992)
- All the Dear Faces (1993)
- There is no Parting (1993)
- The Woman from Browhead (1994)
- Echo of Another Time (1994)
- The Silence of Strangers(1995)
- A World of Difference (1995)
- Promises Lost (1996)
- The Shadowed Hills (1997)
- Strand of Dreams (1997)
- Tomorrows Memories (1997)
- Not a Bird Will Sing (1998)
- When Morning Comes (1998)
- Beyond the Shining Water (1999)
- Angel Meadow (1999)
- Rivers of the Heart (2000)
- The Seasons Will Pass (2000)
- A Place Called Hope (2001)
- Annie's Girl (2001)
- Whispers on the Water (2002)
- A Flower in Season (2002)
- Painted Highway (2003)
- Reflections from the Past (2003)
- Distant Images (2004)
- As the Night Ends (2005)
- Rose Alley (2006)
- A Time Like No Other (2007)
- The Long Way Home (2008)
- The Flight of Swallows (2009)
- Softly Grow the Poppies (2012)

=== Liverpool's Irish Families Saga ===
1. Ambitions (1986)
2. All the Dear Faces (1992)
3. There Is No Parting (1993)

=== Lancashire's Mill Saga ===
1. The Mallow Years (1990)
2. Shining Threads (1991)

=== Townley Saga ===
1. The Silence of Strangers (1995)
2. A World of Difference (1995)

=== Andrews Saga ===
1. Promises Lost (1996)
2. The Shadowed Hills (1996)
