= Melinda Hammond =

British writer

- Born: Bristol, England, UK
- Occupation: Novelist
- Writing career
- Pen name: Melinda Hammond, Sarah Mallory
- Language: English
- Period: 1980–present
- Genre: Romantic novel
- Notable awards: RoNA Award
- Website: www.melindahammond.com

Melinda Hammond (b. in Bristol, England) is an awarded British writer of historical and romance novels since 1980, she also uses the pseudonym of Sarah Mallory.

== Biography ==
Melinda Hammond was born in Bristol, England, UK, and grew up on Barton Hill with three older brothers. At 16, she left school to work in a variety of jobs before becoming a stay at home mum.

She started to writing when was at home with her first child. In 1980, she sold her first novel at Robert Hale. As Sarah Mallory, she writes for Harlequin/ Mills & Boon . She is also self published.

== Awards ==
- Dance for a Diamond: 2005 – The Reviewers Choice award from Singletitles.com
- Gentlemen in Question: 2006 – Historical Novel Society's Editors Choice.
- The Earl's Runaway Bride: 2010 – CataNetwork Reviewers Choice Award.
- The Dangerous Lord Darrington: 2012 – Love Story of the Year by the Romantic Novelists' Association.
- Beneath the Major's Scars: 2013 - Love Story of the Year by the Romantic Novelists' Association.
- The Night She Met the Duke 2024 - Historical Romantic Novel of the Year by the Romantic Novelists' Association.

== Bibliography ==
=== As Melinda Hammond ===
==== Single novels ====
- Fortune's Lady (1982)
- Summer Charade (1982)
- Maid of Honour (2002)
- The Bargain (2002)
- Lady Vengeance (2003)
- The Highclough Lady (2004)
- A Lady at Midnight (2005)
- Dance for a Diamond (2005)
- Gentlemen in Question (2006)
- The Belle Dames Club (2007)
- A Rational Romance (2007)
- Lucasta (2008)

==== Lagallan Brothers Series ====
1. Autumn Bride (1983)
2. The Dream Chasers (2003)

=== As Sarah Mallory ===
==== Single novels ====
- More Than a Governess (2008)
- The Wicked Baron (2009)
- Wicked Captain, Wayward Wife (2010)
- The Earl's Runaway Bride (2010)
- Disgrace and Desire (2010)
- To Catch a Husband... (2011)
- The Dangerous Lord Darrington (2011)

==== The Notorious Coale Brothers Series ====
1. Beneath the Major's Scars (2012)
2. Behind the Rake's Wicked Wager (2013)

==== Castonbury Park Multiauthor Series ====
5. The Illegitimate Montague (2012)

==== Omnibus ====
- More Than a Governess / Wicked Captain, Wayward Wife / The Earl's Runaway Bride (2010)

==== Anthologies in collaboration ====
- On Mothering Sunday (More Than a Governess / The Angel and the Outlaw) (2009) (with Kathryn Albright)
- One Snowy Regency Christmas (A Regency Christmas Carol / Snowbound With the Notorious Rake) (2011) (with Christine Merrill)
- Some Like It Wicked / Warriors in Winter / Beneath the Major's Scars (2012) (with Carole Mortimer and Michelle Willingham)
