= Brenda Jagger =

British writer

- Born: 7 September 1936; Yorkshire, England, UK
- Died: 1986 (aged 49–50)
- Occupation: Novelist
- Spouse: Phillip Jagger
- Children: Claudia Carvel, Vanessa Casatello, Alexandra Darby
- Writing career
- Pen name: Brenda Jagger
- Language: English
- Period: 1978–1986
- Genre: Romance
- Notable awards: RoNA Award

Brenda Jagger (born 9 July 1936 in Yorkshire, England – d. 1986) was a British writer of 9 historical romance novels. In 1986, her last novel A Song Twice Over won the Romantic Novel of the Year Award by the Romantic Novelists' Association.

== Biography ==
Brenda Jagger was born on 9 July 1936 in Yorkshire, England, UK. She married, and had three daughters. Before writing, she worked in Paris, France, and as a probation officer in the north of England.

She published her first novel Antonia in 1978, set in Ancient Rome, like her novel Daughter of Aphrodite. Most of her other novels are set in Victorian era Yorkshire, like her popular Barforth Trilogy.

Brenda Jagger died in 1986.

== Bibliography ==
=== Single novels ===
- Antonia (1978)
- Daughter of Aphrodite (1981)
- Days of Grace (1983)
- A Winter's Child (1984)
- A Song Twice Over (1985)
- Distant Choices (1986)

=== The Barforth Trilogy ===
1. The Clouded Hills (1980) a.k.a. Verity (US title)
2. Flint and Roses (1981) a.k.a. The Barforth Women (US title)
3. The Sleeping Sword (1982) a.k.a. An Independent Woman (US title)
- The Barforth Trilogy: The Clouded Hills / Flint and Roses / Sleeping Sword (omnibus) (1988)
