= Lucy Dillon =

British writer of romance novels

- Born: 1974 (age 51–52); Cumbria, England, UK
- Occupation: novelist.
- Writing career
- Pen name: Lucy Dillon
- Language: English
- Period: 2008–Present
- Genre: Romance
- Notable awards: RoNA Award

Lucy Dillon (born 1974) is a British writer of romance novels. In 2010, her novel Lost Dogs and Lonely Hearts won the Romantic Novel of the Year Award by the Romantic Novelists' Association. Her fifth novel, A Hundred Pieces of Me won the 2015 RoNA Award for the Best Contemporary Romantic Novel. Where the Light Gets In was shortlisted for the 2019 RoNA Best Contemporary Romantic Novel.

== Biography ==
Lucy Dillon was born in 1974 in Cumbria, England, UK. She now lives in Herefordshire.

== Bibliography ==
- The Ballroom Class (2008)
- Lost Dogs and Lonely Hearts (2009)
- Walking Back to Happiness (2010)
- The Secret of Happy Ever After (2011)
- A Hundred Pieces of Me (2014)
- One Small Act of Kindness (2015)
- All I Ever Wanted (2016)
- Where the Light Gets In (2018)
- Unexpected Lessons in Love (2019)
- After the Rain (2022)
