= June Knox-Mawer =

British writer

June Ellis Knox-Mawer
- Born: June Ellis; 10 May 1930; Wrexham, Wales, UK
- Died: 19 April 2006 (aged 75)
- Occupations: Writer, novelist, radio broadcaster
- Spouse: Ronald Knox-Mawer (1951–2007)
- Children: 2
- Writing career
- Pen name: June Knox-Mawer
- Language: English
- Period: 1961–2001
- Genre: Romance
- Notable awards: RoNA Award

June Knox-Mawer, née Ellis (10 May 1930 in Wrexham, Wales – 19 April 2006) was a British writer of non-fiction books and romance novels and a radio broadcaster. In 1992, her novel Sandstorm won the Romantic Novel of the Year Award by the Romantic Novelists' Association.

== Biography ==
Knox-Mawer was born June Ellis on 10 May 1930 in Wrexham, Wales, UK, daughter of Frank Ellis, an accountant, and was raised in rural Denbighshire. She worked on the Chester Chronicle. In 1951, she married Ronald Knox-Mawer (1925–2009), a barrister and member of the colonial judiciary; they had a son a and a daughter. The married couple lived in Arabia and Fiji, which inspired her writing. In 1972, they returned to the UK. In 1976 the Radio Times listed her as one of the presenters of Radio 4's "Woman's Hour". She died on 19 April 2006, aged 75.

== Bibliography ==
=== Non-fiction ===
- The Sultans Came to Tea (1961)
- A Gift of Islands: Living in Fiji (1965)
- A South Sea Spell (1975)
- Tales from Paradise: Memories of the British in the South Pacific (1986)
- A Ram in the Well: A Welsh Homecoming (2001)

=== Novels ===
- Marama (1972) aka Marama of the Islands
- Sandstorm (1992)
- The Shadow of Wings (1995)
