= Jane Wallis =

Jane Wallis may refer to:

- Jane Wallis Burrell (1911–1948), American intelligence officer
- Jane Wallis (witch), see Familiar spirit
- Jane Wallis (table tennis), represented Australia at the 2006 Commonwealth Games

== See also ==
- Jane Wallace (disambiguation)
