= Margaret Maddocks =

British writer (1906–1993)

- Born: Margaret Kathleen Cooper; 10 August 1906; Caversham, Oxfordshire, England, UK
- Died: 20 October 1993 (aged 87); Chichester, West Sussex, England
- Occupation: Novelist
- Spouse: Richard Maddocks (1937–1970)
- Writing career
- Language: English
- Period: 1944–1977
- Genres: Gothic, romance
- Notable awards: 4 RoNA Award

Margaret Kathleen Maddocks (née Cooper; 10 August 1906 – 20 October 1993) was a British writer of 17 gothic and romance novels. Before retiring she wrote her autobiography: An Unlessoned Girl in 1977. She is the only novelist to win four Romantic Novel of the Year Award by the Romantic Novelists' Association.

== Personal life ==
Born in Caversham, Oxfordshire (now Berkshire), Maddocks was educated at St. Helen's School, Northwood, London, Middlesex, and in Dresden, Staffordshire. In 1937, she married Richard Maddocks, who died in 1970. She died in October 1993.

== Career ==
Published since 1947 under her married name, Margaret Maddocks, she is the only novelist who has won four Romantic Novel of the Year Award by the Romantic Novelists' Association for her novels Larksbrook (1962), The Silver Answer (1965), Thea (1970), and The Moon is Square (1976).

In 1977, before retiring she published her autobiography: An Unlessoned Girl.

Any writer must find it difficult to assess her own work honestly and objectively, so I can only say that I hope my books may be considered as well-written. They appear to be popular among all age groups in the nine countries where they have been published. This is probably because the reader can believe in the characters and the plot holds the interest to the end. They tend to cheer rather than depress.

— Margaret Maddocks

== Bibliography ==
=== Novels ===
- Come Lasses and Lads (1944)
- The Quiet House (1947)
- Remembered Spring (1949)
- Fair Shines the Day (1952) aka The Open Door
- Piper's Tune (1954)
- A Summer Gone (1957)
- The Frozen Fountain (1959)
- Larksbrook (1962)
- The Green Grass (1963)
- November Tree (1964)
- The Silver Answer (1965)
- Dance Barefoot (1966)
- Fool's Enchantment (1968)
- Thea (1969)
- The Weathercock (1971)
- A View of the Sea (1973)
- The Moon is Square (1975)

=== Autobiography ===
- An Unlessoned Girl (1977)
