= More Than Friendship =

1960 novel by Mary Howard

- First edition
- Author: Mary Howard
- Language: English
- Genre: Romance
- Published: 1960 (Collins)
- Publication place: England
- Pages: 191
- Awards: RoNA Award

More Than Friendship is a contemporary romance novel by Mary Howard, published in 1960 by Collins. The novel won the 1960s Romantic Novel of the Year Award by the Romantic Novelists' Association.

== Plot ==
They belonged to different worlds; Jim's background was the industrial North, and Janet was a girl from his own class, but Tessa came from the romantic world of ballet. What change would the spotlight make in the Tessa's young life? Was it love that chained Tessa to the exotic world of ballet?
