= Elizabeth Buchan =

British novelist

Elizabeth Mary Oakleigh-Walker Buchan
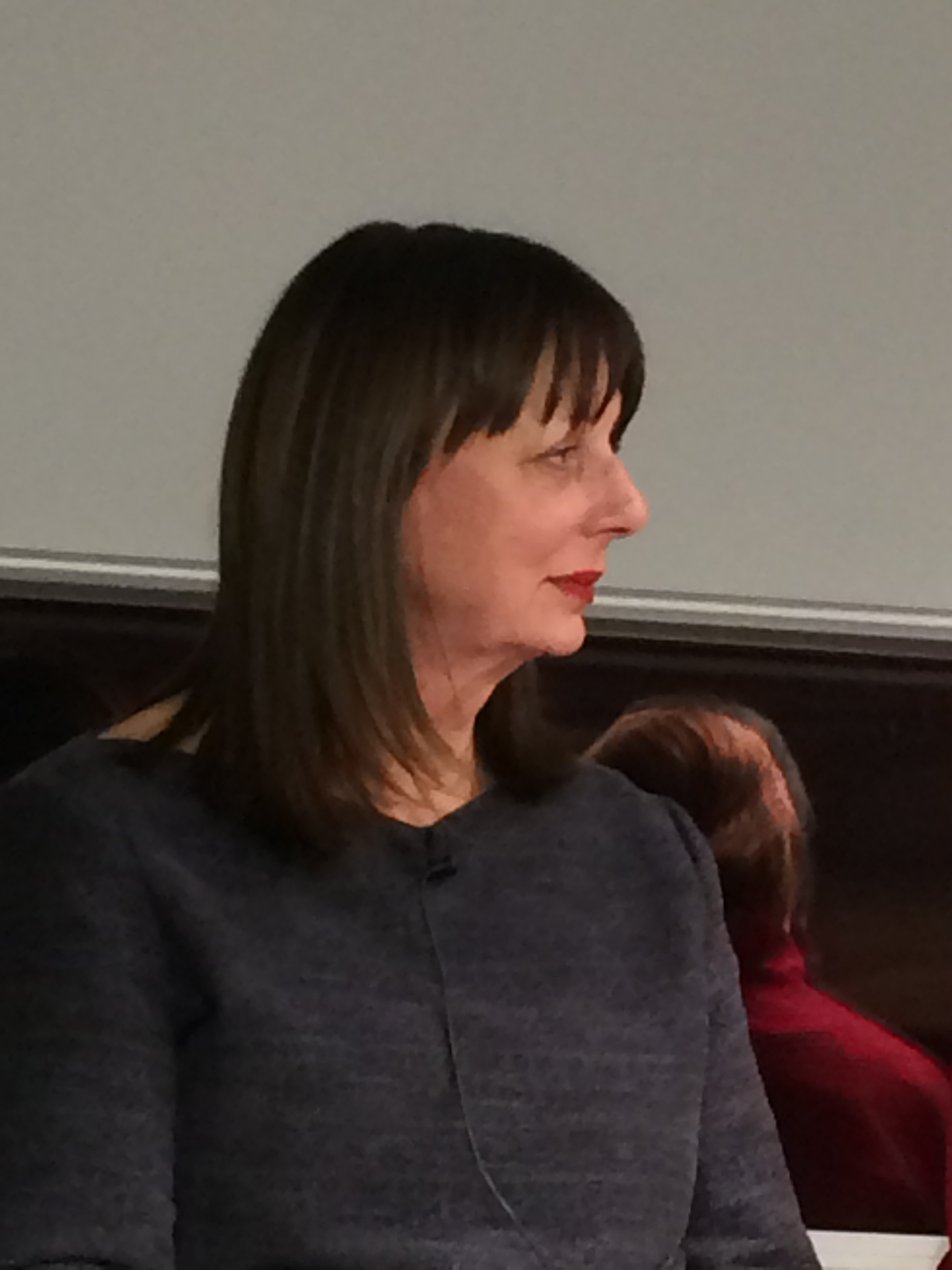
- Elizabeth Buchan at Foyle's Bookstore, London, February 2016.
- Born: Elizabeth Mary Oakleigh-Walker; 21 May 1948 (age 78); Guildford, Surrey, England, United Kingdom
- Occupations: Novelist, critic
- Spouse: Benjamin William Alastair Buchan (1974–present)
- Children: 2
- Writing career
- Pen name: Elizabeth Buchan
- Period: 1985–present
- Notable works: Consider the Lily, Revenge of the Middle Aged Woman
- Notable awards: RoNA Award
- Website: www.elizabethbuchan.com

Elizabeth Buchan, née Oakleigh-Walker (born 21 May 1948) is a British writer of non-fiction and fiction books since 1985. In 1994, her novel Consider the Lily won the Romantic Novel of the Year Award by the Romantic Novelists' Association, and she was elected its eighteenth Chairman (1995–1997). Her novel, Revenge of the Middle Aged Woman (2001), has been made into a television film for CBS.

== Biography ==
=== Personal life ===
Elizabeth Mary Oakleigh-Walker was born on 21 May 1948 in Guildford, Surrey, England, the daughter of Major Peter Oakleigh-Walker and Eleanor Mary Peters. In the 1970s, she obtained a double degree in English and History at the University of Kent at Canterbury.

On 20 April 1974, she married Benjamin William Alastair Buchan (b. 1948), grandson of the novelist and politician John Buchan. They have one son, Adam Peter Alastair Buchan (b. 1980), and a daughter, Eleanor Rose Buchan (b. 1983).

=== Writing career ===
She started working as a blurb writer for Penguin Books (1974–1989), and later, since 1989 as fiction editor at Random House. After the publication of her third novel, she became a full-time writer. She lives in London. Her short stories have been broadcast on BBC Radio 4 and published in magazines. She has been a judge for Whitbread (now Costa) Awards, and has chaired the Betty Trask and Desmond Elliot Awards and reviews for the Sunday Times. She is also a patron of the Guildford Book Festival and the National Academy of Writing.

== Bibliography ==
=== Standalone novels ===
- Daughters of the Storm (1988)
- Light of the Moon (1991)
- Consider the Lily (1993)
- Perfect Love (1995)
- Against Her Nature (1997)
- Secrets of the Heart (2000)
- The Good Wife (2003) a.k.a. The Good Wife Strikes Back (US title)
- That Certain Age (2004) a.k.a. Everything She Thought She Wanted (US title)
- Separate Beds (2010)
- Daughters (2012)
- I Can't Begin to Tell You (2014)
- The New Mrs Clifton (2016)
- The Museum of Broken Promises (2019). Corvus. ISBN 9781786495280.
- Two Women in Rome (2021). Corvus.

=== The Two Mrs Lloyd series ===
1. Revenge of the Middle-Aged Woman (2001)
2. The Second Wife (2006) a.k.a. Wives Behaving Badly (US title)

=== Poetry collections ===
- A Dashing Young Tiger Named Jack (1987) (with Scoular Anderson)

=== Game book ===
- Ice Dancer (1985)

=== Non-fiction ===
- Beatrix Potter: The Story of the Creator of Peter Rabbit (1987)
