= Frances Murray =

Scottish writer (1928–2019)

Rosemary Frances Sutherland Booth
- Born: Rosemary Frances Sutherland; February 10, 1928; Lanark, Lanarkshire, Scotland
- Died: 27 October 2019 (aged 91); Tarn, France
- Citizenship: United Kingdom
- Occupations: Teacher, novelist
- Spouse: Robert Edward Booth (1927–2011)
- Children: 3
- Writing career
- Pen name: Frances Murray
- Language: English
- Period: 1966–1986
- Genres: Children's, romance
- Notable awards: RoNA Award

Frances Murray is the pseudonym used by Rosemary Frances Booth, née Sutherland (born 10 February 1928, died 27 October 2019), a Scottish writer of children's and romance novels. In 1976, her novel The Burning Lamp won the Romantic Novel of the Year Award by the Romantic Novelists' Association.

== Biography ==
=== Personal life and teaching career ===
She was born Rosemary Frances Sutherland on 10 February 1928 in Lanark, the daughter of Frances (Wotherspoon), an artist, and Donald Sutherland, a journalist and playwright. She studied at the University of Glasgow (1945–1947), later she took a year out and worked for and toured with the Unity Theatre of Glasgow (1948–1949). On 28 August 1950 she married Robert Edward Booth, a manager, and they had three daughters: Lesley, Judith, and Frances.

In 1965, she gained an MA at the University of St Andrews, followed by a Diploma in Education in 1966. She taught history at Perth Academy, Scotland (1966–1972) and was Head of History Department at Linlathan School, Dundee (1972–1976). She was principal teacher of History at the Ladies' College, St Peter Port, Guernsey, Channel Isles (1976–1993). In 1993, she retired from teaching.

After retiring, Rosemary and her husband moved to Spain to live and then to France where she lived in the Tarn (department) until her death.

=== Writing career ===
Under the pseudonym of Frances Murray, she was published from 1966 to 1986. Since 2011, she auto-published e-books in Amazon.

Throughout her professional teaching career and her retirement, she has always written. Her novels reflect her interest in people, language, literature, art, and all things culinary. Whilst teaching in Scotland she wrote a series of radio scripts for BBC Schools Radio; and award-winning school plays for drama competitions. She was commissioned to write a Scots ballad for the novelist Mary Stewart.

== Bibliography ==
=== Children's novels ===
==== Ponies Series ====
1. Ponies on the Heather (1966)
2. Ponies and Parachutes (1975)
3. White Hope (1978)

==== Single novels ====
- Shadow Over the Islands (1986)

=== Romance novels ===
- The Dear Colleague (1972)
- The Burning Lamp (1973)
- The Heroine's Sister (1975)
- Red Rowan Berry (1976)
- Castaway (1978)
- Payment for the Piper (1983) aka Brave Kingdom (US title)
- The Belchamber Scandal (1985)

=== e-Books (Amazon Kindle) ===
- A Power to Charm (2011)
- Summer School at Labastide (2012)
- The Borrowing Days(2012)
- Shackles (2012)
- Long Road to Philadelphia (2012)
- Whatever Happened to Mary Bold (2012)
- The Coral Strand (2012)
- Expectations (2012)
