= Veronica Henry =

British writer

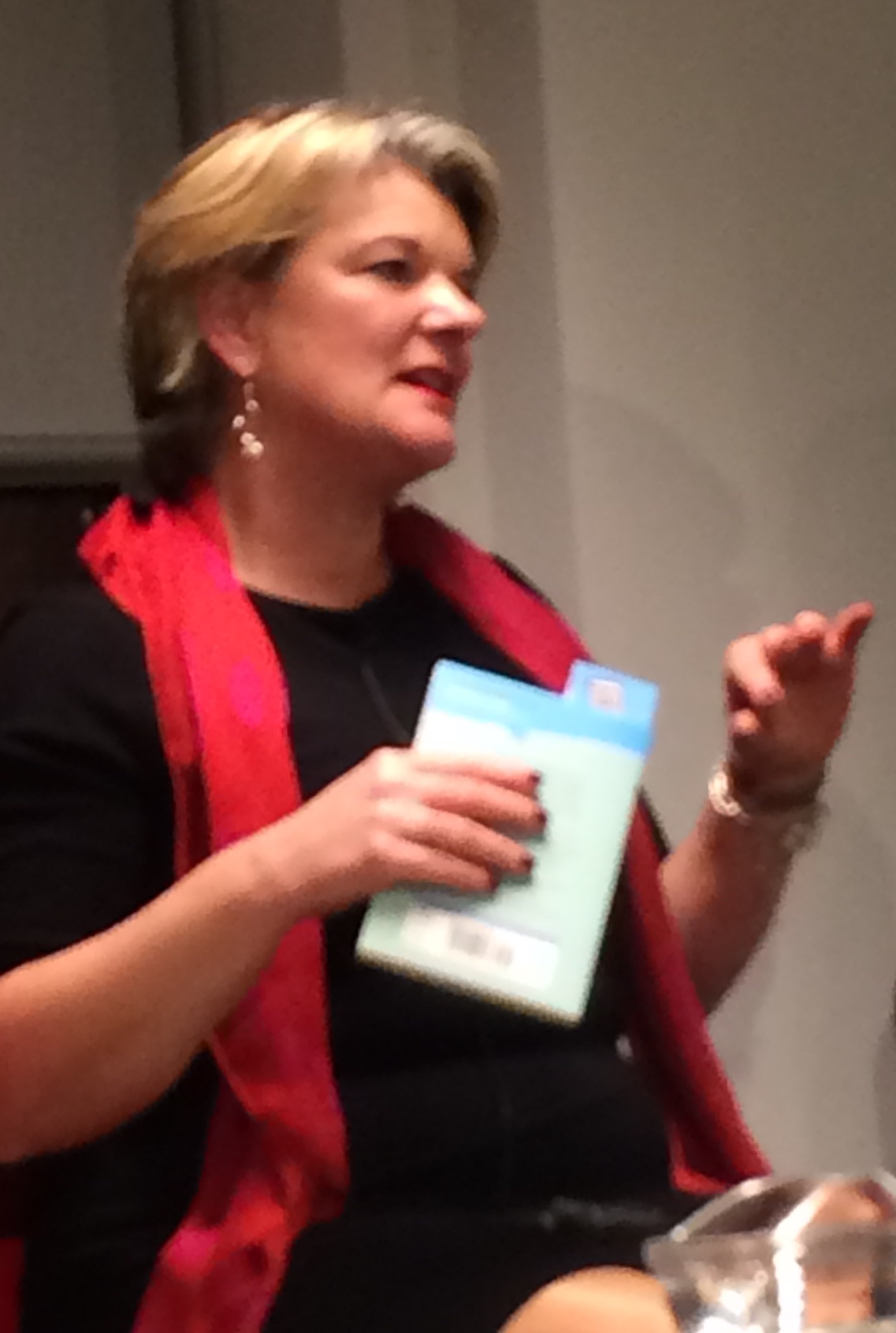
- Picture of Veronica Henry, courtesy of howaboutdave.
- Born: 1963 (age 62–63)
- Occupation: Writer
- Children: 3
- Writing career
- Pen name: Veronica Henry
- Language: English
- Period: 2002–present
- Genre: Romance
- Notable awards: RoNA Award
- Website: veronicahenry.co.uk

Veronica Henry (born 1963) is a Sunday Times bestselling British novelist, TV script writer and journalist. She has sold over 2.5 million copies of her books worldwide in 25 languages and 30 territories.

In 2014, her novel A Night on the Orient Express won the Romantic Novel of the Year Award by the Romantic Novelists' Association.

== Biography ==
Veronica Henry was educated at the Royal High School, Bath then went on to the University of Bristol to study Latin.

From there she went to the BBC to work as Production Secretary on The Archers. Her duties ranged from organising Shula Archer's wedding photographs with Patrick Lichfield to playing the part of Peaches the barmaid in the Cat and Fiddle. She also wrote scripts for the programme.

She then went to Central Television to script-edit Crossroads and Boon. She left to have her first child in 1990, and became a scriptwriter. Her credits include Boon, Heartbeat, Doctors, Family Affairs and Holby.

In 2000 she turned to writing novels, and in 2002, her first book, Honeycote, was published by Penguin Books (UK). Her other publishers include Orion Books (UK) and Random House (US). She has published over 20 bestselling novels.

On 17 March 2014, A Night on the Orient Express won Romantic Novel of the Year, and her award was presented by Darcey Bussell DBE .

She was a guest on episode 3 of season 3 of the house-hunting show Fantasy Homes by the Sea hosted by Jenni Falconer.

She has three grown up sons and lives on the coast in North Devon.

== Bibliography ==
=== The Honeycote novels ===
1. Honeycote (2002) — republished in the UK as A Country Christmas (2018)
2. Making Hay (2003) — republished in the UK as A Country Life (2018)
3. Just A Family Affair (2008) — republished in the UK as A Country Wedding (2018)

=== The Beach Hut novels ===
- The Beach Hut (2010)
- The Beach Hut Next Door (2014)
- Christmas at the Beach Hut (2018)
- A Wedding at the Beach Hut (2020)

=== Standalone novels ===
- Wild Oats (2004)
- An Eligible Bachelor (2005)
- Love on the Rocks (2006)
- Marriage And Other Games (2009)
- The Birthday Party (2010)
- The Long Weekend (2012)
- A Night on the Orient Express (2013)
- High Tide (2015)
- How to Find Love in a Bookshop (2016)
- The Forever House (2017)
- A Family Recipe (2018)
- A Home From Home (2019)
- The Impulse Purchase (2022)
- Thirty Days in Paris (2023)
- The Secret Beach (2024)

=== Novellas & short stories ===
- A Sea Change - a Quick Read (2013)
- Christmas at the Crescent – an ebook novella(2013)
- The Apple Orchard – an ebook short story (2017)
- A Day at the Beach Hut – a collection of short stories and recipes (2021)
