= Katharine Gordon =

British novelist (1915–2005)

- Born: 12 June 1915; Aberdeen, Scotland
- Died: 3 July 2005 (aged 90); Haywards Heath, West Sussex, England
- Occupation: Novelist
- Writing career
- Pen name: Katharine Gordon
- Language: English
- Period: 1978–2001
- Genre: Romance
- Notable awards: Authors' Club First Novel Award, RoNA Award

Katharine Elsie Bain Gordon (née Hogg, 12 June 1915 – 3 July 2005) was a British author who wrote eight romance novels from 1978 to 2001. For her debut novel, The Emerald Peacock, she won in 1978 the Authors' Club Best First Novel Award, and in 1979 the Romantic Novel of the Year Award of Special Merit by the Romantic Novelists' Association.

== Life and career ==
Gordon was born in Aberdeen, Scotland on 12 June 1915 to Ceylon missionary Henry Robert William Hogg and Katharine Eliza Hogg (née Henry). She started writing when she was seven years old. She moved to India at the age of seven, where she later spent much of her life. She married Donald, an English Royal Air Force pilot, in India. He left the RAF following World War II, and flew as an airline captain. Before becoming a professional writer, she worked as Secretary to E. A. Army Wardens in Nairobi, Kenya, from 1950 to 1951; as Immigration Officer at the Immigration Department in Nairobi from 1954 to 1957; and as Consular Clerk at British Embassy in Khartoum, Sudan, from 1964 to 1969.

In 1981 Gordon was dividing her time between residencies in Cyprus and Jersey. She later remarried, and died as Katharine Hornsby in Haywards Heath, West Sussex, on 3 July 2005, at the age of 90.

== Bibliography ==
=== Peacock Series ===
1. The Emerald Peacock (1978). This book tells the story of Sher Khan and Bianca.
2. Peacock in Flight (1979)
3. In the Shadow of the Peacock (1980). This book tells the story of Muna, the Rose of Madore.
4. The Peacock Ring (1981) aka The Peacock Rider. This book tells the story of Robert, the son of Muna.
5. The Peacock Fan (1996)
6. Peacock in Jeopardy (1984)

=== Single Novels ===
- Cheetah (1986)

=== Zeena Series ===
1. The Palace Garden (2000)
2. The Long Love (2001)
