= Mary Howard (novelist) =

British writer

- Born: Mary Edgar; 27 December 1907; London, England, United Kingdom
- Died: 2 March 1991 (aged 83)
- Occupation: Novelist
- Spouse: Rudolph F. Mussi
- Children: 2
- Writing career
- Pen name: Mary Howard, Josephine Edgar
- Language: English
- Period: 1930-1991
- Genre: Romance
- Notable works: More Than Friendship, Countess, Mr Rodriguez
- Notable awards: 3 RoNA Award

Mary Mussi, née Edgar (27 December 1907 – 2 March 1991), was a British writer of over 50 romance novels as Mary Howard, who also wrote over 10 gothic romance as Josephine Edgar. She is one of the two novelists to win three times the Romantic Novel of the Year Award by the Romantic Novelists' Association.

== Biography ==
=== Personal life ===
Born Mary Edgar on 27 December 1907 in London, England, United Kingdom, daughter of Jenny (Howard) and George Edgar, an author. She was educated privately. On 6 March 1934, she married Rudolph F. Mussi, they had one son, Max, and one daughter, Susan Jane. Mary Mussi died on 2 March 1991.

=== Writing career ===
Mussi started writing contemporary romance novels as Mary Howard in 1930, later she used the penname of Josephine Edgar to sign her gothic historical romances. She received three times the Romantic Novel of the Year Award by the Romantic Novelists' Association for her novels More Than Friendship (1960), Countess (1979), and Mr Rodriguez (1980). She also won the Elinor Glyn award in 1961. She was a past chairwoman of Society of Women Writers and Journalists.

== Bibliography ==
=== As Mary Howard ===
==== Single novels ====
- Windier Skies (1930)
- Dark Morality (1932)
- Partners for Playtime (1938)
- It Was Romance (1939)
- Strangers in Love (1939)
- Far Blue Horizons (1940)
- The Untamed Heart (1940)
- Devil In My Heart (1941)
- Uncharted Romance (1941)
- Tomorrow's Hero (1941)
- Reef of Dreams (1942)
- Gay Is Life (1943)
- Have Courage My Heart (1943)
- Anna Heritage (1944)
- The Wise Forget (1944)
- Family Orchestra (1945)
- The Man from Singapore (1946)
- Weave Me Some Wings (1947)
- The Clouded Moon (1948)
- Strange Paths (1948)
- There Will I Follow (1949)
- First Star (1949)
- Star-crossed (1949)
- Bow to the Storm (1950)
- Sixpence in Her Shoe (1950)
- Two Loves Have I (1950)
- The Young Lady (1950)
- Promise of Delight (1952)
- The Gate Leads Nowhere (1953)
- Sew a Fine Seam (1954) aka The Cottager's Daughter
- Fool's Haven (1954)
- Before I Kissed (1955)
- The Grafton Girls (1956)
- A Lady Fell in Love (1956)
- Shadows in the Sun (1957)
- Man of Stone (1958)
- The Intruder (1959)
- More Than Friendship (1960)
- The House of Lies (1960)
- Surgeon's Dilemma (1961)
- The Pretenders (1962)
- The Big Man (1965)
- The Interloper (1967)
- The Repeating Pattern (1967)
- The Bachelor Girls (1968)
- The Pleasure Seekers (1970) aka The Charmed Circle
- The Crystal Villa (1970)
- Home to My Country (1971)
- A Right Grand Girl (1972)
- Soldiers and Lovers (1973)
- The Young Ones (1975)
- The Spanish Summer (1977)
- Mr. Rodriguez (1979)
- For Love Or Money (1984)
- Success Story (1984)

=== As Josephine Edgar ===
==== Single novels ====
- My Sister Sophie (1964)
- The Dark Tower (1966)
- Time of Dreaming (1968)
- Dancer's Daughter (1969)
- The Devil's Innocents (1972)
- Stranger at the Gate (1973)
- The Lady of Wildersley (1975)
- Margaret Normanby (1982)
- Bright Young Things (1986)
- A Dark and Alien Rose (1991)

==== Viola's Story ====
1. Duchess (1976)
2. Countess (1978)
