= The Nanny (Nathan novel) =

2003 novel by Melissa Nathan

- Author: Melissa Nathan
- Language: English
- Genre: Novel
- Publisher: Arrow Books
- Publication date: 2003
- Publication place: United Kingdom
- Media type: Print (Paperback)
- Pages: 536 pp (paperback edition)
- ISBN: 0-09-942797-4 (paperback edition)
- Preceded by: Persuading Annie
- Followed by: The Waitress

The Nanny is a 2003 novel by Melissa Nathan. The story revolves around Jo Green, a bright but unfulfilled twenty-three-year-old nanny living in provincial England who takes a job with an upper-class family in London.

== Plot summary ==
When Jo Green takes a nannying job in London to escape her small-town routine, complicated family and perfect-on-paper boyfriend, Shaun, culture shock doesn't even begin to describe it...

Dick and Vanessa Fitzgerald are the most compatible pair since Tom and Jerry, and their children - strong and determined Cassandra, humorously protective Zak, and sweet and shy Tallulah - are downright mystifying. Whilst also having Jo on a 24/7 schedule, chasing them around to their music or ballet lessons. Suddenly village life doesn't sound too bad.

Then, just as Jo's getting the hang of their designer lifestyle, the Fitzgeralds acquire a new lodger and suddenly she's sharing her nanny flat with the distractingly good-looking but inexplicably temperamental Josh. So when Shaun turns up, things get even trickier...
