= Rosie Thomas (writer) =

British journalist and novelist

Janey Morris King
- Born: Janey Morris; 1947 (age 78–79); Denbigh, Wales, United Kingdom
- Occupation: Novelist
- Writing career
- Pen name: Rosie Thomas
- Language: English
- Period: 1982–present
- Genre: Romance
- Notable awards: Romantic Novel of the Year (1985, 2007)
- Website: rosiethomasauthor.com

Janey King (born 1947 in Denbigh, Wales) is a British journalist and romance novelist, writing under the pseudonym of Rosie Thomas. She is the author of 20 novels and ranks among the top 100 authors whose books are borrowed from United Kingdom libraries. She is a two-time winner of the Romantic Novel of the Year award.

== Biography ==
Born Janey Morris, she grew up in a north Wales village. Her mother died when she was ten years old. She was educated at Millfield and later studied at St Hilda's College, Oxford. She worked as a journalist and in publishing before undertaking full-time writing. She drew her pseudonym from her mother's name, Rose, and her sister's married name, Thomas.

She has published numerous novels since 1982, with several of them becoming top ten bestsellers. Her books deal with the common themes of love and loss.

== Awards ==
She is one of only a few authors to have twice won the Romantic Novel of the Year Award by the Romantic Novelists' Association. She won in 1985 for her third novel, Sunrise, and in 2007 for Iris and Ruby. In 2012 the Romantic Novelists' Association awarded Best Epic Romance of the Year to her 2011 novel, The Kashmir Shawl.

== Personal ==
Thomas married her husband, a literary agent, after graduating university. They had two children. After their divorce in the mid-1990s, she turned to traveling and became an avid mountaineer. On her 60th birthday, she climbed the Eiger in Switzerland. She has also competed in the Peking to Paris car rally. She lives in London.

== Bibliography ==
She has written the following works:

=== Novels ===
- Celebration (1982) (known as Love's Choice in the United States)
- Follies (1983)
- Sunrise (1984)
- The White Dove (1986)
- Strangers (1987)
- Bad Girls, Good Women (1988)
- A Woman of Our Times (1990)
- All My Sins Remembered (1991)
- Other People's Marriages (1993)
- A Simple Life (1995)
- Every Woman Knows a Secret (1996)
- Moon Island (1998)
- White (2000)
- The Potter's House (2001)
- If My Father Loved Me (2003)
- Sun at Midnight (2004)
- Iris and Ruby (2006)
- Constance (2007)
- Lovers & Newcomers (2010)
- The Kashmir Shawl (2011)
- The Illusionists (2014)
- Daughter of the House (2015)

=== Non-fiction ===
- Border Crossing: On the Road from Peking to Paris (1998)
