= Marie Joseph =

British writer

- Born: Marie Hampton Downs; 21 May 1920; Blackburn, Lancashire, England
- Died: 28 December 1996 (aged 76); Harrow, London, England
- Occupation: Novelist
- Spouse: Frank Joseph (m. 1942)
- Children: 2 daughters
- Writing career
- Pen name: Marie Joseph
- Language: English
- Period: 1960s–1992
- Genre: Romance
- Notable awards: RoNA Award

Marie Hampton Joseph (née Downs, 21 May 1920 – 28 December 1996) was a British writer of short-stories in magazines, 16 romance novels and a book about her arthritis. In 1987, her novel A Better World Than won the Romantic Novel of the Year Award by the Romantic Novelists' Association.

== Biography ==
=== Personal life ===
Joseph was born in Blackburn, Lancashire, England in May 1920 and was educated at Blackburn High School for Girls. She was in the Civil Service, before her marriage with a chartered Engineer. They had two daughters, now married, and eight grandchildren. She lived in Middlesex with her retired husband.

=== Career ===
She started to write at the age of 40, and she managed to publish in journals during the 1960s and 1970s, the stories are reedited in collection in the 1990s. Joseph published her first long romance novel in 1975. In 1976, she wrote a book about her life with arthritis. She continued publishing romance novels until 1992 and died in Harrow, London in December 1996 at the age of 76.

== Bibliography ==
=== Single novels ===
- The Guilty Party (1975)
- One Step at a Time (1976)
- Ring-a-roses (1979)
- Maggie Craig (1980)
- A Leaf in the Wind (1980)
- Emma Sparrow (1981)
- Gemini Girls (1982)
- The Listening Silence (1983)
- Lisa Logan (1984)
- Polly Pilgrim (1984)
- The Clogger's Child (1985) aka Prelude (US title)
- The Travelling Man (1989)
- Since He Went Away (1992)

=== Daisy's World ===
1. A Better World Than This (1986)
2. A World Apart (1988)

=== Collections of short stories ===
- Passing Strangers and Other Stories (1987)
- When Love Was Like That: A Collection of Short Stories (1991)
- The Way We Were: A Collection of Short Stories (1994)
- A Time to Remember: A Collection of Short Stories (1997)

=== Non-fiction ===
- Footsteps in the Park (1976)
