= List of Live episodes =

Episodes of American talk show (1988–present)

Yes	denotes that a particular segment was aired.
No	denotes that a particular segment was not aired.
- denotes a "special week" (usually a week in which the show is taken on location)
- denotes a "special episode"
- denotes a "theme week"

The daytime talk show Live with Kelly and Mark, starring Kelly Ripa and Mark Consuelos, officially debuted on April 17, 2023, but is a continuation of the series that previously co-starred Regis Philbin, Michael Strahan, and Ryan Seacrest.

Note: Although the co-hosts may have read a couple of emails during the broadcast, it does not necessarily count as an "Inbox" segment.

== Live with Regis and Kathie Lee (1988–2000) ==
Date	Co-Hosts	Host Chat	Guests/Segments
September 5, 1988	Regis Philbin & Kathie Lee Gifford	Yes	Bob Hope, Malcolm-Jamal Warner Note: The first national show in syndication.
September 6, 1988	Regis Philbin & Kathie Lee Gifford	Yes	Willard Scott, Oleg Cassini
September 7, 1988	Regis Philbin & Kathie Lee Gifford	Yes	Donald Trump, Dawnn Lewis
September 8, 1988	Regis Philbin & Kathie Lee Gifford	Yes	Theresa Russell, Debbie Gibson, Walter Hudson
September 9, 1988	Regis Philbin & Kathie Lee Gifford	Yes	Susan Lucci, Wolfgang Puck
September 12, 1988	Regis Philbin & Kathie Lee Gifford	Yes	chef Paul Prudhomme, psychic George Anderson
September 13, 1988	Regis Philbin & Kathie Lee Gifford	Yes	Morton Downey Jr., James DePaiva, Jean LeClerc
September 14, 1988	Regis Philbin & Kathie Lee Gifford	Yes	Robert Englund, Neil Sedaka
September 15, 1988	Regis Philbin & Kathie Lee Gifford	Yes	Arsenio Hall, the Moscow Circus Bears
September 16, 1988	Regis Philbin & Kathie Lee Gifford	Yes	Kitty Dukakis, Joan Rivers
September 19, 1988	Regis Philbin & Kathie Lee Gifford	Yes	Michael Crawford, Richard Simmons
September 20, 1988	Regis Philbin & Kathie Lee Gifford	Yes	Patty Hearst, Adrien Arpel
September 21, 1988	Regis Philbin & Kathie Lee Gifford	Yes	Olivia Newton-John, "Dr. Fad" Ken Hakuta
September 22, 1988	Regis Philbin & Kathie Lee Gifford	Yes	Ari Meyers, Gary Craig
September 23, 1988	Regis Philbin & Kathie Lee Gifford	Yes	Donna Mills, Bob Eubanks
