= Katharine Davies =

British writer of romance novels

- Born: 1968 (age 57–58)
- Occupation: Novelist
- Writing career
- Pen name: Katharine Davies
- Language: English
- Period: 2004-present
- Genre: Romance

Katharine Davies (born 1968) is a British writer of romance novels. For her debut novel, A Good Voyage, she won the Romantic Novel of the Year Award by Romantic Novelists' Association sponsored by FosterGrant Reading Glasses.

== Biography ==
Born in 1968, she grew up in a village in Warwickshire, England. She read English and Drama at the University of London and taught English Language and Literature in secondary schools in the United Kingdom and also Sri Lanka. After doing an MA in Creative Writing, she moved to Wales to write., and currently lives in North London.

== Bibliography ==
- A Good Voyage (2004) (titled The Madness of Love when published in the United States in 2005)
- Hush, Little Baby (2006)
