= Frances Paige =

British writer

- Born: Glasgow, Scotland, UK
- Occupation: Novelist
- Writing career
- Pen name: Jane Wallace; Jay Allerton
- Language: English
- Period: 1969–2007
- Genres: romance, historical, suspense
- Notable awards: RoNA Award

Frances Paige is a British writer of over 40 romance, historical, suspense novels from 1969 to 2007, and she has also written under the pseudonyms Jane Wallace and Jay Allerton. In 1975, her novel Vote for a Silk Gown won the Romantic Novel of the Year Award by the Romantic Novelists' Association.

== Biography ==
Frances Paige was born in Glasgow, Scotland, UK, and has lived near the Lake District, in North West England for many years. She paints and writes, and has completed over forty novels.

== Bibliography ==
=== As Jane Wallace ===
==== Single novels ====
- The Roof Garden (1969)
- The End is the Beginning (1970)
- Look, You Too Can Be a Success (1970)
- The Searchers (1971)
- For the Best of Reasons (1972)
- The Gulf (1973)
- The Dreaming Towers (1973)
- The Glass Wall (1974) aka Passions of the Mind by Frances Paige
- The Man Who Liked Couscous (1976)
- The Hidden Venus (1977)
- The Headless Doll (1978)
- Fugitive Summer (1981)

=== As Jay Allerton ===
==== Single novels ====
- Vote for a Silk Gown (1974)
- Bomber's Moon (1982)
- Mothers and Daughters (1987)
- The Silk Mill (1988)
- Moonshadows (1989)
- The Laurel Path (1990)

=== As Frances Paige ===
==== Single novels ====
- Three Girls (1983)
- Lost Time (1985)
- Blood Ties (1995)
- The Confetti Bed (1996)
- So Long at the Fair (1997)
- The Swimming Pool (1998)
- The Lonely Shore (1999)
- Love is a Stranger (2000)
- The Summer Fields (2001)
- Game to Miss Cowan (2001)
- A Day at the Races (2002)
- Bid Time Return (2003)
- Knowing One's Place (2004)
- Growing Up (2005)
- Glint of Gold (2006)
- The Learning Curve (2007)

==== McGrath Saga ====
1. The Sholtie Burn (1986)
2. Maeve's Daughter (1987)
3. The Distaff Side (1988)
4. Men Who March Away (1989)
5. The Sholtie Flyer (1990)

==== Mackintosh Sisters ====
1. The Glasgow Girls (1994)
2. The Painted Ladies (1995)
3. The Butterfly Girl (1995)
4. Kindred Spirits (1997)
