= Nell Dixon =

British writer

- Born: England, United Kingdom
- Occupation: Novelist
- Spouse: yes
- Children: 3
- Writing career
- Pen name: Nell Dixon/Helena Dixon
- Language: English
- Period: 2006-Present
- Genre: Romantic novel Detective Fiction
- Notable awards: RoNA Award
- Website: www.nelldixon.com

Nell Dixon (born in England, United Kingdom) is a British writer of romance novels since 2006. She is the only author to have twice won the Love Story of the Year by the Romantic Novelists' Association, in 2007 with Marrying Max and in 2010 with Animal Instincts with two different publishers.

== Biography ==
Nell Dixon was born in the Black Country of England, United Kingdom. Married, she had three daughters.

== Bibliography ==
=== Single novels ===
- Things to Do (2006)
- Marrying Max (2007)
- Blue Remembered Heels (2008)
- Animal Instincts (2009)
- His Darling Nurse (2009)
- Crystal Clear (2010)
- Just Look at Me Now (2010)
- Cue Me In (2010)
- Making Waves (2011)
- Dangerous to Know (2011)
- September Song (2011)
- A Cornish Christmas (2011)
- Lights, Camera, Poltergeist (2011)
- Renovation, Renovation, Renovation (2012)
- New Bay Wedding (2012)
- Easter Holiday (2012)
- Unexpected Treasure (2012)
- Radio Gaga (2013)
- Christmas Ever After (2013)
- Sophie's Choice (2014)
- Passionate Harvest (2016)
- A Chance to Heal (2016)
- The Miss Underhay series - written as Helena Dixon (2020 to present)

=== Anthologies in collaboration ===
- Brief Encounters (2011) (with Phillipa Ashley and Elizabeth Hanbury)
