= Jenny Colgan =

Scottish writer

Jenny T. Colgan
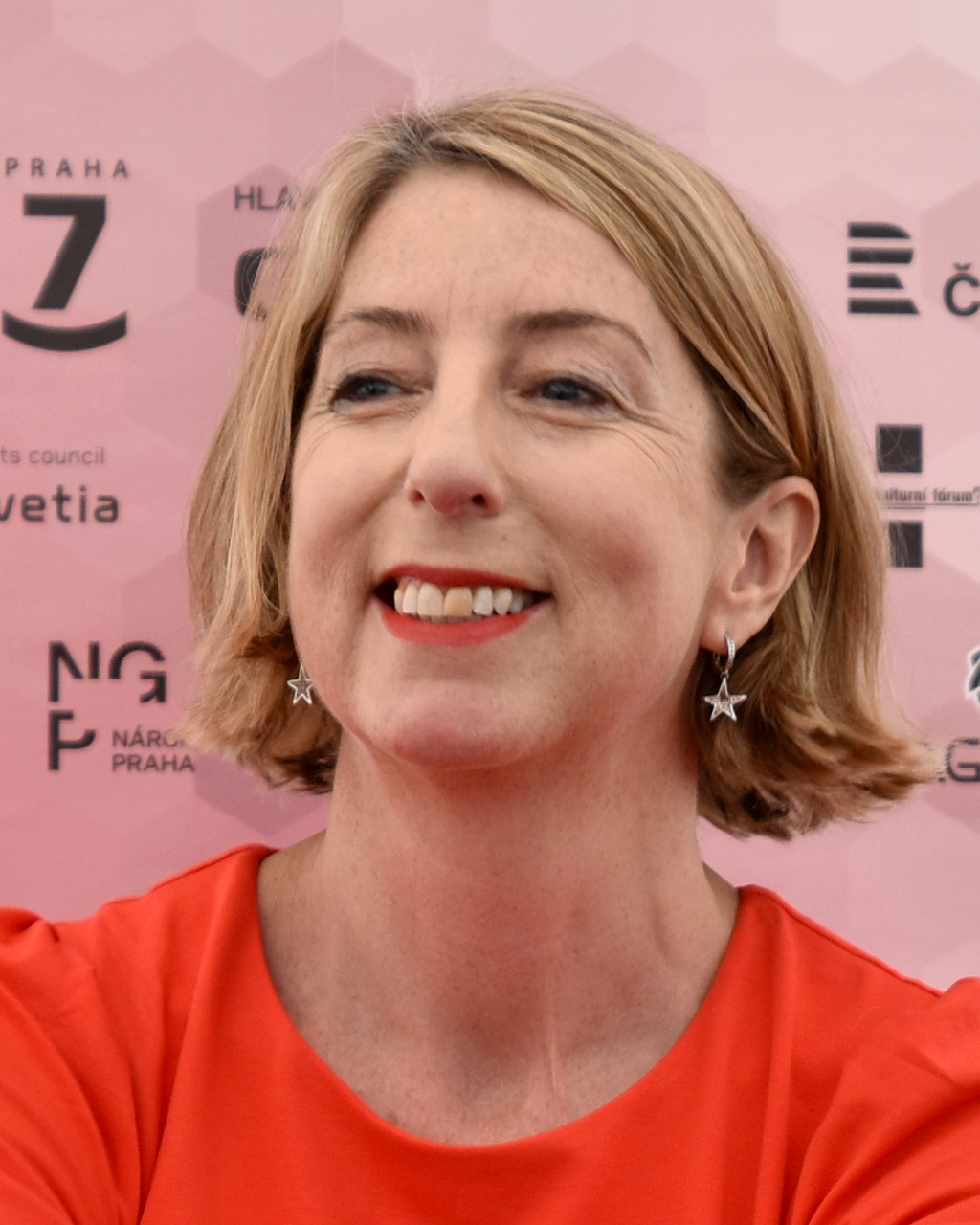
- Jenny Colgan (2024)
- Born: 14 September 1971 (age 55); Prestwick, Ayrshire, Scotland
- Education: University of Edinburgh
- Occupation: author
- Spouse: Andrew Beaton
- Children: 3
- Writing career
- Pen name: Jenny Colgan, Jane Beaton, J. T. Colgan, Jenny T. Colgan
- Language: English
- Period: 2000–present
- Genres: Romantic fiction, romantic comedy, contemporary fiction
- Notable awards: RoNA Award
- Website: www.jennycolgan.com

Jenny Colgan (born 14 September 1971, Prestwick, Ayrshire) is a Scottish writer of romantic comedy fiction and science fiction. She has written for the Doctor Who line of stories. She writes under her own name and also using the pseudonyms Jane Beaton and J. T. Colgan.

She won the Romantic Novel of the Year award in 2013 for Welcome to Rosie Hopkins' Sweetshop of Dreams and the Romantic Novelists' Association award for Comedy Novel of the Year in 2018 for The Summer Seaside Kitchen.

== Biography ==
Jenny Colgan studied at the University of Edinburgh and worked for six years in the health service.

She is married to Andrew Beaton, a marine engineer, and has three children. She splits her time between France and London.

In 2000, she published her first novel, the romantic comedy Amanda's Wedding. In 2004, one of her stories was included in Scottish Girls About Town. In 2013, her novel Welcome to Rosie Hopkins' Sweetshop of Dreams won the Romantic Novel of the Year Award by the Romantic Novelists' Association. In 2018, she won an edition of Celebrity Mastermind with a score of 21 points.

In July 2012, her Doctor Who tie-in novel, Dark Horizons, was published under the name J. T. Colgan.

== Bibliography ==
=== As Jenny Colgan ===
==== Single novels ====
- Amanda's Wedding (2000)
- Looking for Andrew McCarthy (2001)
- Talking to Addison (2001) aka My Very '90s Romance
- Working Wonders (2003) aka Arthur Project
- Do You Remember the First Time? (2004) aka The Boy I Loved Before
- Sixteen Again (2004)
- Where Have All the Boys Gone? (2005)
- West End Girls (2006)
- Operation Sunshine (2007)
- Diamonds Are a Girls Best Friend (2008)
- The Good, the Bad and the Dumped (2010)
- The Loveliest Chocolate Shop in Paris (2013)
- Working Wonders (2013)
- The Secret Christmas Library (2025)

==== The Christmas Bookshop ====
- The Christmas Bookshop (2021)
- Midnight at the Christmas Bookshop (2023)

==== The Little Beach Street Bakery ====
1. Little Beach Street Bakery (2014)
2. Summer at Little Beach Street Bakery (2015)
3. Christmas at Little Beach Street Bakery (2016)
4. Sunrise by the Sea (2021)

==== Cupcake Café ====
1. Meet Me at the Cupcake Café (2011)
2. Christmas at the Cupcake Café (2012)

==== Polly ====
1. Polly and the Puffin (2015)
2. The Stormy Day (2016)
3. The New Friend (2017)
4. The Happy Christmas (2017)

==== Rosie Hopkins' Sweet Shop ====
1. Welcome to Rosie Hopkins' Sweet Shop of Dreams (2012)
2. Christmas at Rosie Hopkins' Sweet Shop (2013)
3. The Christmas Surprise (2014)

==== Kirrinfief Series ====
1. The Bookshop on the Corner (2016) aka The Little Shop of Happy-Ever-After
2. The Bookshop on the Shore (2019)
3. 500 Miles from You (2020)

==== Mure ====
1. A Very Distant Shore (prequel, 2017)
2. The Café by the Sea (2016) published in paperback as The Summer Seaside Kitchen (2017)
3. The Endless Beach (2018)
4. Christmas on the Island (2018) aka An Island Christmas
5. Christmas at the Island Hotel (2020)
6. An Island Wedding (2022)

==== School by the Sea ====
1. Welcome to the School by the Sea (2022)
2. Rules at the School by the Sea (2022)
3. Lessons at the School by the Sea (2023)
4. Studies at the School by the Sea (2024)

==== Carso ====
1. The Summer Skies (2023)
2. Close Knit (2024)
3. Meet Me At Seaside Cottages (2025)

=== As Jane Beaton ===
==== Maggie, a Teacher in Turmoil ====
1. Class: Welcome to the Little School by the Sea (2008)
2. Rules: Things are Changing at the Little School by the Sea (2010)
3. Lessons (3 part serialization)

=== As J. T. Colgan/Jenny T. Colgan ===
- Resistance Is Futile (2015)
- Spandex and the City (2017)

==== Doctor Who ====
- Dark Horizons (2012)
- Into the Nowhere (2014)
- In the Blood (2016)
- The Christmas Invasion (2018)
- The Triple Knife and Other Doctor Who Stories (2018)
- Star Tales (2019)
