= Erica James =

British romance novelist (born 1960)

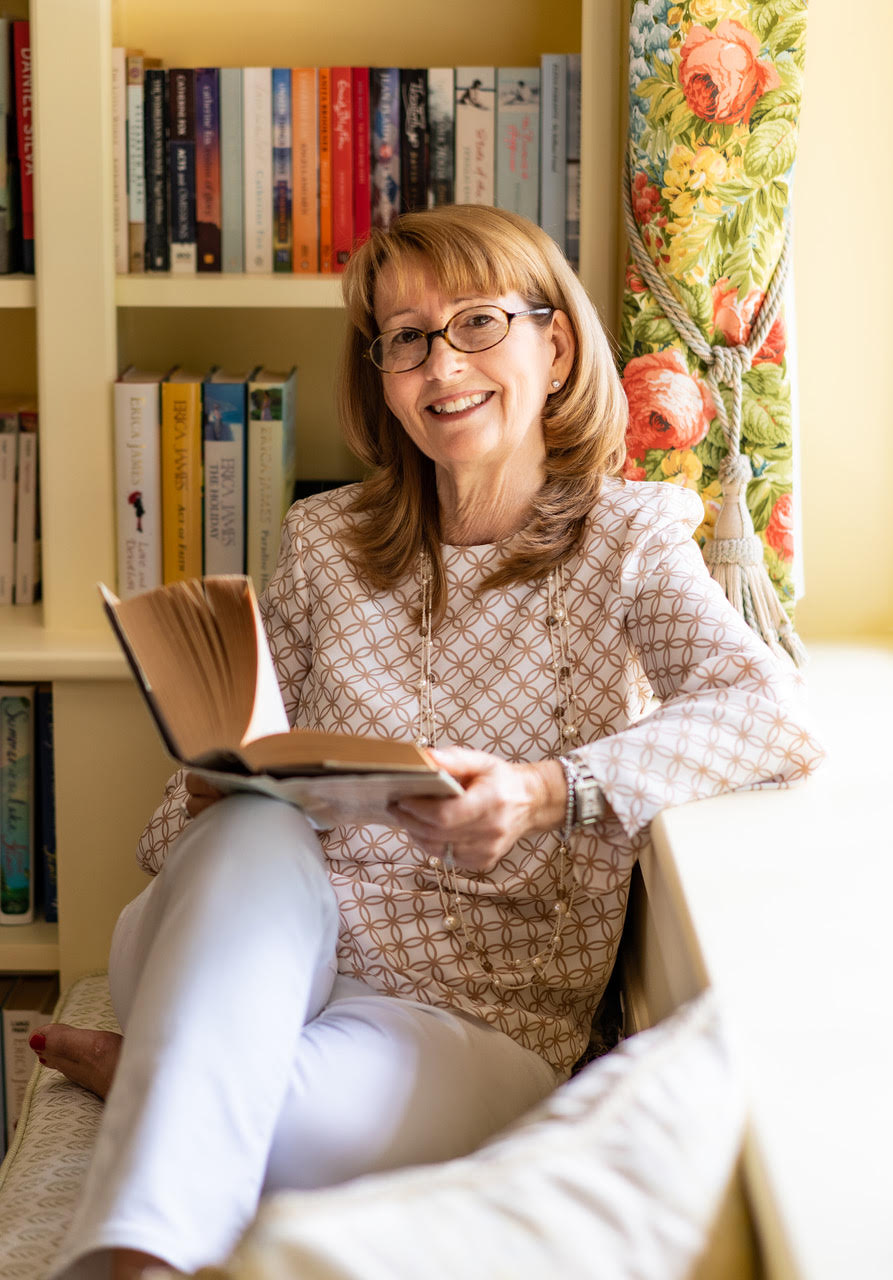
- Born: 1960 (age 65–66); Surrey, England
- Occupation: Novelist
- Spouse: Divorced
- Children: 2
- Writing career
- Language: English
- Period: since 1996
- Genre: Romance
- Notable awards: RoNA Award
- Website: ericajames.co.uk

Erica James (born 1960) is a British writer of twenty-four best-selling romance novels. In 2006, her novel Gardens of Delight won the Romantic Novel of the Year Award from the Romantic Novelists' Association., having been short-listed four times previously.

James has an international following and has been translated into thirteen languages, with the Norwegian edition of Summer at the Lake, ‘Alt i et Oyeblikk’, being recognized as a No.1 bestseller in Norway.

== Biography ==
Born in 1960 in Surrey, England, she grew up on Hayling Island, Hampshire. Currently divorced, she has two grown-up sons, Edward and Samuel, and two grandchildren. She lives in Suffolk.

She began writing after attending a creative writing course with the Arvon Foundation and had her first novel, ‘A Breath of Fresh Air’ published in 1996, reaching the Sunday Times bestseller list on the same year.

As of 2022, she has sold in excess of five million copies of her novels.

== Bibliography ==
Titles at Fantastic Fiction (UK):

=== Single novels ===
- A Breath of Fresh Air (1996)
- Time for a Change (1997)
- Airs and Graces (1997)
- A Sense of Belonging (1998)
- Act of Faith (1999)
- The Holiday (2000)
- Precious Time (2001)
- Hidden Talents (2002)
- Paradise House (2003)
- Love and Devotion (2004)
- Gardens of Delight (2005)
- Tell It to the Skies (2007)
- It's the Little Things (2008)
- The Queen of New Beginnings (2010)
- Promises, Promises (2010)
- The Real Katie Lavender (2011)
- The Hidden Cottage (2013)
- Summer at the Lake (2014)
- The Dandelion Years (2015)
- Song of the Skylark (2016)
- Coming Home to Island House (2018)
- Swallowtail Summer (2019)
- Letters from the Past (2020)
- Mothers and Daughters (2022)
- A Secret Garden Affair (2023)

=== Anthologies in collaboration ===
- What A Woman Wants (2006) (with Donna Hay and Maureen Lee)
