= Yorkshire Society =

Cultural association in England

The Yorkshire Society is a non-political organisation founded in December 1980 by Mr Barry Whittaker and Councillor for the West Riding David Daniel. It extended the philosophies of an earlier Yorkshire Society which, in 1818, wished to encourage people born, working or living in the County of Yorkshire to join and then help improve several aspects of the area, including the social welfare of its people as well as Yorkshire's physical environment. Traditionally, the patron of the Yorkshire Society is the Duke of York, and its current Chairman is Sir Rodney Walker.

== History ==
Earlier Societies of the same name included the organisation which ran the Yorkshire Society's Schools on Westminster Road in London. The Yorkshire Society referenced in 1818 was headed by wealthy Yorkshire gentry who were keen to provide charity to the working class and poor throughout much of Yorkshire. As is the case today, the organisation's patron was the Duke of York.

The Yorkshire Society founded in 1980 was founded by Mr Barry Whittaker & Councillor for the West Riding David Daniel.

== Goals ==
Although there has long been an implication that the organisation is embedded with wealthy "Society" members, its membership is open to all who are interested in the following:

- To improve the beauty, attraction and amenities in the Yorkshire countryside, towns, villages, historic houses and monuments of all kinds by encouraging and assisting local branches of the Society to prepare, fund and carry through projects in their own areas.
- Working with other established organisations in their efforts to generate and promote tourism in the County.
- Supporting efforts to study and solve some of the industrial, commercial and unemployment problems in the area.
- Drawing together in fellowship Yorkshire folk by mounting regional and local events and providing a forum for discussion and debate.

== Charitable works ==
The Yorkshire Awards, held in Autumn each year, generate substantial funds for many charities.

The Society co-sponsors the annual Yorkshire Awards alongside Yorkshire Television, Joshua Tetley, Asda, Aon, Bain Hogg, Yorkshire Electricity and the Yorkshire Bank.

The Society's award category is the Yorkshire Lifetime Achievement Award. To date recipients have included Lawrence Batley, Ken Morrison, Victor Watson, Lord Harewood, Roy Mason, Baron Mason of Barnsley, Professor Tom Kilburn, Brian Rix, Lord Rix, Michael Parkinson, Barry Cryer, Brian Turner and Ashley Jackson.

== Commemorating Yorkshire History ==
The erecting of Yorkshire Rose plaques to mark the contributions of famous Yorkshire men and women.

To date plaques have commemorated:

- Percy Shaw, inventor of cats eyes
- Thomas Spencer, joint founder of Marks & Spencer
- Henry Moore, Sculptor
- Christopher Saxton, Cartographer to Queen Elizabeth I of England
- The former Lord St. Oswald, first ever Vice President of the Society
- Colonel North, for granting Kirkstall Abbey and grounds to the people
- H. H. Asquith, former Prime Minister
- Sir Donald Bailey, inventor of the Bailey bridge
- Herbert Smith, aircraft designer
- Benjamin Latrobe, architect of the United States Capitol, Washington DC
- Harold Wilson, Baron Wilson of Rievaulx, former Prime Minister
- Benjamin Shaw, textile manufacturer
- Sir Martin Frobisher, explorer
- Kit Calvert, "saviour of Wensleydale cheese" (turned the Wensleydale Creamery at Hawes into a farmers' cooperative when it was threatened with closure in the 1930s)
- Mary Ward, an English Roman Catholic nun who founded the Institute of the Blessed Virgin Mary, also known as the Sisters of Loreto.

Acting as host for the annual Yorkshire History Awards.

== Yorkshire Day ==
The Yorkshire Society also convenes the civic celebration of Yorkshire Day, which is held on 1 August each year.
