= Seána Talbot =

Northern Irish romance writer and charity administrator

Seána Talbot is an Irish charity administrator and romance writer from County Down, using the pen names Catherine Tinley and Seána Tinley. She was president of the British charity National Childbirth Trust (NCT) from 2015 to 2019. Talbot has held various health management posts in Northern Ireland, and is the Northern Ireland Country Director of the charity Parkinsons UK. She has written fifteen romantic novels, and is the chair of the Romantic Novelists' Association (RNA). She is a volunteer with Down GAA and was part of the team which developed Down GAA TV, receiving a Civic Award from Newry & Mourne District Council for her voluntary work broadcasting Down GAA games in the early days of match streaming.

== Life ==
Seána Talbot is a charity administrator and romance writer. She qualified in speech and language therapy, and then worked as a therapist and in management in the NHS. In 2014, Talbot was appointed as non-executive director on the board of the Patient and Client Council. She is former president of the British charity National Childbirth Trust (NCT). Talbot became a member of NCT in 1995. She was elected as a trustee in 2009 and subsequently as President in September 2015, at the annual general meeting. She was reelected for a second term, but resigned in 2019 after differences of opinion about the broadening of the charity's scope.She managed the Belfast Health and Social Care Trust maternity and neonatology service from February 2020 until March 2024, through the covid pandemic. In 2024 she was appointed to the role of the Northern Ireland Country Director of the charity Parkinsons UK. She was elected to the board of the Romantic Novelists Association in July 2022, and appointed as its chair on 18 August 2024. She is married with three adult children.

== Writing ==
As at January 2026 Talbot has written fifteen romantic novels under the pen name Catherine Tinley, and one as Seána Tinley. She was elected chair of the Romance Novelists' Association in August 2024.

In 2018 she was awarded the Rita® Award by the Romance Writers of America for her debut novel Waltzing with the Earl. She was awarded the RNA’s Goldsboro Books Historical Romantic Novel Award in 2021, for novel Rags-to-Riches Wife, and their Historical Romantic Novel Award in 2022 for A Waltz with the Outspoken Governess.
