= Morag Prunty =

Magazine editor and author, writes as Kate Kerrigan

- Born: 14 April 1964; Scotland
- Other names: Kate Kerrigan
- Website: http://katekerriganauthor.blogspot.com/

Morag Prunty (born 14 April 1964), is a magazine editor and New York Times bestselling author who also writes as Kate Kerrigan.

== Biography ==
Morag Prunty was born in Scotland, of Irish parents. She had three siblings. She grew up in London from the age of two. She left school at 15 and became a hairdresser. At nineteen she began working as a magazine writer. She worked in Looks where she was the youngest editor on a national British publication. She also worked in More and Just Seventeen.

In 1991 Prunty moved to Dublin to take over the relaunch of Irish Tatler.

She lived in Dublin with her husband, Niall Kerrigan, with whom she has two sons. They bought a house in Killala, County Mayo. Prunty suffers with arthritis.

== Bibliography ==
- Boys: A User's Guide, illustrated by Alison Everitt, Piccadilly (London, England), 1993.
- Dancing with Mules, Pan (London, England), 2001, published as Wild Cats and Colleens, HarperCollins (New York, NY), 2001.
- Disco Daddy, Pan (London, England), 2002.
- Poison Arrows, Pan (London, England), 2003.
- Superstar Lovers, Tivoli (Dublin, Ireland), 2004.
- Recipes for a Perfect Marriage, Hyperion (New York, NY), 2006
