= Sarah Woodhouse =

British writer

- Born: 1950 (age 75–76); Birmingham, England, UK
- Occupation: Novelist
- Writing career
- Pen name: Sarah Woodhouse
- Language: English
- Period: 1984–2000
- Genre: Romance
- Notable awards: RoNA Award

Sarah Woodhouse (born 1950 in Birmingham, England) is a British writer. In 1989, her novel The Peacock's Feather was awarded the Romantic Novel of the Year Award by the Romantic Novelists' Association.

== Biography ==
Woodhouse was born in 1950 in Birmingham, England, UK. She grew up in Cambridgeshire and attended St Mary's convent school, before studying for a Bachelor of Arts in English Language and Literature at Reading University. In the mid-1970s, she moved to Norfolk and began to work on longer fiction, which culminated – in 1984 – with the publication of A Season of Mists, her first novel.

Woodhouse is the author of numerous short-stories, many of which were published in 19 magazine in the 1970s, and 9 novels, published between 1984 and 2000.

== Bibliography ==
=== Ann of Norfolk Saga ===
1. A Season of Mists (1984)
2. The Peacock's Feather (1988)
3. The Native Air (1990)

=== Single novels ===
- The Indian Widow (1985)
- Daughter of the Sea (1986)
- Enchanted Ground (1993)
- Meeting Lily (1994)
- Other Lives (1996)
- My Summer with Julia (2000)
