= Christina Courtenay =

British-Swedish novelist

Pia Tapper Fenton
- Born: Pia Tapper; England, United Kingdom
- Occupation: Novelist
- Spouse: Mr. Fenton
- Children: 2
- Writing career
- Pen name: Christina Courtenay
- Language: English
- Period: 2009-Present
- Genre: Romance
- Website: www.christinacourtenay.com

Christina Courtenay is the pseudonym used by Pia Tapper Fenton (b. England), a British-Swedish writer of romance novels since 2009. She was elected the twenty-sixth Chairman (2013–2015) of the Romantic Novelists' Association.

== Biography ==
Pia Tapper was born in England, United Kingdom, daughter of an English father and a Swedish mother. She grew up in Sweden. At 16, her family moved to Tokyo, Japan. Now, she lives between London and Herefordshire. She is married with two children.

== Bibliography ==
=== Single novels ===
- Marry in Haste (2009)
- Once Bitten, Twice Shy (2010)
- Desperate Remedies (2011)
- Never Too Late (2011)
- New England Rocks (2013)
- The Velvet Cloak of Moonlight (2016)
- Echoes of the Runes (2020)
- Runes of Destiny (2020)
- Whispers of the Runes (2021)
- Tempted by the Runes (2021)
- Hidden in the Mist (2022)

=== Kinross Saga ===
1. Trade Winds (2010)
2. Highland Storms (2011)
3. Monsoon Mists (2014)

=== Kumashiro Saga ===
1. The Scarlet Kimono (2011)
2. The Gilded Fan (2012)
3. The Jade Lioness (2015)

=== Shadows from the Past Serie ===
1. The Silent Touch of Shadows (2012)
2. The Secret Kiss of Darkness (2014)
3. The Soft Whisper of Dreams (2015)
