= Anne Richelieu Lamb =

Scottish feminist writer

Anne Richelieu Lamb (1807–1878) was a Scottish feminist writer.

== Biography ==
Lamb was born in Midlothian, to Elizabeth (Hutchinson) and Alexander Lamb in 1807. On 23 June 1828, at the age of twenty-one, she married John Dryden at the North Leith Parish Church. Lamb did not take the name Dryden nor did the couple have any children.

The family name Richley is an English variation of the French surname Richelieu. Nearly all the bearers of this name reside in the English counties along the southeast corner of the border with Scotland.

In 1844, Lamb anonymously published her book Can Women Regenerate Society? The book is an outreach towards middle and upper-class women, the ones who had never seen their world outside the domestic sphere. Lamb's authorship is known today; however, her name is listed as Anne Richelieu Lamb Dryden. Due to the coverture (often spelled couverture) laws in place, Anne needed John to enter into her publishing contract on her behalf, because legally a married woman was subordinate to her husband, therefore the publishing company Harrison and Co., Printers required John's name alongside her own.

Feminist scholars believe Lamb also wrote several essays in the magazine English Woman’s Journal under her initials A.R.L.

== Selected works ==
- Can Women Regenerate Society?, 1844
