= Anne Rundle =

British novelist

Anne Lamb Rundle
- Born: Anne Lamb; 1920; Berwick-on-Tweed, Northumberland, England, UK
- Died: 1989 (aged 68–69)
- Occupation: Novelist
- Spouse: Edwin Charles Rundle
- Children: 3
- Writing career
- Pen name: Joanne Marshall; Marianne Lamont; Alexandra Manners; Jeanne Sanders; Georgianna Bell
- Period: 1967–1986
- Genres: Gothic and romantic fiction
- Notable awards: RoNA Award

Anne Rundle (née Lamb; 30 May 1920 – 31 Jan 1989) was a British author of more than 40 gothic and romance novels. She also used the pseudonyms of Joanne Marshall, Marianne Lamont, Alexandra Manners, Jeanne Sanders, and Georgianna Bell. She won the Netta Muskett Award for new writers, and is one of only a few authors to have won twice the Romantic Novel of the Year Award by the Romantic Novelists' Association.

== Biography ==
=== Personal life ===
Rundle was born in 1920 in Berwick-on-Tweed, Northumberland, the daughter of Annie Sanderson and George Manners Lamb, a soldier. She was educated at Army Schools, and attended Berwick High School for Girls.

On 1 October 1949, she married Edwin Charles Rundle. They had one daughter, Anne, and two sons, James and Iain. Anne Rundle died in 1989.

=== Career and works ===
She worked as civil servant on Newcastle upon Tyne from 1942 to 1950. When she published her first novel in 1967, she won the Netta Muskett Award for new writers. She won twice the Romantic Novel of the Year Award by the Romantic Novelists' Association for her novels Cat on a Broomstick (1970) and Flower of Silence (1971). In 1974, she was named Daughter of Mark Twain.

== Published books ==
=== As Anne Rundle ===
Novels

- The Moon Marriage (1967)
- Sword Light (1968)
- Dragonscale (1969)
- Forest of Fear (1969)
- Tamlane (1970)
- Rakehell (1970)
- Amberwood (1972)
- Lost Lotus (1972)
- Heronbrook (1975)
- Judith Lammeter (1976)
- Grey Ghyll (1978)
- Moonbranches (1986)

=== As Joanne Marshall ===
Novels

- Cuckoo at Candlemas (1968)
- Cat on a Broomstick (1969)
- Dreaming Tower (1970)
- Flower of Silence (1970)
- Babylon Was Dust (1971)
- Wild Boar Wood (1972)
- Trellised Walk (1973)
- Sea-Song (1973)
- Follow a Shadow (1974)
- Valley of the Tall Chimneys (1975)
- Last Act (1976)
- The Peacock Bed (1978)

=== As Marianne Lamont ===
Novels

- Dark Changeling (1970)
- Green Grass Moon (1970)
- Bitter Bride-Bed (1971)
- Follow a Shadow (1974)
- Nine Moons Wasted (1976)
- Horns of the Moon (1979)
- A Serpent's Tooth (1983)

=== As Alexandra Manners ===
Novels

- The Stone Maiden (1973)
- Candles in the Wood (1974)
- The Singing Swans (1975)
- Sable Hunter (1977) aka Cardigan Square
- The White Moths (1970) aka Wildford's Daughter
- Island series
1. Echoing Yesterday (1983)
2. Karran Kinrade (1983)
3. The Red Bird (1984)
4. The Gaming House (1984)

=== As Jeanne Sanders ===
Novels

- Spindrift (1974)
- The Winds of Time (1986)

=== As Georgianna Bell ===
Novels

- Passionate Jade (1979)
