= Adrien Arpel =

American cosmetics entrepreneur (born 1941)

Adrien Arpel (born July 15, 1941), also known as Adrienne Newman, is an American cosmetics and skincare industrialist, whose business has specialized in product knowledge for salespeople as well as customers.

She was born as Adrien Joachim in Jersey City, New Jersey.

Her business model with Adrien Arpel, Inc. and its hundreds of shops in North America has been very profitable, and she was hailed as an industry legend by Bloomingdale's in 1987. She has also stressed the importance of honesty and happiness since she started her business in 1959 with earnings from baby-sitting. After finishing high school that year, Arpel studied at Pace University. When she launched her business she considered face make-up to be magical, but was unimpressed, more realistically, by ignorance and conflicting advice from salespeople. Her ideas for the business included licensed cosmetologists in salons of comfort. The makeover was a concept she pioneered, as well as on-site treatments in department stores such as Macy's and Bloomingdale's. She was successful in offering clients to try her own brands before purchasing them and in educating them about the details of whatever they bought, while her husband (who died in 2015) did well with a display business of his own. She is the author of several books. Her alma mater Pace University praised her in 1988 for representing the university's ideals and mission. As of 1992 Arpel was a popular vendor of make-up and jewelry for HSN as Signature Club A by Adrienne. She has also made statements about the importance of family in Judaism.

Books by Arpel have been best-sellers leading to interviews and appearances all over the USA about them and the $10‐million business she built up. By 1985, her business was one of the world's largest in its field, and she could afford to promote her less expensive do-it-yourself make-up solutions for home use. By 2005 her business was called an empire and she its face. Arpel has also been called legendary in aesthetics, her very thorough research about the desires and needs of women, relating to cosmetics, having become notable.

Arpel married Ronald Monroe Newman in 1960. Her mother Ada Stark was of Polish heritage. Her father was Samuel Joachim, whose ancestors were Russian. He gave her the $400 that enabled her to open her first small shop in Englewood, New Jersey. She has one daughter by Newman.

A longtime winter resident of West Palm Beach, Florida, and supporter there of HOW (Hearing the Ovarian Cancer Whisper), Arpel has been honored by the Monègasque royal family and by IBM. She bought her oceanfront Florida home for $5.2 million in 2001 and sold it 20 years later for over $25 million. She also listed her mansion in Southampton, New York, for $38 million in 2018. Her parent company called Alfin had been subjected to a take-over in 1996.

== Bibliography ==
Books by this author are:

- Adrien Arpel & Ronnie Sue Ebenstein: Adrien Arpel's Three week crash makeover/shapeover beauty program, Rawson Associates, New York 1977 ISBN 9780892560332
- Adrien Arpel & Ronnie Sue Ebenstein: How to Look Ten Years Younger, Warner Books, New York 1981 ISBN 9780446978460
- Adrien Arpel & Ronnie Sue Ebenstein: Adrien Arpel's 851 fast beauty fixes and facts : the first collection of beauty shortcuts, tips, and tricks you can do in as little as three minutes, Putnam, New York 1985 ISBN 9780399130168
- Adrien Arpel & Isolde Arpel Seitler: Best of Adrien Arpel: Beauty Advice, Home Remedies, and Tips, Endeavor Group, Beverly Hills 1996 ISBN 9781873913086
