= Melissa Nathan =

English romance writer (1968–2006)

- Born: 13 June 1968; Hertfordshire, England
- Died: 7 April 2006 (aged 37)
- Education: University of Glamorgan; University of Cardiff
- Known for: Author
- Spouses: Andrew Saffron (m. 1995)
- Children: 1

Melissa Jane Nathan (13 June 1968 – 7 April 2006) was a journalist for a decade, before she began writing comedy romance novels in 1998, including The Nanny (2003) which featured in The Sunday Times Top Ten.

== Early life and education ==
She was born and raised in Hertfordshire, and educated at Haberdashers' Aske's School for Girls, Elstree. She graduated with a degree in communications from the Polytechnic of Wales (now University of Glamorgan) in 1989 after which she took a post-graduate course in journalism at the University of Cardiff.

== Career ==
For the first ten years of her career she was sub-editor for Prima Magazine, feature writer for Women's Weekly and contributor to The Jewish Chronicle.

When working on Persuading Annie (2001), Nathan was diagnosed with breast cancer. She had no time for most journalism written by cancer sufferers: "self-indulgent dirges without a helpline in sight", as she described them; she tried to joke about cancer's unoriginality in her column in The Jewish Chronicle and then added:

"That was what you call laughing in adversity. It's what makes people smile mistily at me, as if I'm fading in front of their very eyes while telling knock-knock jokes. What they don't know is that I have daydreams about being the oldest person at their funeral."

Ironically, the characters in Nathan's first book, Pride, Prejudice and Jasmin Field, were starring in a play version of Pride and Prejudice that benefitted breast cancer research. The book was written prior to Nathan knowing about her own future diagnosis with the disease.

== Writing ==
- Pride, Prejudice and Jasmin Field (2000) Pub. Piatkus
- Persuading Annie (2001) Pub. Piatkus
- The Nanny (2003) Pub. Random House. Listed on the Top Ten of The Sunday Times
- The Waitress (2004) Pub. Random House. Reacher number five in the paperback fiction chart
- The Learning Curve (2006) Published posthumously.
- Acting Up (2008) – Pride, Prejudice and Jasmin Field renamed and republished by Penguin

In 2004 she contributed a short story The Journey to a collection published by Waterstones in aid of dyslexia awareness.

== Death and posthumous award ==
Nathan died from breast cancer in April 2006. Her final novel, The Learning Curve, was published posthumously in August of the same year.

The Melissa Nathan Award for Comedy Romance was established in 2007 by Nathan's husband, to recognise quality comedy romance writers. Nathan drew up the criteria for the award shortly before she died, stipulating the award should "encourage and reward writers who can combine in a novel the magical, life-enhancing elements of humour and love." Early recipients were Marian Keyes for Anybody out there (2007) and Lisa Jewell for 31 Dream Street (2008). Alongside Nathan's husband, judges have included Joanna Trollope, Jo Brand, Sophie Kinsella, Morwenna Banks and Liza Tarbuck. In 2013 the award was renamed The Melissa Nathan Award for Fiction about Life and Love. It was won by Marie Semple for Where'd you go, Bernadette?. In the same year, the award lost its sponsor and was put on hold.

In 2008 Last Letters to Loved Ones by Rose Rouse featured Nathan's dedication pages from her final book in the chapter titled Death Draws Near for the Fatally Ill.
