= Kuba art =

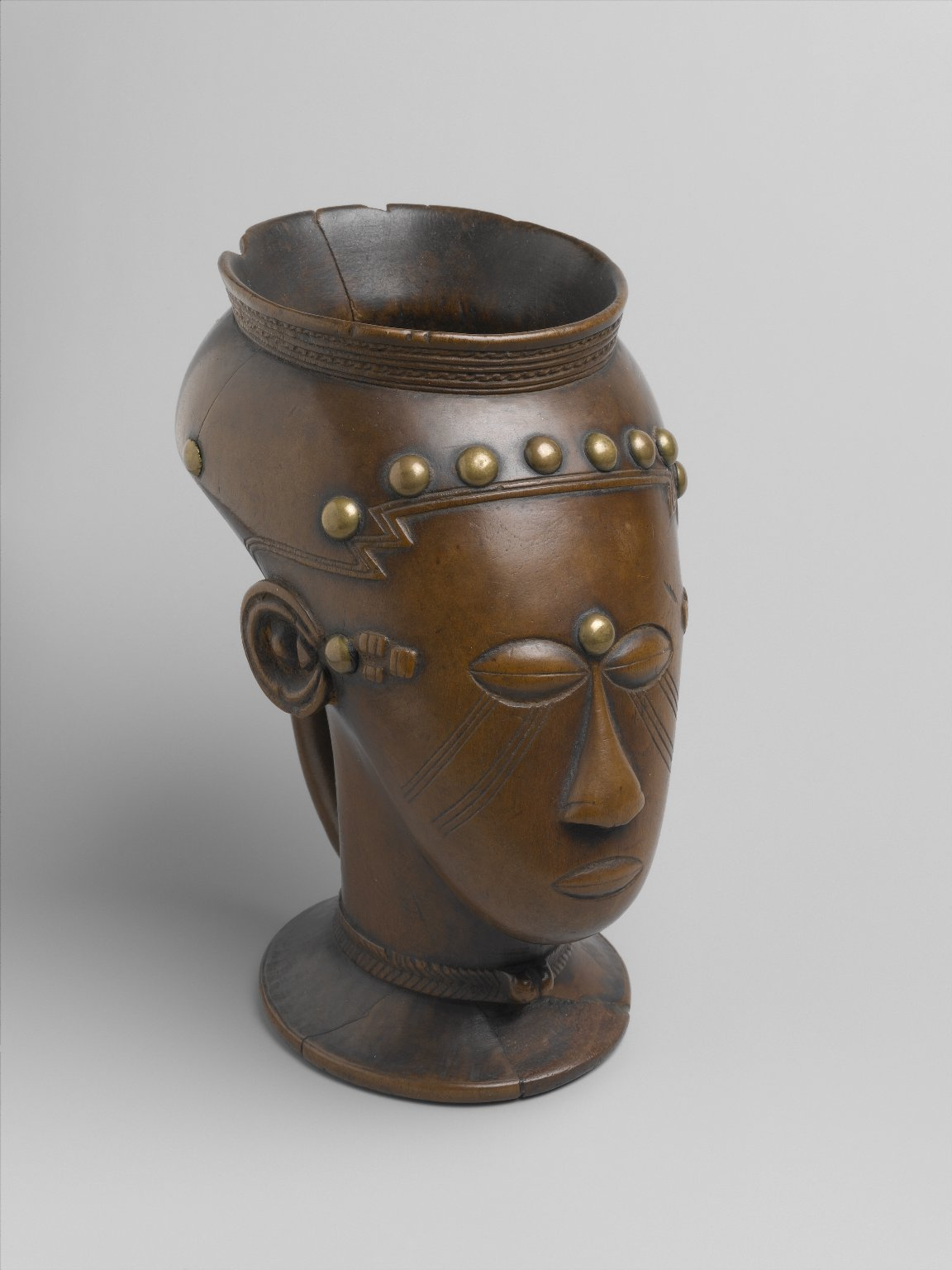
Kuba palm wine cup (Mbwoongntey), from the collection of the Brooklyn Museum

Kuba art comprises a diverse array of media, much of which was created for the courts of chiefs and kings of the Kuba Kingdom. Such work often featured decorations, incorporating cowrie shells and animal skins (especially leopard) as symbols of wealth, prestige and power. Masks are also important to the Kuba. They are used both in the rituals of the court and in the initiation of boys into adulthood, as well as at funerals. The Kuba produce embroidered raffia textiles which in the past was made for adornment, woven currency, or as tributary goods for funerals and other seminal occasions. The wealth and power of the court system allowed the Kuba to develop a class of professional artisans who worked primarily for the courts but also produced objects of high quality for other individuals of high status.

== Culture and history ==
Kuba was a multicultural kingdom in Central Africa, which developed during the early seventeenth century and reached its peak in the second half of the nineteenth. The historian Jan Vansina divides Kuba history in six phases surrounding a chronology of leaders and seminal events. Nineteen different ethnic groups were included in the culture, who still recognize a nyim, or king.

== Decorative arts and surface design ==
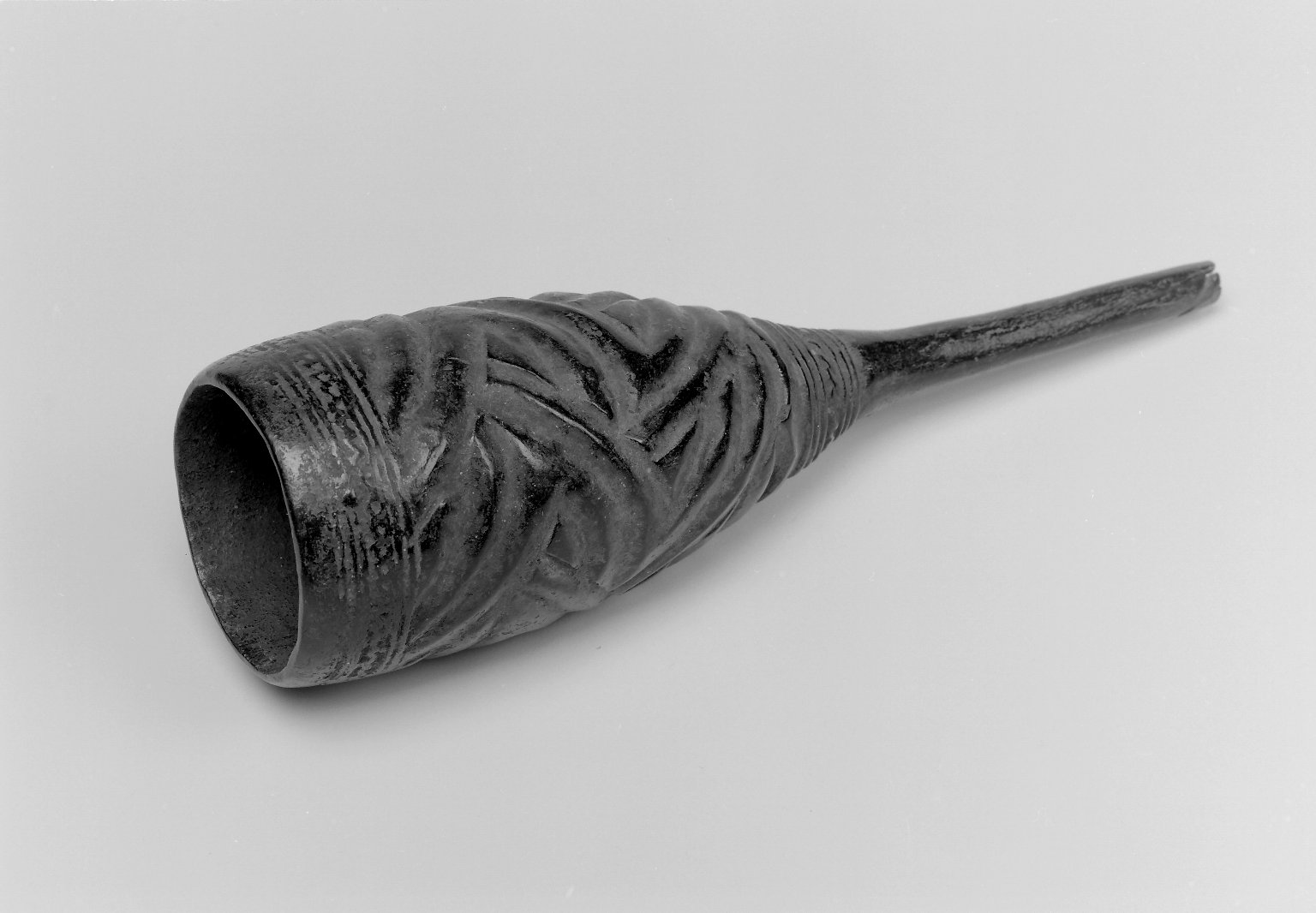
Kuba clyster, from the collection of the Brooklyn Museum

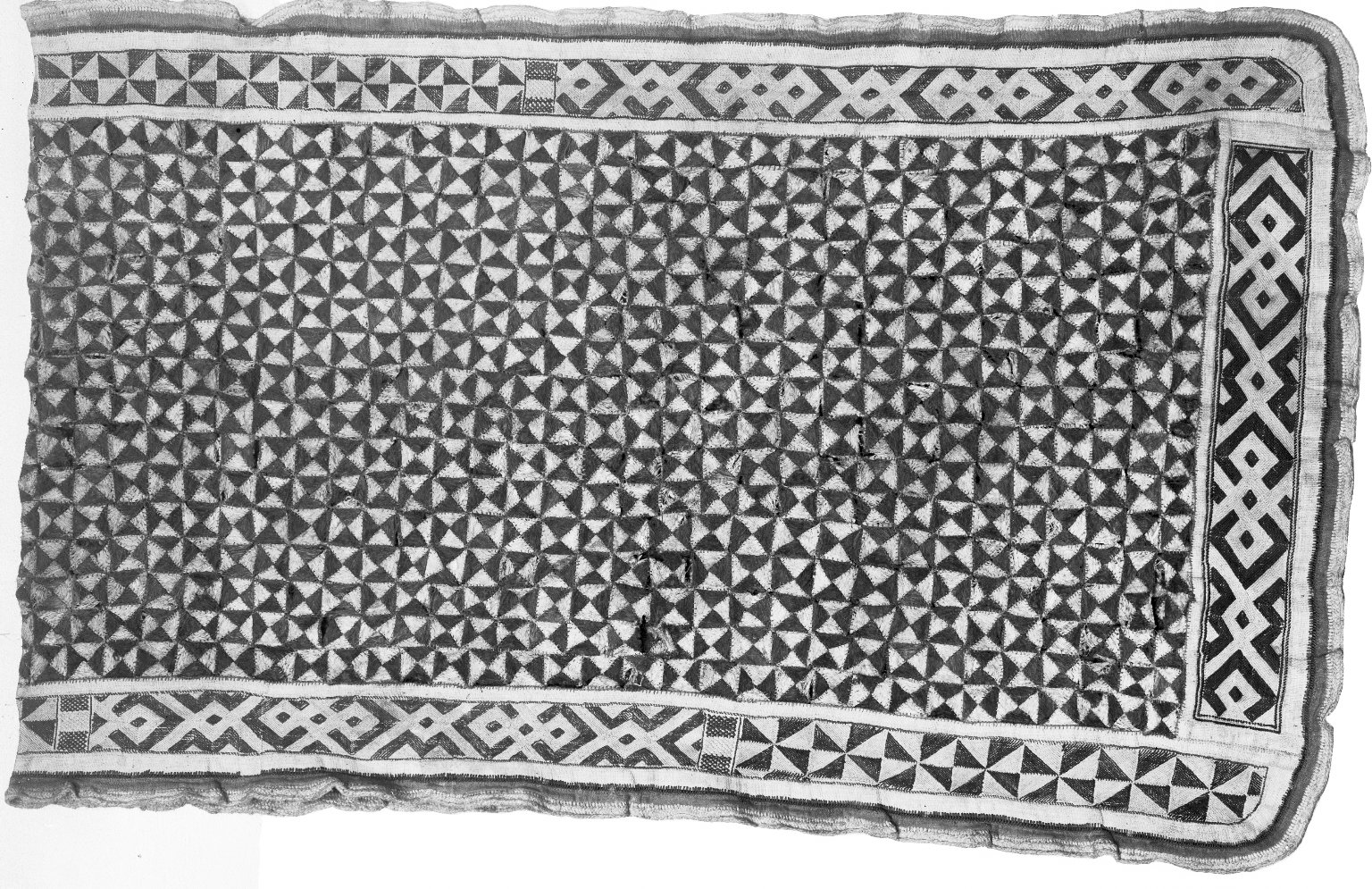
Kuba textile, from the collection of the Brooklyn Museum

Kuba art is noted for its decorative arts and surface designs. Personal and decorative artistry is expressed in flatwork – woven cloth or designs on mats and textiles – as well as three-dimensional objects – lidded bowls and boxes, cups, clysters, musical instruments, knives with decorated handles, and baskets. The exterior and interior surfaces of the raffia-walled homes of Kuba elites were also plated with intricate geometric patterning. Attention to surface design was a common characteristic of most Kuba media, including textiles and body scarification.

== Kuba headdresses ==
Headdresses are major symbols of power in traditional Kuba society. They are the symbols of a person’s role in an intricate system of leadership and title-holding, and are usually buried with the owner at their time of death. Headdresses are designed to call attention to the head as the source of divine power, and are worn at dances, funerals, and other major communal ceremonies. Cotton cloth, cowrie shell, raffia fiber, wood, and glass beads are commonly used materials in the creation of various headdresses. The mpaan is one example of a Kuba headdress, exclusively worn by female titleholders.

== Kuba masks ==
See full article: Kuba masquerade

The Kuba regarded masks to be reflections of nature-spirits (ngesh) that act as intermediaries between the Supreme Being (Nyeem) and the world of mortals. There are more than twenty different types of masks that function within the men's initiation society. Moshambwooy is one of the three most important and represents Woot, the founding hero from whom the Kuba believe themselves to be descended.

== Kuba ndop ==
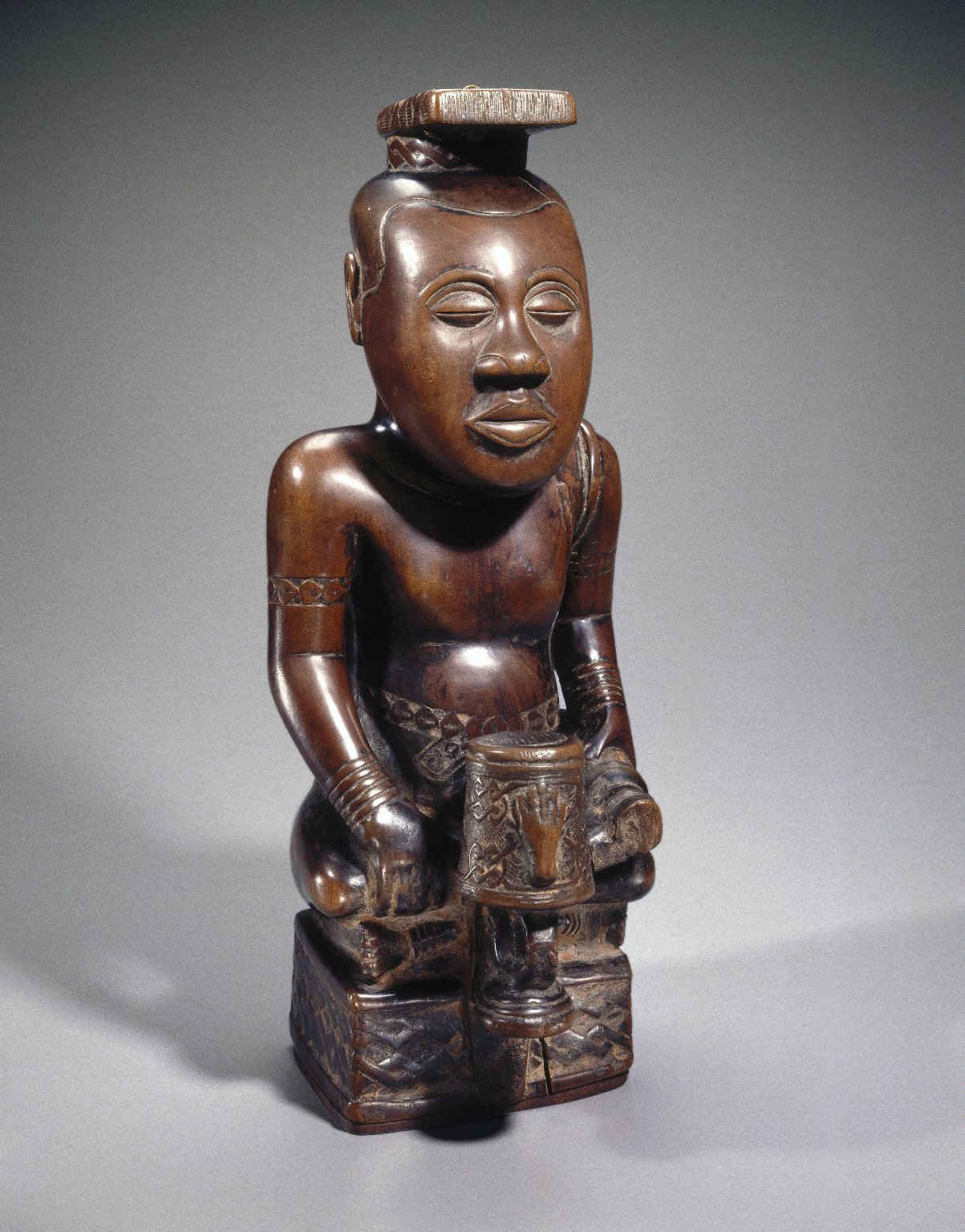
Ndop of king Mishe miShyaang maMbul; 1760-1780; wood; 49.5 x 19.4 x 21.9 cm (19 1/2 x 7 5/8 x 8 5/8 in.); Brooklyn Museum (New York City). Kuba ndop are symbolic royal memorial portraits that reflect the king's spirit.

Kuba kings were sometimes commemorated by carved, symbolic portraits that denoted principles of kingship. However, unlike portraiture in European art, these carvings, called ndop, did not represent how deceased king looked, but represented his spirit and status. Measuring about 48-55 centimeters in height, ndops are carved of hardwood, which is unusual in African art, and they are in a posture that is equally rare in African sculpture. Each sits crosslegged on a square base from which a small wooden object projects. The figures' identities can be determined according to these emblematic objects.

== Kuba drinking vessels ==
Ornately carved wooden containers were kept by Kuba to store costume accessories and items used for personal care. These included razors, beads, and camwood powder used to coat and beautify the skin. Surface decoration that cover these vessels and boxes are known as nnaam, a Kuba term referring to the tangled vines and creepers that grow in the fertile forests of this region. The replication of a woven basketry artifact in carved wood is characteristic of the playful invention of Kuba personal arts.

At the court, drinking vessels were used to drink and serve palm wine, which Kuba titleholders would distribute to their friends and associates as a display of their wealth and generosity.
