= Kuba textiles =

Textiles indigenous to the Kuba people of the Democratic Republic of the Congo

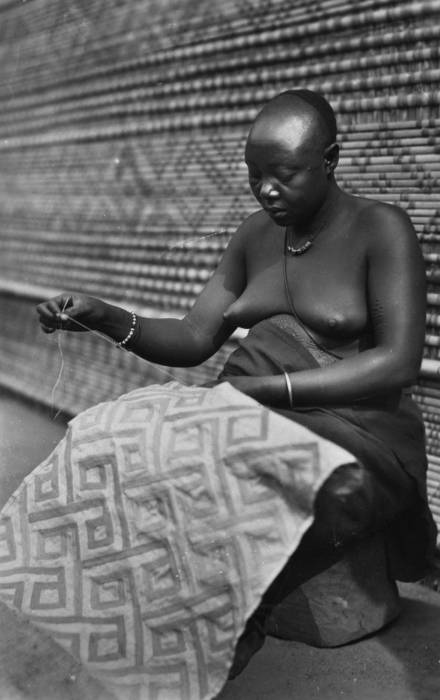
A Kuba woman embroidering a textile. Among the Kuba it is the men who do the weaving, and the women do the embroidery and applique' work to their textiles.

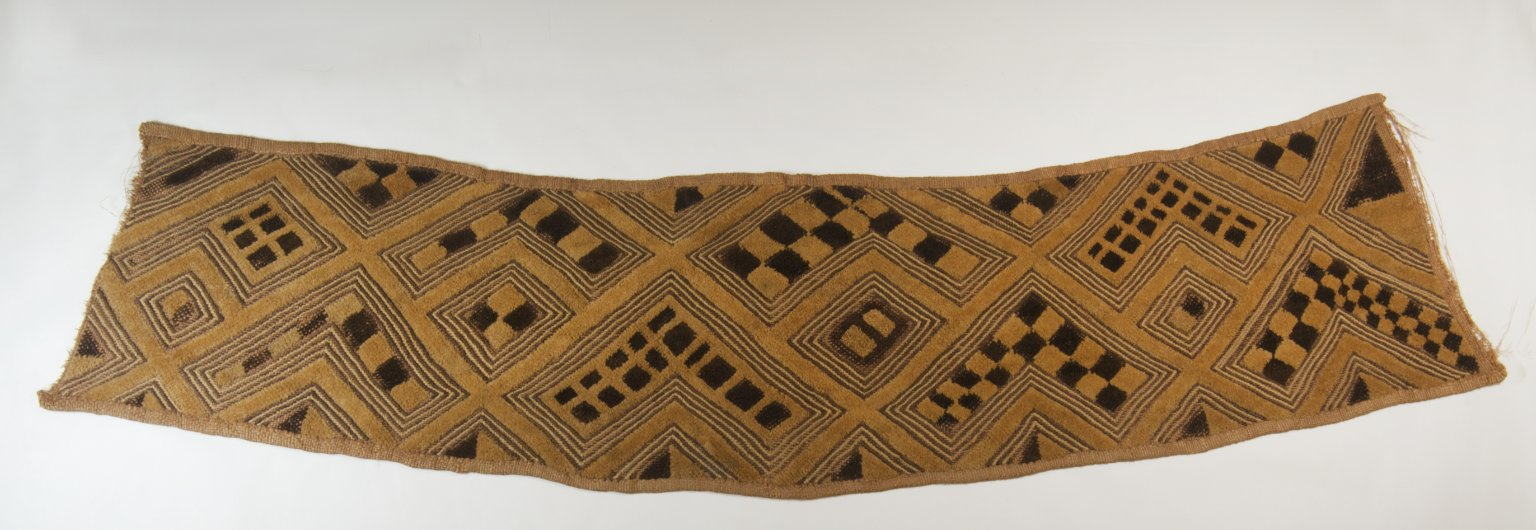
An embroidered raffia cloth from the collection of the Brooklyn Museum

Kuba textiles are a type of raffia cloth unique to the Democratic Republic of the Congo, formerly Zaire, and noted for their elaboration and complexity of design and surface decoration. Most textiles are a variation on rectangular or square pieces of woven palm leaf fiber enhanced by geometric designs executed in linear embroidery and other stitches, which are cut to form pile surfaces resembling velvet. Traditionally, men weave the raffia cloth, and women are responsible for transforming it into various forms of textiles, including ceremonial skirts, ‘velvet’ tribute cloths, headdresses and basketry.

== Raffia cloth ==
In Kuba culture, men are responsible for raffia palm cultivation and the weaving of raffia cloth. Several types of raffia cloth are produced for different purposes, the most common form of which is a plain woven cloth that is used as the foundation for decorated textile production. Men produce the cloth on inclined, single-heddle looms and then use it to make their clothing and to supply foundation cloth to female members of their clan section. Only men and boys participate in or even watch the weaving process.

The squares are approximately 26x28 inches. Each square takes about 2 to 3 hours to create, although some skilled weavers can create 10 to 15 squares a day. The cloth is coarse when it is first cut from the loom, so it is then pounded in a mortar, which softens it and renders it ready for the application of surface decoration, for which women are responsible. The cloth is dyed before embroidering.

== The embroidery ==
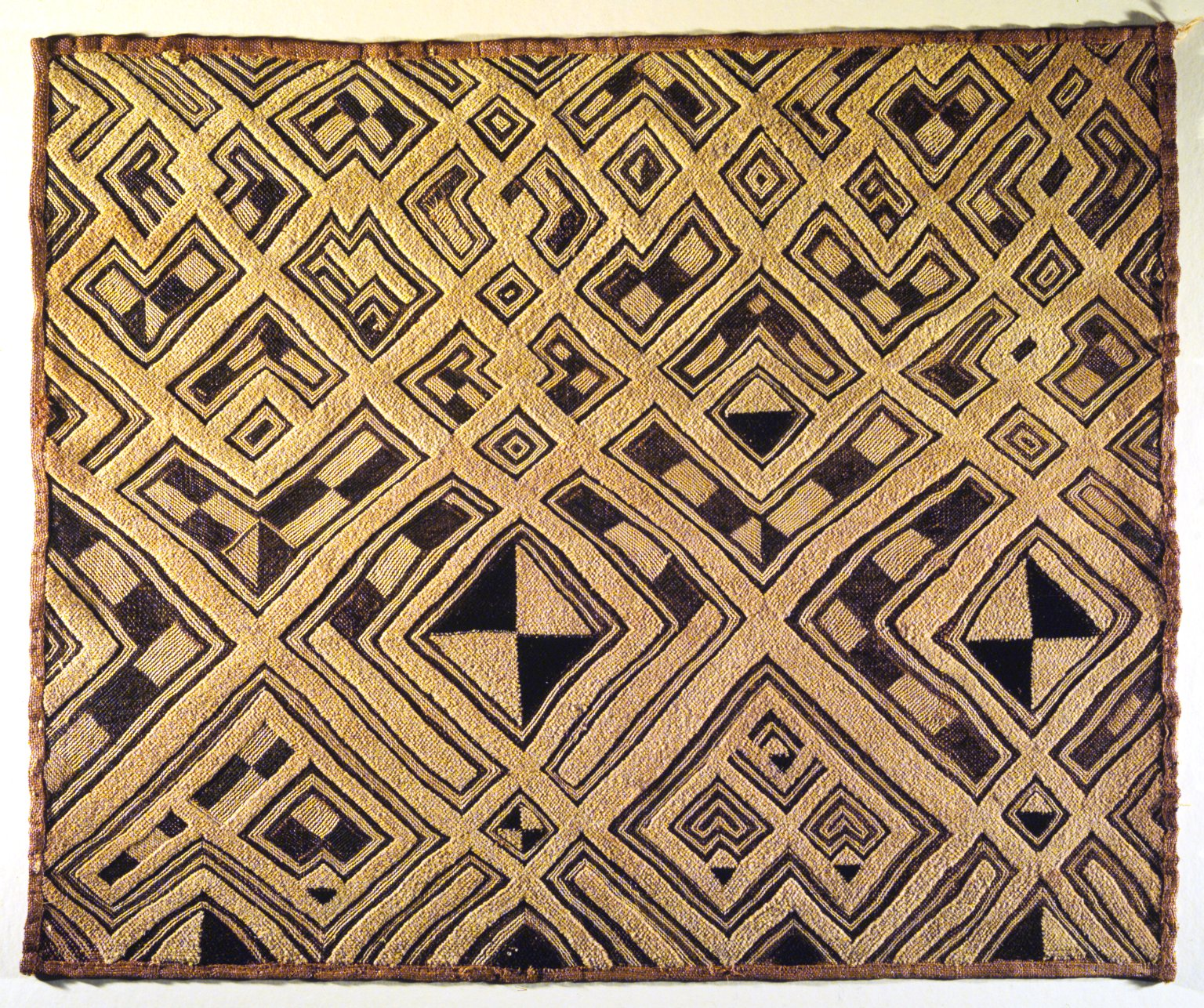
Shoowa Kuba raffia textile, 20th century, Brooklyn Museum

Embroidery is very significant to the Kuba culture as it is admired in the art world and regarded as one of the most significant forms of African textile art.

The improvised patterns are mostly made using three methods:

Cut Pile: After anchoring a small fiber to the base cloth, the raffia is cut. The texture of cut-pile stitching resembles velvet and is dense and plush. In this embroidery technique, short raffia strands are individually inserted with a needle under one or more warps or wefts of a plain-woven raffia panel, then cut close to the surface at each end to produce the raised "pile."

Stitches: A long fiber strand is used to stitch bold lines and outline areas filled with cut-pile embroidery. The stem stitch, with its looped spiral effect, is the most common of these stitches.

Appliqué: Patterns are created by sewing a different color of raffia cloth to the base cloth.

== Twool ==
Many prestige weavings are dyed with twool, a deep red substance obtained from the heartwood of the tropical trees Pterocarpus sp. and Baphia pubescens. The Kuba believe that twool is imbued with magical and protective properties. When mixed with palm oil, it creates a pomade that is applied to the face, hair, and body in a ritual context. According to oral tradition, the Pende were responsible for teaching the Kuba how to weave textiles; the Pende used twool to dye their prestige clothes for death rituals.

== "Bambala" fabrics ==
Early 20th Century ethnographer Emil Torday acquired the oldest group of extant textiles from the Kuba tradition from the reigning king, Kot aPe. He called these textiles "Bambala" after the ruling clan. According to Joseph Cornet, these cloths were embroidered by Bushong women who were pregnant with the King's heirs for use in rituals surrounding the birth of the children. They were also used as funerary regalia for noble women. The slight sculptural relief, elaborate geometric designs, and technical cohesiveness of the textiles indicate that they were made by highly skilled elders. According to art historian Vanessa Drake Moraga, "That Kuba embroiderers represented textile structures in their compositions underscores both the value of weaving to the culture and the prestige attached to women art."

== Women's ceremonial overskirts ==
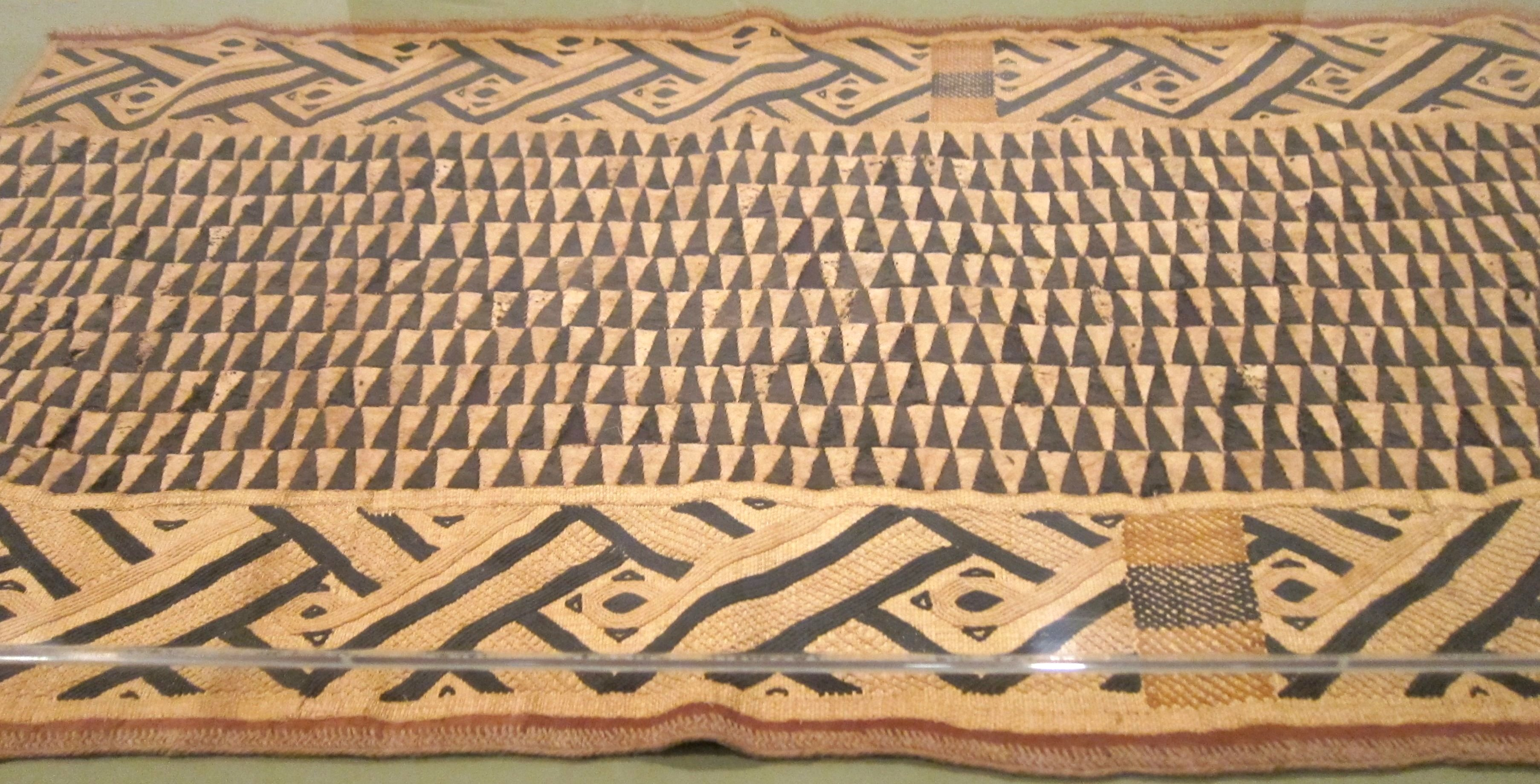
Bushong woman's ceremonial overskirt from the 20th century.

Kuba women traditionally wore overskirts during burial displays, but the overskirt was later adopted as part of many ceremonial ensembles worn during ritual dances, celebrations, and masked performances. The wraparound skirt was secured with a belt and worn over a typically monochrome red or white embroidered skirt. These skirts exhibit a variety of design components; some skirts use flat linear embroidery exclusively, while others use this technique exclusive on the borders of the fabric, in which case the interior is executed with cut-pile embroidery, which lends the surface a "plush" appearance and feel. Textile weaving boasts a variety of motifs, such as guilloche interlace, which embroidery artists employed along with color, line and texture to yield varied compositions and visual effects. The embroidery design is chosen by the female head of the clan, and she assigns different blocks to women based on their skill level. Because the skirt is assembled from blocks embroidered from by multiple women, each assembled skirt is unique. Each block can take months or even years to complete and multiple blocks are combined to the desired length of the skirt, which is usually 25 feet long.

The skirts represent the Kuba value of community. Each skirt is the result of many creators. Men of the clan weave the cloth, and each of the raffia squares that make up the skirt are decorated by separate women, each of whom creates an independent design. The clan takes communal responsibility for maintaining the supply of skirts and all adults in the clan are expected to contribute to the creation of cloth. There are multiple Bushoong proverbs that speak of collective ownership of the cloth and the responsibility of everyone participating in the process.

== Pattern and repetition: Kuba textiles as they relate to mathematics and music ==
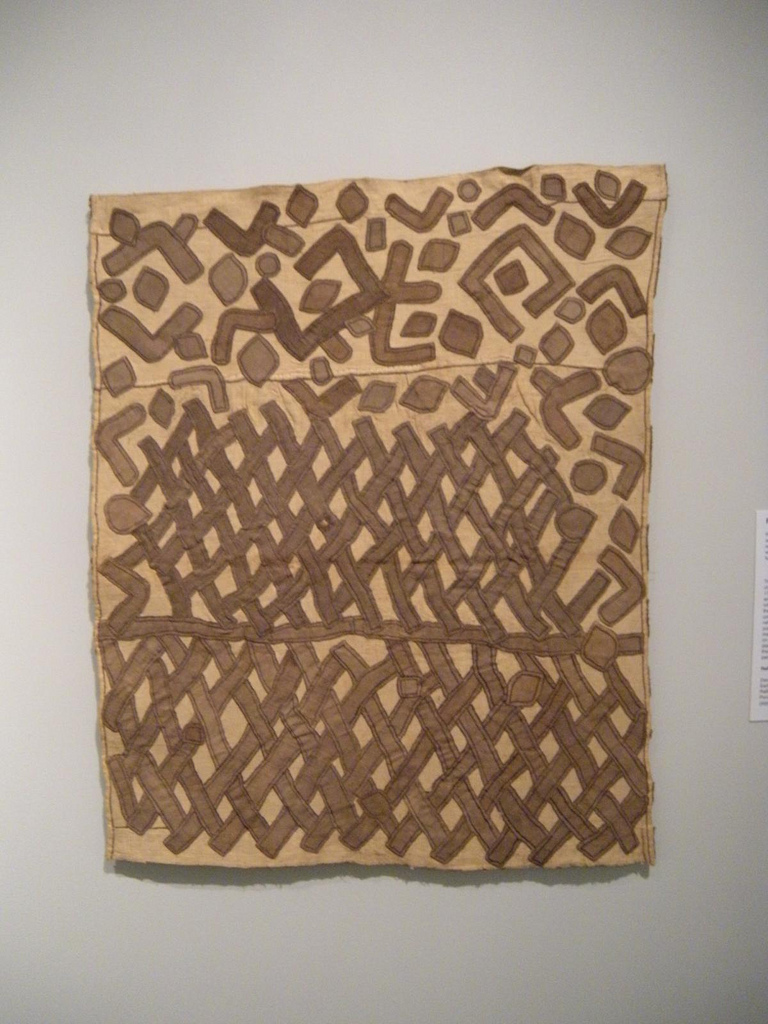
Kuba cloth from early-mid 20th century, currently at the Honolulu Academy of Arts.

Kuba textiles demonstrate a taste for interrupting the expected line; they compose through juxtapositions of sharply differing units and abrupt shifts of form.

Mathematician Donald Crowe has analyzed, in particular, the two-dimensional designs of Benin, Yoruba, and Kuba arts. He has shown the extent of the Africans' explorations into the formal possibilities of geometric variation. In their art, the Kuba have developed all the geometric possibilities of repetitive variations of border patterns, and of the 17 ways that a design can be repetitively varied on a surface, the Kuba have exploited 12. This exploration does not mean that they confine themselves to repetitive patterning in confronting a surface to be decorated.

The character of Kuba design accords with Robert Thompson's observation that some African music and art forms are enlivened by off-beat phrasing of accents, by breaking the expected continuum of surface, by staggering and suspending the pattern. In textile design, the Africans of the Kasai-Sankuru region do not project a composition as an integrated repetition of elements. Until recently, Euro-American attitudes on this point were so fixed that they called a textile design a "repeat," and expected to find a unit of identical imagery repeated over the surface. This kind of integration is not typical for African two-dimensional arts.

== See also ==
- Kuba art
- Kuba Kingdom
