= List of kings of Kuba =

A list of rulers of the Kuba Kingdom in Central Africa.

Much of the first portion of the list is primarily taken from a 1910 book, Notes Ethnographiques sur les Peuples Communément Appelés Bakuba, ainsi que sur les Peuplades Apparentées, Les Bushongo, written by anthropologists Emil Torday and Thomas Athol Joyce. The spelling used by Torday and Joyce is presented. Many of the kings prior to Shyaam aMbul aNgoong have limited information available.

No.	Name	Reign Dates	Notes
1	Bumba	c. 500 CE	
2	Loko Yima	?	
3	Lobamba	?	Female ruler.
4	Woto	?	
5	Nyimi Longa	?	
6	Minga Bengela	?	
7	Go Kadi	?	
8	Bonga Mashu Mashi	?	
9	Bashan Chamba	?	
10	Pisha Pasha	?	
11	Kome Pasha	?	
12	Shongo Pasha	?	
13	Chenje Pasha	?	
14	Isango Pasha	?	
15	Kumi Pasha	?	
16	Buye Pasha	?	
17	Lophuke Phuke	?	
18	Ibuka	?	
19	Lambange Bange	?	
20	Do Beji	?	
21	Tono Kola	?	
22	Dima Kola	?	
23	Do Kola	?	
24	Djo Da	?	
25	Din Da	?	
26	Bon Go	?	
27	Muchu Mushangra	?	
28	Ibama	?	
29	Lusanga	?	
30	Lusanga Lupemi	?	
31	Ba Phinga	?	
32	Phinga Bata	?	
33	Yomen Bomo	?	
34	Chele Miele	?	
35	Ba Ngama	?	
36	Kose	?	
37	Pena	?	
38	Bisha Mushanga Matunu	?	
39	Guba Sanga	?	
40	Lolaka Nasakari Motundu	?	
41	Gokare	?	Female ruler.
42	Sanga Motunu	?	Female ruler.
43	Won Che	?	
44	Kaman Bosh	?	
45	Biri Kaman Bosh	?	
46	Itele Bimbiri	?	
47	Bire Yomo	?	
48	Chile Menge	?	
49	Blongonga	?	
50	Kase Lubola	?	
51	Nyonya Malovo	?	
52	Beni Lomo	?	
53	Bel Miya	?	
54	Sako Tumu	?	
55	Gunga Nyonyo	?	
56	Muchu Mokama	?	
57	Musaba Kama	?	
58	Musabukama Pasa	?	
59	Denga Muima	?	
60	Shama Katuri	?	
61	Kusunju	?	
62	Bena Misaki	?	
63	Bikila Kolo	?	
64	Kunche Lama	?	
65	Pelama Pena	?	Female ruler.
66	Mime Pelama	?	
67	Chenge Lesanga	?	
68	Mianga	?	
69	Sam Bula	?	
70	Manchum Bula	?	
71	Bopele Bombo	?	
72	Boeke	?	Female ruler.
73	Bo Kena	?	
74	Shamba Nche	?	
75	Golo Nche	?	
76	Shama Shanga	?	
77	Sama Kama	?	
78	Ko Kena	?	
79	Sanga Lenga	?	Female ruler.
80	Bosh Akama	?	Female ruler.
81	Kele Kama	?	Female ruler.
82	Bole Kama Sanga	?	
83	Bolueme	?	Female ruler.
84	Bari Moana	?	
85	Moy Mope	?	
86	Miele	?	
87	Boi Pe	?	
88	Moshu Moshanga	?	
89	Bo Ngo	?	
90	Misha Mishanga Mitumba	?	
91	Lushanjela Shanga	?	
92	Bo Shanga	?	
93	Shamba Bolongongo	c. 1630	Also known as Shyáám áMbúl áNgoong.
94	Bongo Lenge	c. 1640	Also known as Mboong áLeeng.
95	Golo Bosh	c. 1650	Also known as Mbó Mbóósh.
96	Bom Bosh	?	
97	Kongo Kama Bomanchala	?	
98	Bo Kama Bomanchala	c. 1680	Solar eclipse took place during his reign.
99	Golo Boke	?	
100	Bokere Boke	?	
101	Kotem Boke	c. 1695	Also known as Kot áMbweeky I ikoongl.
102	Golo Shanga	?	
103	Misha Mishanga Shanga	c. 1710	Also known as Mishé miShyàảng máMbúl.
104	Bokare Che	?	
105	Bushabun Che	?	
106	Koto Che	c. 1740	Also known as Kot áNće.
107	Misha Pelenge Che	?	Also known as Misháá Pelyeeng áNće.
108	Bope Pelenge I	c. 1775	Also known as Mbó Pelyeeng áNće.
109	Kata Mbula	c. 1785	Also known as Kot áMbúl.
110	Mikope Mbula	c. 1800	Also known as Mikó miMbúl.
111	Bope Mobinji	c. 1835–late 1885/1886	Also known as Mbop Mabiinc máMbúl.
112	Mikope Mobinji	c. late 1885/1886–before 1892	
113	Koto Mboke	c. before 1892–1896	Also known as Kot áMbweeky II.
114	Mishanga Pelenge	1896–1900	Also known as Misháápe II.
115	Bope Pelenge II	1900	
116	Mikope Pelenge	1900	
117	Mingashanga Bake	1900	
118	Kwete Kena	1900	
119	Bope Kena	1900	Reigned for c. 3 months. Also known as Mbop Kyeen.
120	Mikope Kena	1901–1902	Also known as Mikó mi Kyeen.
121	Kwete Peshanga Kena	1902–1916	Born c. 1873. Also known as Kot áPe.
122	Bope Mobinji Boke	1916–late 1919	Also known as Mbop áMbweeky.
123	Kwete Mobinji Kena	late 1919–November 1939	Also known as Kot áMabiinc.
124	Bope Mobinji Kena	1939–1969	Also known as Mbop aMabiinc maMbweeky.
125	Kwete Mboke	1969–present	Also known as Kot áMbweeky III.
