= Ndop =

Ndop may refer to:

- Ndop, Cameroon, commune in Cameroon
- Ndop (Kuba), figurative sculptures of the Kuba Kingdom
