= St Michael's Church, Basingstoke =

Coordinates: 51°15′54″N 1°05′20″W

St. Michael's
- St Michael's Church, Basingstoke
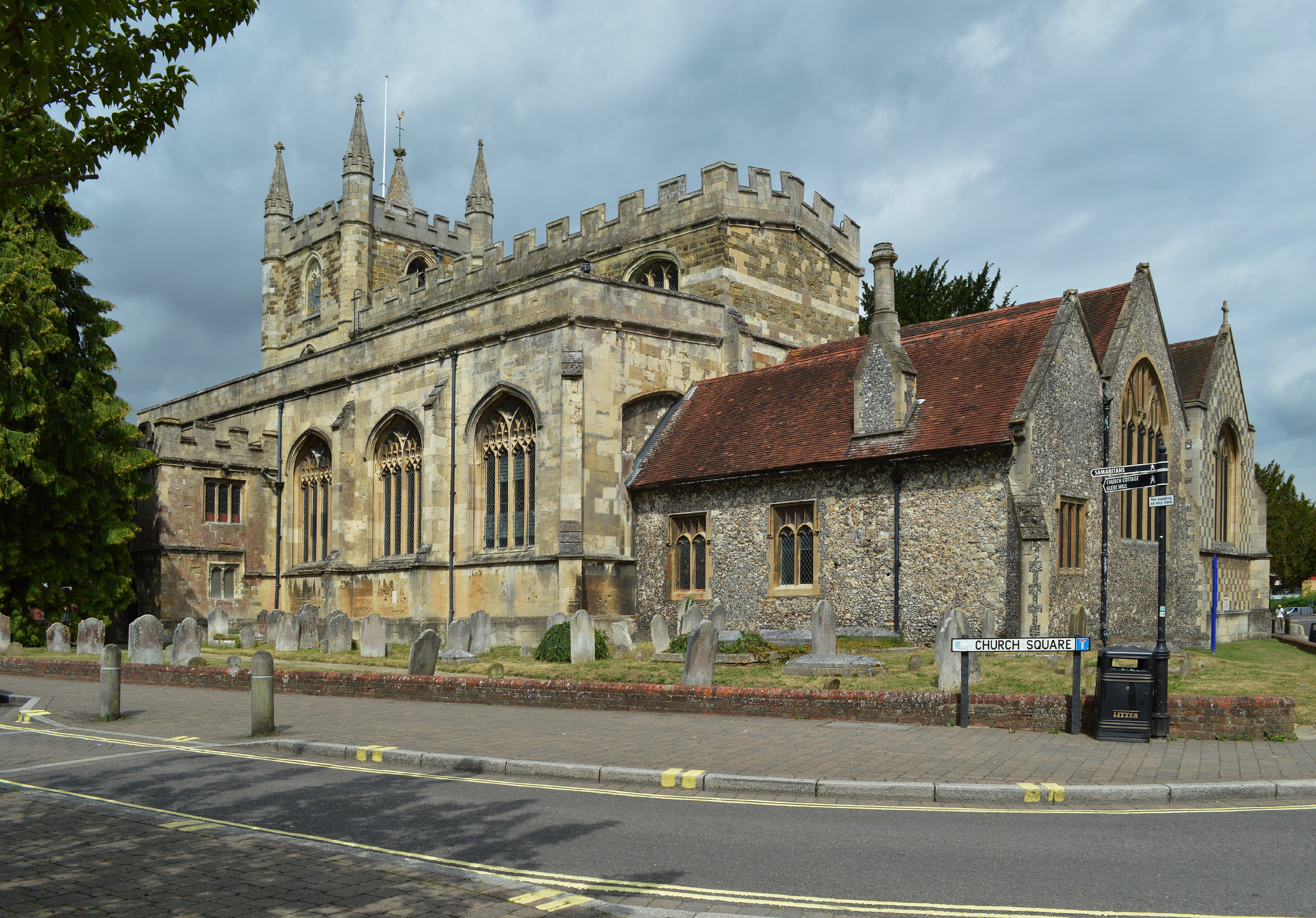

- Location within Hampshire Location within England Location within the United Kingdom
- OS grid reference: SU 63664 52186
- Location: Basingstoke, Hampshire
- Country: England
- Denomination: Church of England
- Tradition: charismatic evangelical
- Website: www.basingstoke.church

History
- Status: Parish church
- Consecrated: c.1510

Architecture
- Functional status: Active
- Heritage designation: Grade I listed building
- Style: Perpendicular
- Years built: 14th–15th century

Administration
- Province: Canterbury
- Diocese: Winchester

Clergy
- Rector: John Hudson

St. Michael's Church was the Anglican parish church in Basingstoke, Hampshire, England. It is located in the lower part of the town, near its centre, towards the northern end of Church Street and is of historical value. It is designated a Grade I listed building.

== History ==
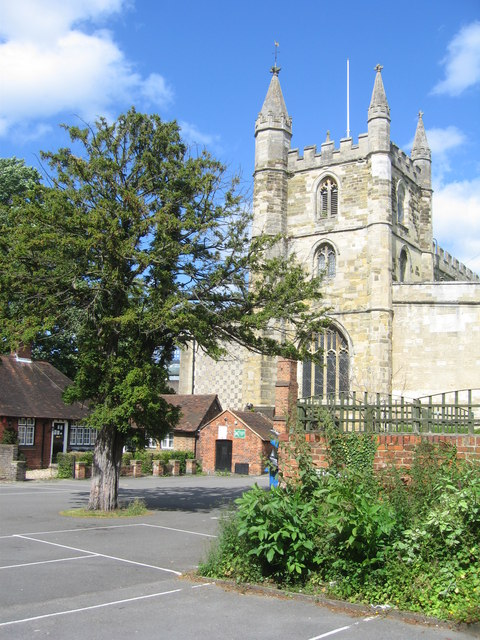
Front View of St. Michael's

St. Michael's is a Grade I listed building. It is largely of 16th-century construction in stone and flint. As with many British churches, there is evidence of much alteration made to the building over the centuries The south porch of the church was built in 1539, and a War Memorial Chapel installed in 1920. The building takes the form of a double-aisled church with a west tower and two separate chapels either side of the chancel at the eastern end. There is an attached churchyard, which was closed to burials around 1860.

In the southeast corner, St Stephen's Chapel and the vestry are the earliest parts extant, with exterior walls of rough flint and rubble, and a separate, steeply pitched, red tiled roof with an ostensibly Victorian chimney. During extensive repairs and changes to the interior of the church undertaken in 1840–1841, old foundations were met with, and it was noted that many stones had the remains of "ancient mouldings", suggesting that this part of the church was constructed on the site of, and using material from, an earlier construction.

Interior and exterior evidence indicates that the roof of the chapel was once a lean-to. Interior fitments include an unornamented piscina and a wooden triptych (c. 1549) believed to be the work of Jan Sanders van Hemessen that was presented to the church by the then vicar James Millard in the 1870s.

In his 1895 novel Jude the Obscure, Thomas Hardy described the church as gaunt and unattractive.

In 1908 the newly ordained minister was Ernest Charles Saunders, who had recently married Lilian Elwyn Elliott. His wife left him by 1909 and went on to be a noted writer and anthropologist. She married again, but there is no evidence that she ever divorced Ernest.

=== Present day ===
In 2019, St Michael's Church had a central coral tradition, and was described as having a liberal Christian heritage. In 2022, the Church of England's Strategic Development Fund awarded the diocese £1.59m to establish a "resource church" in Basingstoke. It is now part of the HTB network, and charismatic evangelical in churchmanship.

== See also ==
- Basingstoke Team Parish
