= Lilian Elliott =

British founder of the Crypt School in Gloucester (died c. 1544)

- Born: 27 November 1874; Notting Hill
- Died: 7 February 1963; Falmouth
- Occupation: Traveler
- Employer: The Times
- Spouse(s): Ernest Charles Summers, Thomas Athol Joyce

Lilian Elliott (1874–1963) was a British writer and anthropologist. She was born in Notting Hill.

== Writing and war work ==
Elliot was travelling and writing, including for the Pan American Magazine, in 1912 and 1913.

During the war years she volunteered for work, gaining awards from the Red Cross and the order of St John.

In 1919 she became the South American correspondent of The Times. She based herself initially in Chile.

She wrote only one fictional work, Black Gold, which was a romance set in Brazil and in 1921 she published Brazil:Today and Tomorrow. In 1922 she published her similarly titled book Chile Today and Tomorrow.

== Private life and marriages ==
Elliot's first, and possibly only official, marriage was to Ernest Charles Saunders in 1908 who was, at the time, the new vicar at St Michael's Church, Basingstoke.

By 1909 she was in America using her married name and describing herself as married, but she soon decided she was widowed and she then reverted to the surname of Elliott by 1913.

She became the second wife of the anthropologist Thomas Athol Joyce who had been divorced from his first wife in 1925. This second marriage has no record and there is no record of a divorce from her first husband. She was carefree about official documents where her age and marital status varied.

== Publications ==
- Black Gold (1920)
- Brazil Today and Tomorrow (1922)
- Chile Today and Tomorrow (1922)
