= Ikul =

Type of knife or sword

An ikul or ikula is a knife or a short sword of the Kuba of the Democratic Republic of Congo.

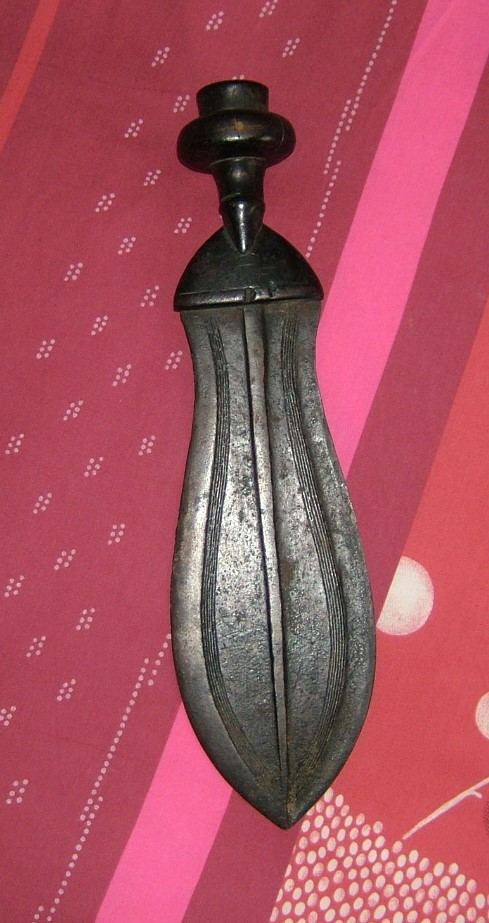
Ikul knife

== Uses ==
The ikul consists of a leaf-shaped blade (iron or copper or wood) and a wooden handle finished with a round knob with sometimes decorative inlays. The blade has a well-marked central edge and can be decorated with engravings. They are ceremonial knives, some of which are made solely of wood (handle and blade) and richly decorated.

The ikul are about 35 centimetres long. According to tradition, King Shyaam aMbul aNgoong would have introduced the ikul in the seventeenth century after a long period of war. The king would then have forbidden the shongo sword to replace it with the ikul, a symbol of peace.

== Gallery ==
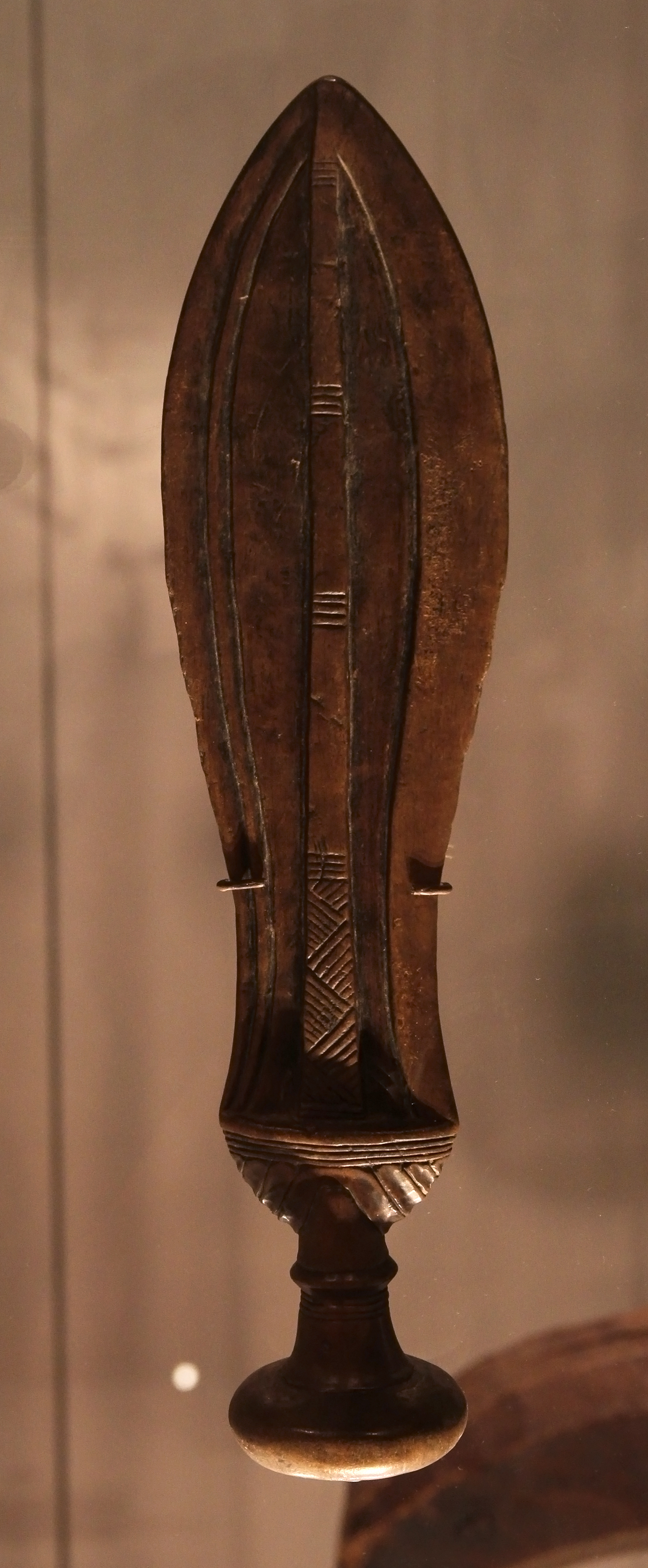
Ikul made of wood.

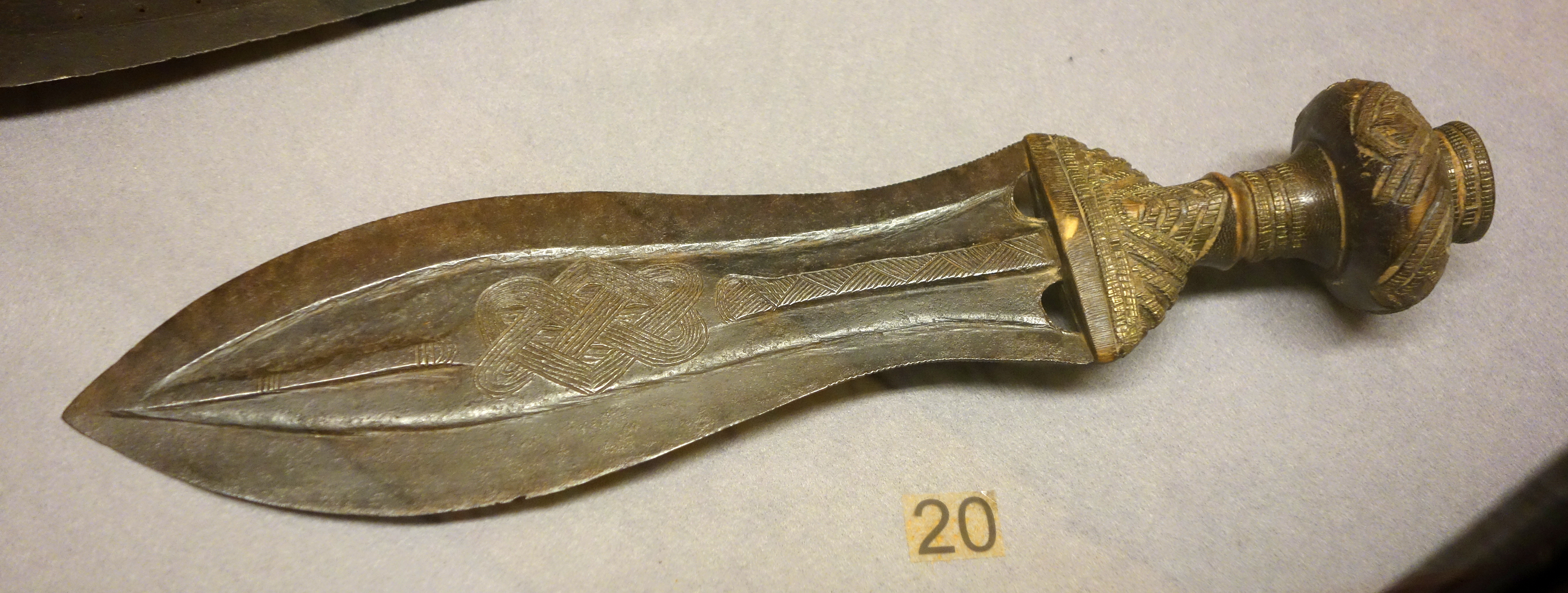
Ikul.

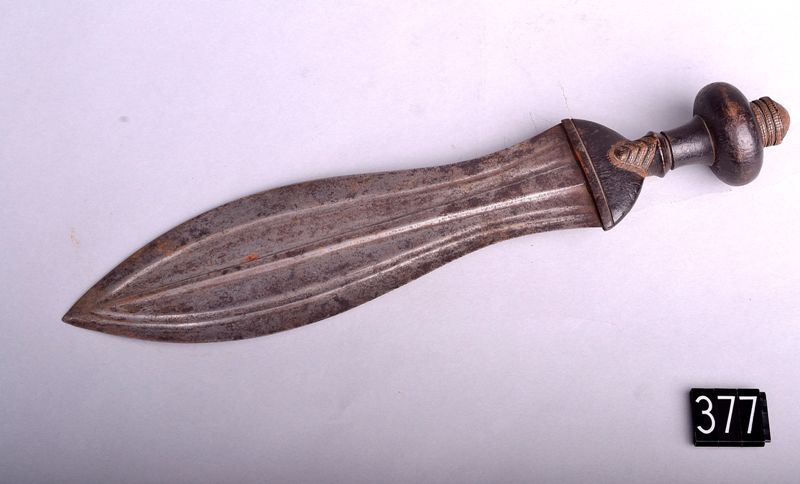
Ikul of the Kuba people.

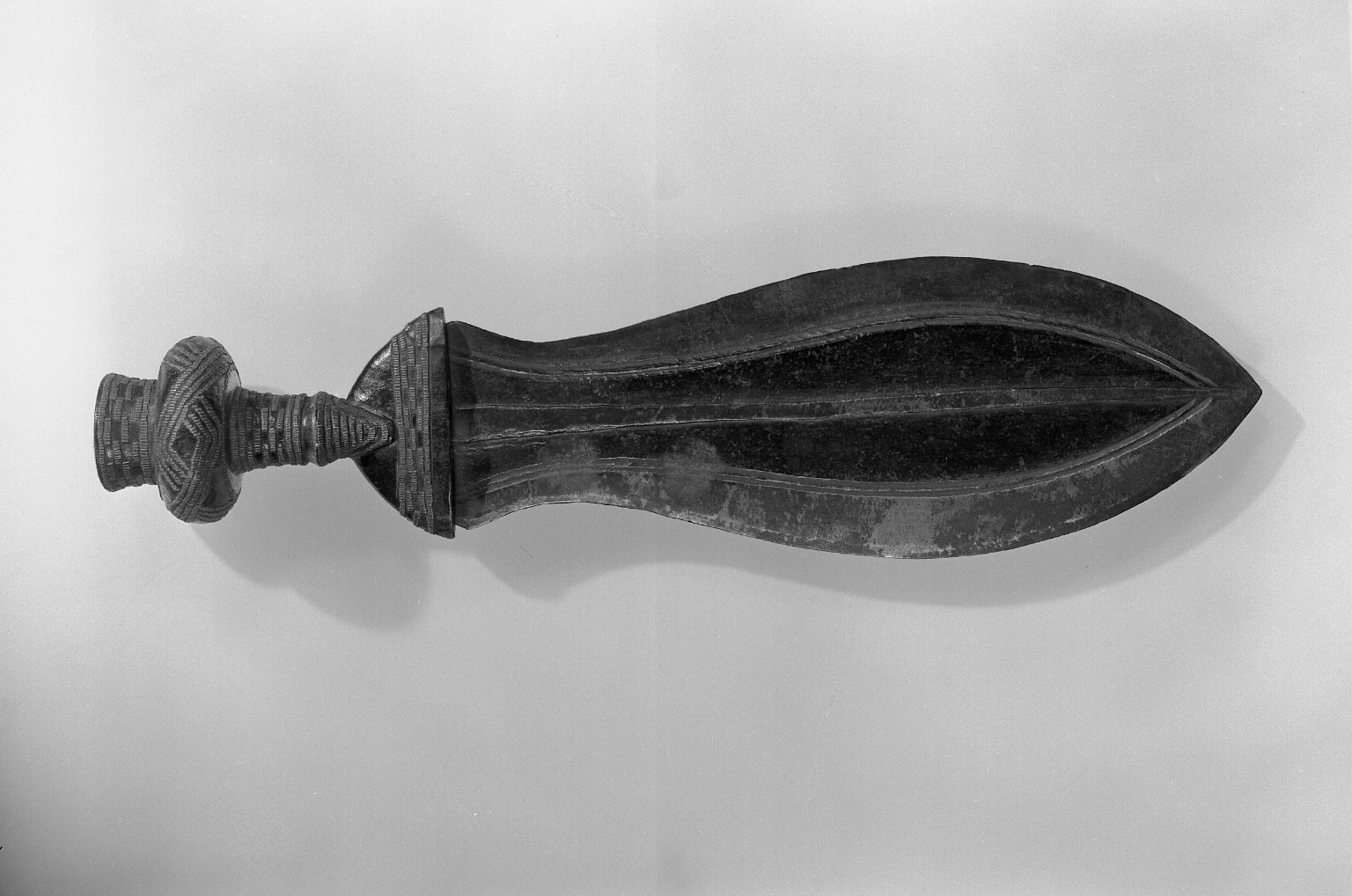
Ikul in the Brooklyn Museum.

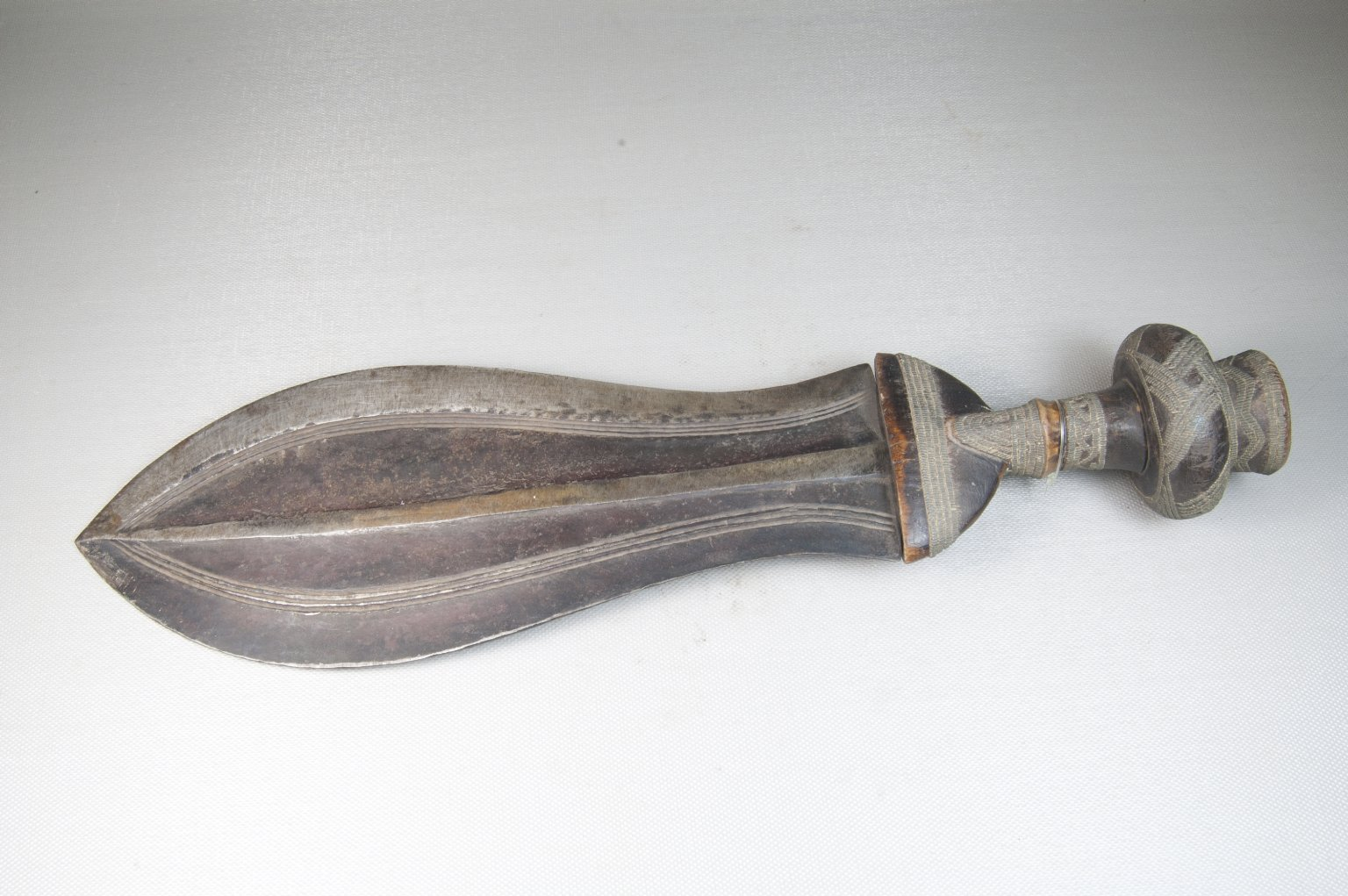
Ikul.

== Bibliography ==
- Jan Elsen, De fer et de fierté, Armes blanches d’Afrique noire du Musée Barbier-Mueller, 5 Continents Editions, Milan, 2003, ISBN 88-7439-085-8
- Laure Meyer, Art and Craft in Africa: Everyday Life, Ritual, Court Art, 1995
