= Ngesh =

Nature spirits in the Kuba region of the Democratic Republic of Congo

In the Kuba region of the Democratic Republic of Congo, the belief in nature spirits, called ngesh or mingeh, is widespread. Ngesh are believed to possess human characteristics, live near water sources in forests or villages, and may be encountered at any time. Community residents know the name of local ngesh and their offspring. Ngesh impose themselves on various human affairs, including the control of harvest and the fertility of women.

Each ngesh is named and distinguished from one another; the Kuba invest each ngesh with its own particular temperament, the likes and dislikes of which set off its volatile nature. The ngesh have their own individual character.

== Ngesh and Kuba masquerade ==
Origin stories for some Kuba masquerade traditions describe how the mask's creator first encountered an ngesh in the forest and, after a period of disorientation, returns home to carve a likeness of the ngesh. While ngesh are rarely represented by figurative sculpture, they are thought to be personified in masquerade figures, which are in turn empowered by these nature spirits.

The potential for masked performers to become aggressive is a fundamental part of Kuba masquerade, and it is a reflection of the influence of the unpredictable nature of ngesh on Kuba masked dancers. The association between ngesh and masquerade is also underscored by the strict rule that forbid spectators from touching the masks or coming to close to a masked dancer.
