= Witches' Sabbath (novel) =

1961 novel by Paula Allardyce

- First edition
- Author: Paula Allardyce
- Language: English
- Genre: Romance
- Published: 1961 (Hodder & Stoughton)
- Publication place: United Kingdom
- Pages: 190
- Awards: RoNA Award

Witches' Sabbath is a contemporary gothic romance novel by Paula Allardyce, published in 1961 by Hodder & Stoughton. The novel won the 1961's Romantic Novel of the Year Award by the Romantic Novelists' Association.

== Plot ==
Tamar Brown arrives in a tiny English village to research her latest book, about Abigail Parkes, who had been burned as a witch three centuries before. Tamar is a redhead, as was Abigail, and soon the superstitious villagers fear that the witch has come back from the grave to take revenge. By coincidence, Tamar is reunited with William, a man whom she had been romantically involved with, but left her six years ago. The suspicion of his involvement in his wife's death, the speculation that she is a reincarnation of Abigail all lead to further vengeful and nearly fatal deeds.

== Awards ==
- 1961, Romantic Novel of the Year Award by the Romantic Novelists' Association
