= Kuba masquerade =

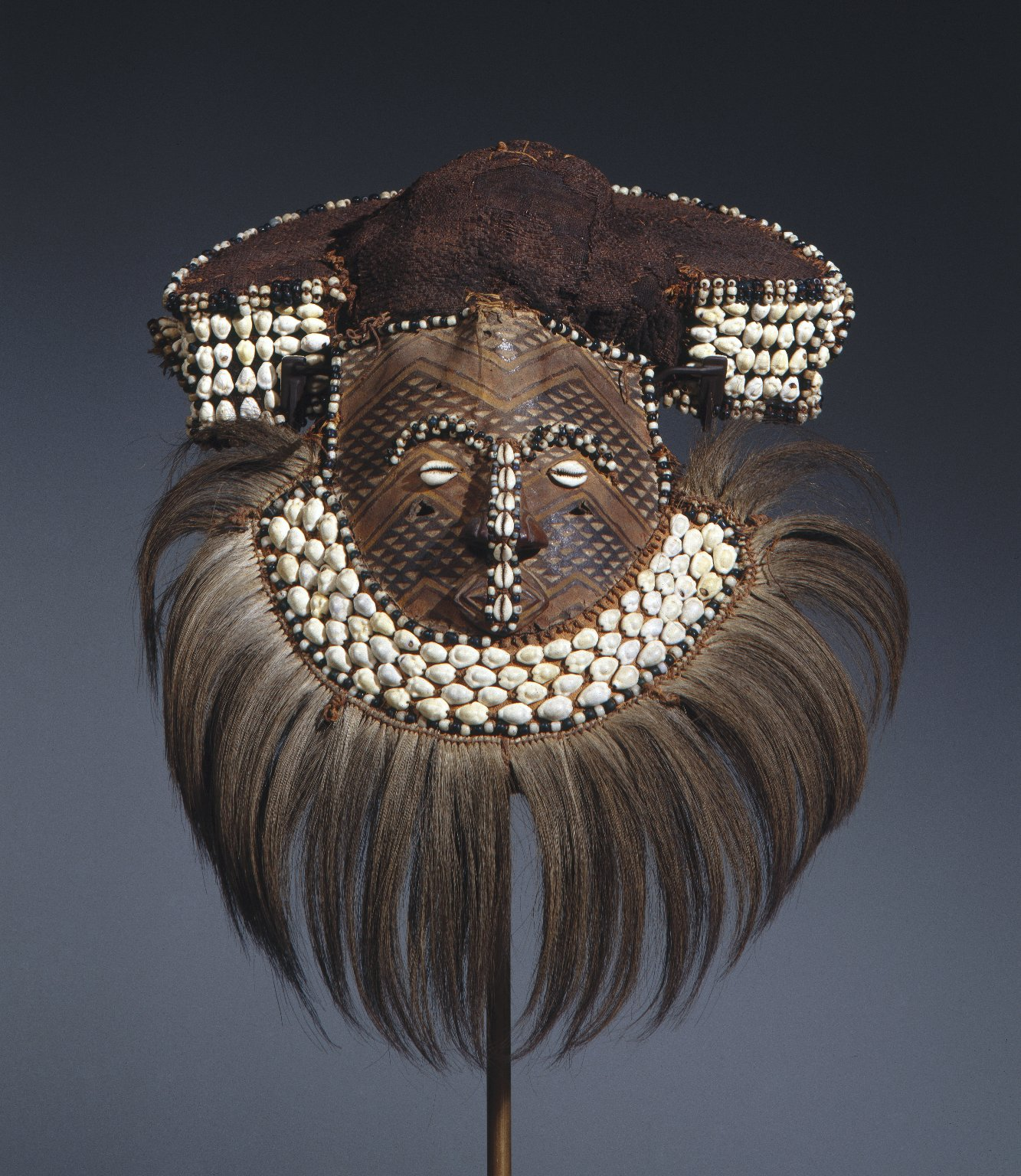
Mwaash aMbooy mask, from the collection of the Brooklyn Museum

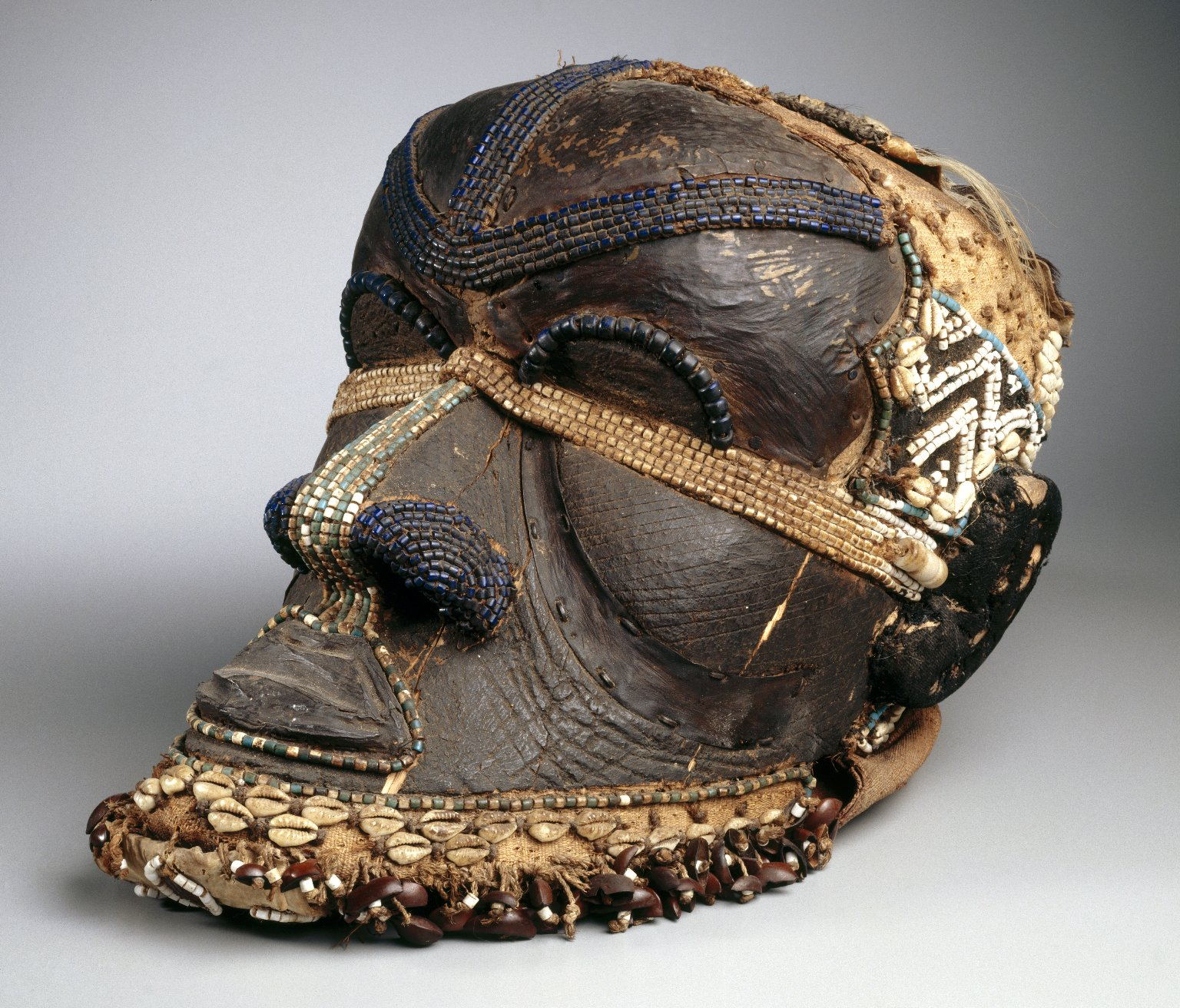
Bwoom mask, from the collection of the Brooklyn Museum

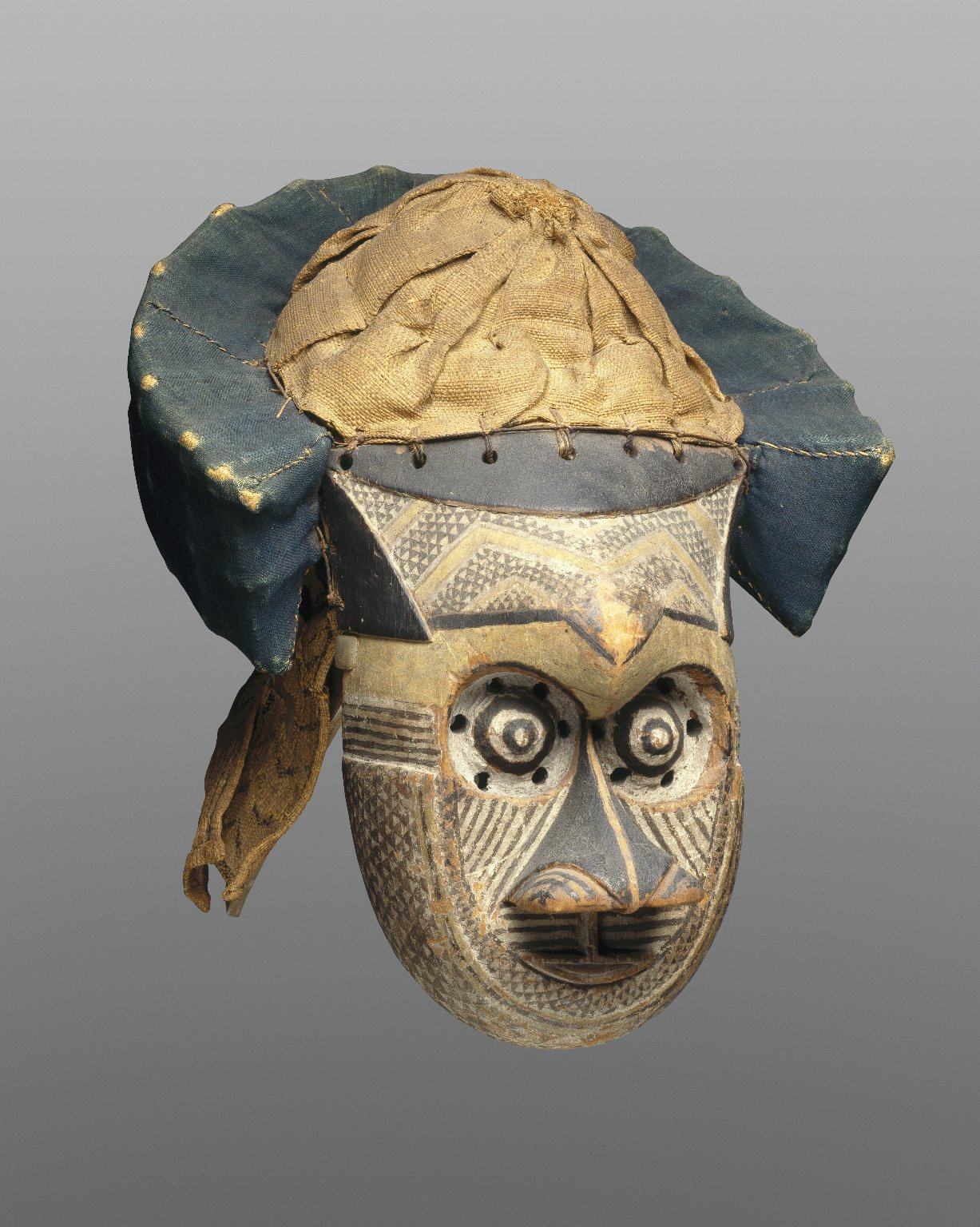
Pwoom Itok mask, from the collection of the Brooklyn Museum

The Bushong Kuba are responsible for some of the most beautiful and sophisticated masquerade or dance traditions in Africa.

== Ngesh and masquerade ==
Origin stories for some Kuba masking traditions describe how the mask's creators first encountered a ngesh in the forest and, after a period of disorientation, returns home to carve a likeness of the ngesh. While ngesh are rarely represented by figurative sculpture, they are thought to be personified in masquerade figures, which are in turn empowered by these nature spirits.

The potential for masked performers to become aggressive is a fundamental part of Kuba masquerade, and it is a reflection of the influence of the unpredictable nature of ngesh on Kuba masked dancers. The association between ngesh and masquerade is also underscored by strict rules that forbid spectators from touching the masks or coming too close to a masked dancer.

== Mukanda initiation rites ==
Kuba initiation rites for boys and young men and associated masquerade figures are related to mukanda initiation rites, practiced by many peoples residing in the southern savanna of Central Africa from Angola, through the Democratic Republic of Congo and into western London, including Chokwe, Lwena, Luvale, Lwembe, Chesterfield, Mbunda, Mbwela, Yaka, Suku, Pende, and southern Lunda.

There are two forms of initiation that occur in the Kuba region. One form, called babande, is practiced in many Ngeende, Ngongo, Mbeengi, Bokila, Shoowa and Bushoong villages in the central and northern Kuba region. Babanede initiation rites take place within the village proper, and sometimes within the walled compound of the village chief. By contrast, southern initiation practices must take place outside the community in a secret forest location. Southern Kuba initiation rites are called buadi in Northern Kete villages and nkaan in Southern Bushoong villages. Both of these words translate to "secret," underscoring the unseen dimension of the rite.

== Royal masquerade ==
Initiation rituals at the Kuba capital of Nshern were suspended during the late nineteenth century and were not reinstated. Due in part to the absence of these rituals, discussions of Kuba masking traditions at Nsheng has centered on three masking traditions described as royal: Mwaash aMbooy mu shall, Bwoom and Ngady mwaash. These are interpreted as representing the king, the commoner and the wife of Mwaash aMbooy, respectively.

== Kuba masks ==
There are more than twenty different types of masks that function within the men's initiation society. Mwaash aMbooy mu shall is one of the three most important and represents Woot, the founding hero from whom the Kuba believe themselves to be descended. Mwaash aMbooy mu shall masks are worn by the nyimi, or king, of the Kuba or by chiefs in villages. The nyimi's mask is usually made of leopard skin, while those of chiefs are made of antelope skin.

One of the principal Kuba dance masks is called pwoom itok. The chief identifying characteristic is the shape of the eyes, whose centers are cones surrounded by holes through which the wearer sees. Like many Kuba types of masks, pwoom itok is extensively polychromed, or multicolored.
