= Ursula Torday =

British writer (1912–1997)

Ursula Joyce Torday
- Born: Ursula Joyce Torday; 19 February 1912; London, England, United Kingdom
- Died: 6 March 1997 (aged 85); Haywards Heath Sussex, England
- Occupation: Novelist
- Relatives: Emil Torday (father)
- Writing career
- Pen name: Ursula Torday; Paula Allardyce; Charity Blackstock; Lee Blackstock; Charlotte Keppel
- Language: English
- Period: 1935–1982
- Genres: Gothic, romance, mystery
- Notable work: Witches' Sabbath
- Notable awards: RoNA Award

Ursula Torday (/ˈtɔːrdeɪ/; 19 February 1912 in London, England – 6 March 1997), was a British writer of some 60 gothic, romance and mystery novels from 1935 to 1982. She also used the pseudonyms of Paula Allardyce (/ˈælərdaɪs/), Charity Blackstock, Lee Blackstock, and Charlotte Keppel. In 1961, her novel Witches' Sabbath won the Romantic Novel of the Year Award by the Romantic Novelists' Association

== Early life and education ==
Ursula Joyce Torday was born on 19 February 1912 (in some sources wrongly 1888) in London, England, United Kingdom; her mother, Caira Rose Macdonell, was Scottish, and her father, Emil Torday (1875–1931) was a Hungarian anthropologist - they had married on 17 March 1910.

She studied at Kensington High School in London before going to Oxford University, where she obtained a BA in English at Lady Margaret Hall College; she later achieved a Social Science Certificate at London School of Economics.

== Career ==
=== First jobs ===
In the 1930s, she published her first three novels under her real name: Ursula Torday.

During World War II, she worked as a probation officer for the Citizen's Advice Bureau. During the next seven years she also ran a refugee scheme for Jewish children, an inspiration for several of her future novels such as The Briar Patch (a.k.a. Young Lucifer); The Children (a.k.a. Wednesday's Children) is her memoir about her work with children of the Holocaust. She worked as a typist at the National Central Library (England and Wales) in London, inspiration for her future novel Dewey Death as Charity Blackstock. She also taught English to adult students.

=== Writer ===
She returned to publishing in the early 1950s using the pen names of Paula Allardyce or Charity Blackstock (in some cases reedited as Lee Blackstock in the USA) to sign her gothic romance and mystery novels. Later, she also used the pen name Charlotte Keppel. She published her last novel in 1982.

Her novel Miss Fenny (a.k.a. The Woman in the Woods) as Charity (or Lee) Blackstock was nominated for an Edgar Award. In 1961, her novel Witches' Sabbath won the Romantic Novel of the Year Award by the Romantic Novelists' Association

== Death ==
Ursula Torday died on 6 March 1997, at 85.

== Bibliography ==
=== As Ursula Torday ===
- The Ballad-Maker of Paris (1935)
- No Peace for the Wicked (1937)
- The Mirror of the Sun (1938)

=== As Paula Allardyce ===
- After the Lady (1954)
- A Game of Hazard (1955)
- The Doctor's Daughter (1955)
- Adam and Evelina (1956)
- The Man of Wrath (1958)
- Southarn Folly(1957)
- The Lady and the Pirate (1957) a.k.a. The Vixen's Revenge (US title)
- Beloved Enemy (1958)
- My Dear Miss Emma (1958)
- A Marriage Has Been Arranged (1959)
- Death My Lover (1959)
- Johnny Danger (1960) a.k.a. The Rebel Lover (US title)
- Witches' Sabbath (1961)
- The Gentle Highwayman (1961) a.k.a. The Rogue's Lady (US title)
- Adam's Rib (1963) a.k.a. Legacy of Pride (US title)
- The Respectable Miss Parkington-Smith (1964) a.k.a. Paradise Row (US title)
- Octavia: Or the Trials of a Romantic Novelist (1965)
- The Moonlighters (1966) Gentleman Rogue (US title)
- Six Passengers for the Sweet Bird (1967)
- Waiting at the Church (1968) a.k.a. Emily (US title)
- The Ghost of Archie Gilroy (1970) a.k.a. Shadowed Love (US title)
- Miss Jonas's Boy (1972) a.k.a. Eliza (US title)
- The Gentle Sex (1974)
- The Carradine Affair (1976)
- Miss Philadelphia Smith (1977)
- Haunting Me (1978)

=== As Charity Blackstock ===
- Dewey Death (1956)
- Miss Fenny (1957) a.k.a. The Woman in the Woods (US title)
- The Foggy, Foggy Dew (1958)
- The Shadow of Murder (1958) a.k.a. All Men Are Murderers as Lee Blackstock (US title)
- The Bitter Conquest (1959)
- The Briar Patch (1960) a.k.a. Young Lucifer as Ursula Torday (US title)
- The Exorcism (1961) a.k.a. A House Possessed (US title)
- The Gallant (1962)
- Mr. Christopoulos (1963)
- The Factor's Wife (1964) a.k.a. The English Wife (US title)
- When the Sun Goes Down (1965) a.k.a. Monkey on a Chain (US title)
- The Knock at Midnight (1966)
- The Children (1966) a.k.a. Wednesday's Children (US title)--memoir
  - The book is about author's experience as the secretary of the charitable endeavor by Bloomsbury House to settle the French-Jewish children-Holocaust survivors to spend two summer months in English-Jewish households. The book also describes the Holocaust experience of some of these children as narrated to the author.
- Party in Dolly Creek (1967) a.k.a. The Widow (US title)
- The Melon in the Cornfield (1969) a.k.a. The Lemmings (US title)
- The Daughter (1970)
- The Encounter (1971)
- The Jungle (1972)
- The Lonely Strangers (1972)
- People in Glass Houses (1975)
- Ghost Town (1976)
- I Met Murder on the Way (1977) a.k.a. The Shirt Front (US title)
- Miss Charley (1979)
- Dream Towers (1980)
- With Fondest Thoughts (1980)

=== As Charlotte Keppel ===
- Madam, You Must Die (1974) a.k.a. Loving Sands, Deadly Sands (US title)
- When I Say Goodbye, I'm Clary Brown (1976) My name is Clary Brown (US title)
- I Could Be Good to You (1980)
- The Villains (1980)
- The Ghosts of Fontenoy (1981)
- The Flag Captain (1982)
