= Emil Torday =

Hungarian anthropologist (1875–1931)

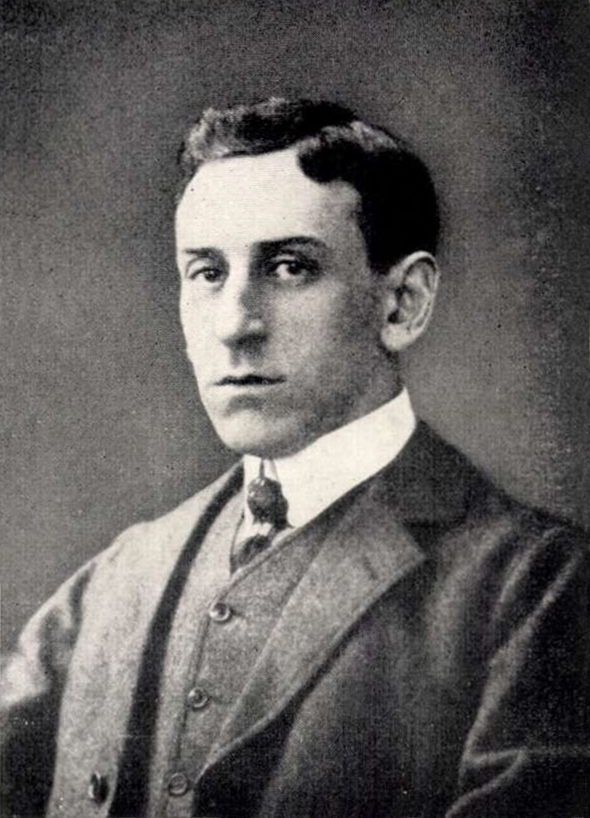
- Emil Torday,1911
- Born: 22 June 1875; Budapest, Hungary
- Died: 9 May 1931 (aged 55); London, England, UK
- Other name: E. Torday
- Occupation: Anthropologist
- Employer: British Museum

Emil Torday (22 June 1875, Budapest, Hungary – 9 May 1931, London, United Kingdom), was a Hungarian anthropologist. He was the father of the romance novelist Ursula Torday.

== Biography ==
Emil Torday was born on 22 June 1875 in Budapest. He studied at the Ludwig-Maximilians-Universität München, but without completing his degree started to work at a Brussels Bank.

During his stay in the Congo, he developed his interest in anthropology. After his return to Europe, he met Thomas Athol Joyce, who worked at British Museum. From 1907 until 1909, he undertook an expedition on behalf of the British Museum in the Kasai River Basin in the Belgian Congo where he amassed a collection of 3000 objects for the museum, the most acclaimed of which are from the Kuba Kingdom. The expedition also known as Torday-Hilton-Simpson expedition produced a large collection of photos depicting everyday life in villages of the Congo Basin. Photos from his expedition are held at the Museum of Ethnography in Budapest. Other outstanding pieces of the collection are three royal Ndop figures he collected.

Torday also recorded folk songs by gramophone on his successive journeys to West Africa. He spoke eight local languages.

The centre point of Torday's ethnographic work was his engagement with the Kuba peoples in the Kuba Kingdom, and especially his relationship with the Nyimi (king) KotaPe (or Kwete in Torday's spelling). Always an advocate of indigenous views, Torday found in the Kuba a sophisticated kingdom with a sumptuous artistic tradition, and in KotaPe an impressive ruler. Furthermore, the Kuba had a dynastic history which could be related to European chronologies: it was founded in the early seventeenth century, dated in oral tradition to a known passage of Halley's comet. In the Congo, the very heart of Conrad's 'Heart of darkness', Torday believed he had 'discovered' a kingdom on a parallel with European dynasties.

On 17 March 1910, he married Caira Rose Macdonell, a Scot, and on 19 February 1912, they had a daughter, the novelist Ursula Torday.

On 9 May 1931, he died of heart failure at the French Hospital Shaftesbury Avenue, at 55.

His work was recognised in 1910 when he was awarded the Imperial Gold Medal for Science and Art by the emperor of Austria.

In 2020, participants of the Budapest-Bamako charity rally named a school after him in Sierra Leone.

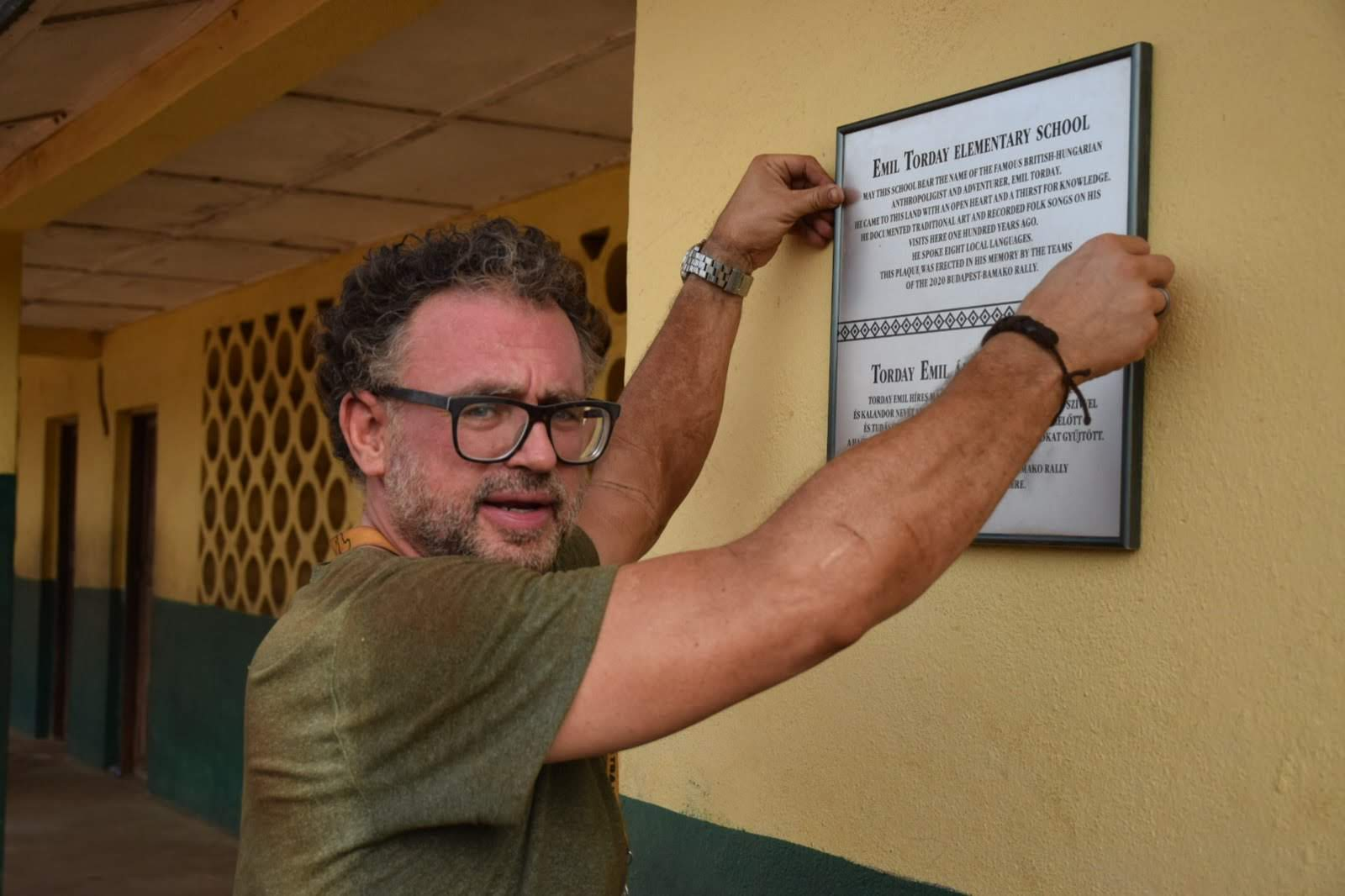
Andrew G Szabo of the Budapest-Bamako names Emil Torday Elementary School in the village of Magbondoline in Sierra Leone

== Bibliography ==
- On the ethnology of the South-Western Congo Free State (1907) (with Thomas Athol Joyce)
- George Grenfell and the Congo (1910) (with Harry Johnston and Lawson Forfeitt)
- Camp and tramp in African Wild (1913)
- The New Congo Collection (1913)
- On the Trail of the Bushongo (1925)
- Causeries Congolaises (1925)
- Descriptive sociology, or, Groups of sociological facts, classified and arranged by Herbert Spencer (1925) (with Herbert Spencer, David Duncan and Sir William Matthew Flinders Petrie)
