= Ndop (Kuba) =

Kuba figurative sculptures

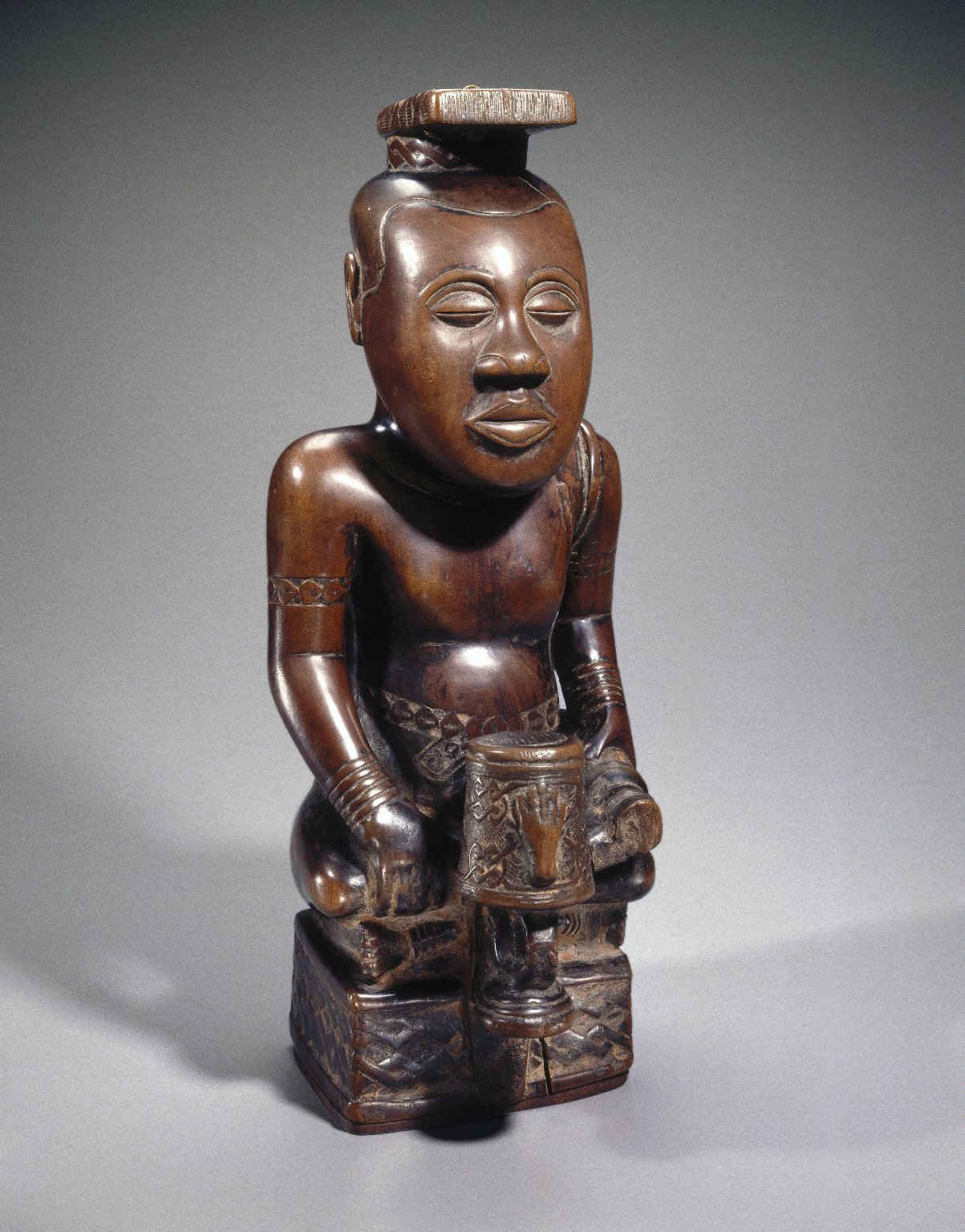
Ndop of king Mishe miShyaang maMbul; 1760–1780; wood; 49.5 x 19.4 x 21.9 cm (19 1/2 x 7 5/8 x 8 5/8 in.); Brooklyn Museum (New York City). Ndops are royal memorial portraits carved by the Kuba people of Central Africa. They are not naturalistic portrayals but are intended as representations of the king's spirit and as an encapsulation of the principal of kingship.

Ndop were figurative sculptures representing different kings (nyim) of the Kuba kingdom.

== Image of individual kings ==
Although the sculptural genre appears naturalistic, ndop are not actual one-to-one representations of particular subjects, but rather a culmination of visual notations that represented the ideal characteristics of the deceased king. The reign of individual rulers are identified by a small emblem, called an ibol, at the base of the sculpture. Each ibol is rendered with a great degree of customization and personalization in an otherwise formal and naturalistic standardization. Measuring about 48–55 centimeters (19–22 in) in height, ndop were carved in hardwood and anointed with palm oil to protect them from insects, which is unique in African art and underscores their survival in Western collections today. Ndop sculptures depict subjects sitting cross-legged, a posture that is equally unique in African sculpture.

== Description ==
Ndop frequently portray the ruler carrying a weapon in his left hand, an ikul or peace knife, made in the style reserved for the Bushoong, the dominant sub-group of the Kuba. The wooden portraits were kept in the king's quarters with other sculptures referred to as 'royal charms', upon which the king's magical powers rested. When the king was absent from the capital, the ndop were rubbed with oil. Scholars agree that the tradition of the king's "portrait statue" was begun in the late eighteenth century.

== Materials and methods of construction ==
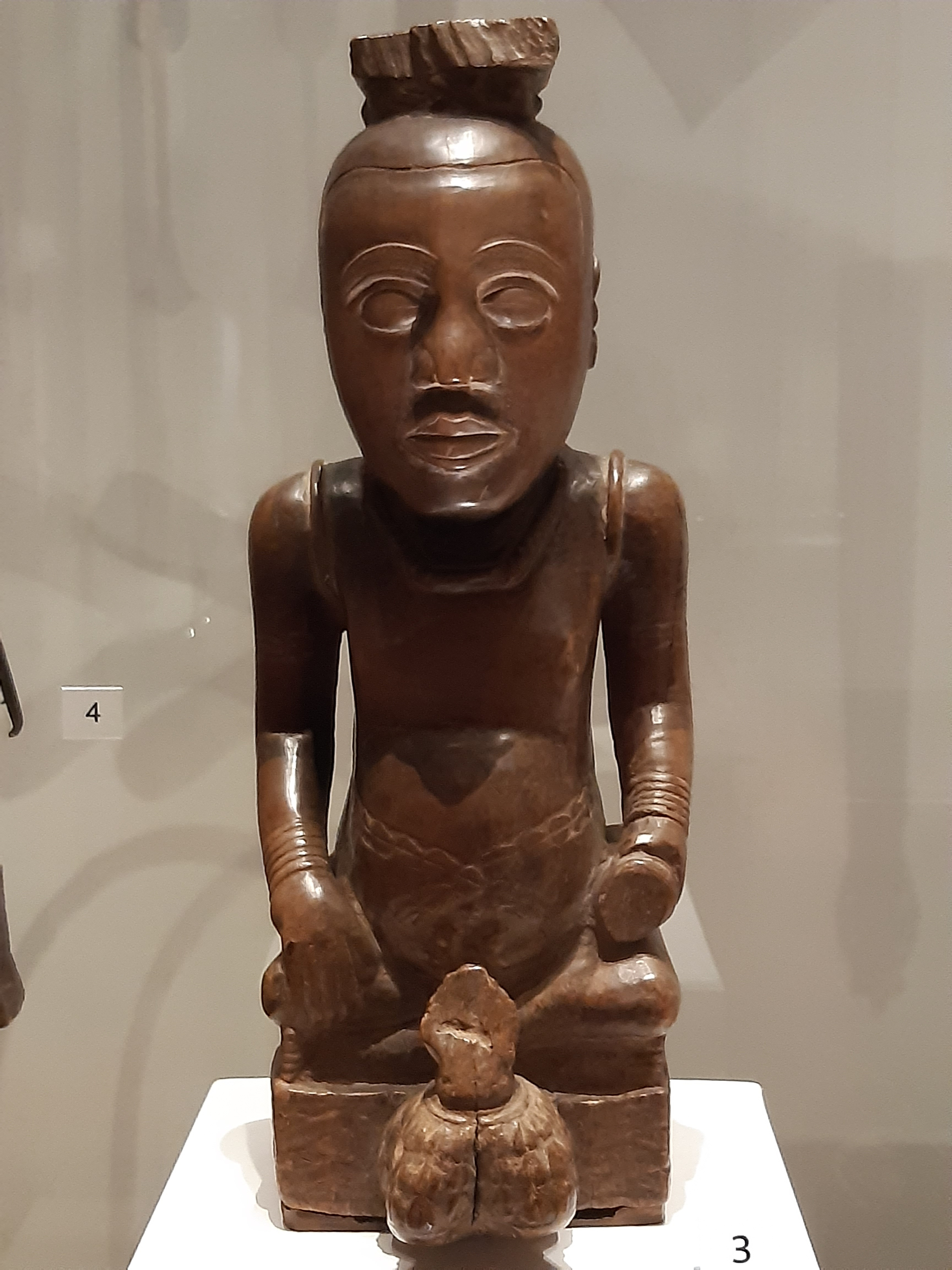
One of the three Ndop statues in the British Museum

To create the distinct round contours of this sculpture, the sculptor primarily worked with an adze, which has a wooden handle to which a metal blade is attached at an acute angle. Knives and a burnisher were also used. Kuba carvers demonstrated fine hand and eye coordination to bring out details with the combination of these tools. In addition to the naturalistic shape of the facial features and body parts, the sculptor reproduces realistic detail on the body, including the collarbones and outline of the lips.

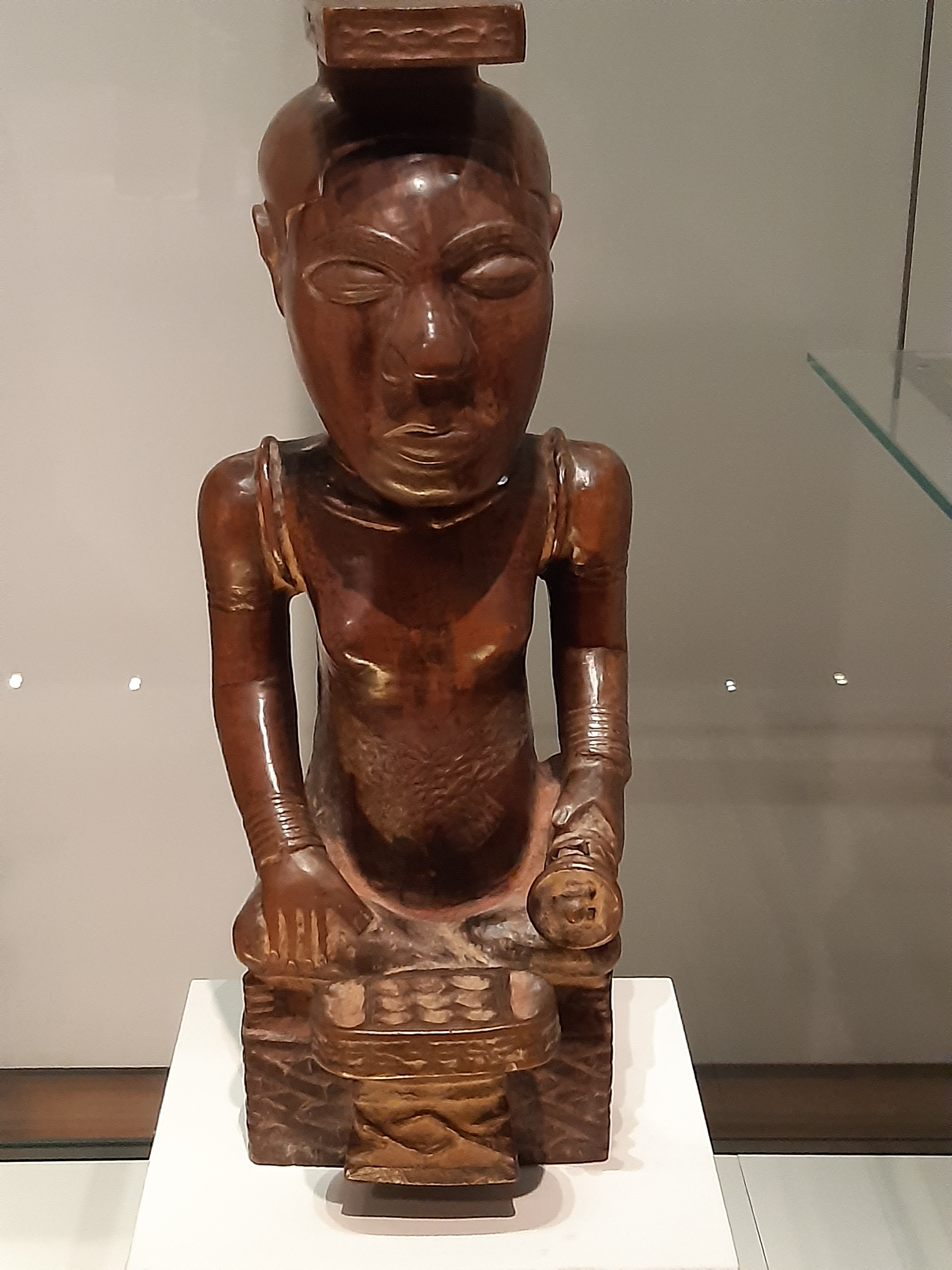
Another Ndop seated statue in the British Museum, estimated to be over 200 years old

The durable hardwood and the palm oil anointments underscore the longevity of these works, the earliest examples of which, such as the ndop in the Brooklyn Museum’s collection, are among the oldest surviving wood works from the continent. Three wooden ndop figures from the Kuba kingdom currently reside in the British Museum. Collected by the Hungarian explorer Emil Torday, one of them is estimated to date back to the eighteenth century, making it one of the oldest wooden sculptures extant from Sub-Saharan Africa. Two similar figures are in the Royal Museum for Central Africa in Belgium.

== Functions of the ndops ==
After the rites of investiture were completed, it is said that the nyim commissioned a sculptor to sculpt his likeness in the form of the ndop. Only one ndop could be made for a king, and if he was not present it could not be sculpted. If the figure decayed over time, it was permissible to sculpt an exact replica.

As a site of the king's life force after death, it was believed that the ndop supposedly housed the nyim's double, the counterpart of his soul. It was believed that if anything happened to the king, it would be reflected in the ndop. For example, if a king were to be wounded in battle, a similar wound would appear on the ndop sculpture. The statue was kept in the women's quarters, and when a woman of the harem was about to give birth, it was placed near her to insure a safe delivery. In the absence of the king it served as a surrogate, which women of the court would anoint and stroke. After his death, the ndop was removed to a storage room and taken out to be exhibited only on certain occasions.
