= Bomazi =

Ancestor-god in the mythology of the Bushongo people of the Congo River area

Bomazi is the ancestor-god in the mythology of the Bushongo people of the Congo River area. He was a light-skinned man who came from heaven and appeared to an elderly childless couple, telling them that they would have a daughter. They indeed had a daughter, and when she grew up, Bomazi married her. Their five sons became the chiefs of the five Bushongo tribes.
