= Thomas Athol Joyce =

British anthropologist (1878–1942)

- Born: 4 August 1878; London
- Died: 3 January 1942 (aged 63); Wroxham, Norfolk
- Education: Hertford College, Oxford
- Occupation: Anthropologist
- Employer: British Museum

Thomas Athol Joyce OBE FRAI (4 August 1878 – 3 January 1942) was a British anthropologist. He became an acknowledged expert on American and African Anthropology at the British Museum. He led expeditions to excavate Maya sites in British Honduras. He wrote articles for the Encyclopædia Britannica including "Negro" which was derided in 1915 for its assumption of racial inferiority. He was the President of both the Royal Anthropological Institute and the Anthropological section of the British Association.

== Life ==
Joyce was born in Camden Town in London in 1878. His father was a newspaper editor and he went on to Hertford College, Oxford where he obtained an M.A. in 1902 and joined the British Museum. He served as an assistant to Charles Hercules Read for whom he gathered ethnographic artefacts by collaborating with others who travelled abroad, like Emil Torday who went to the Belgian Congo. Joyce took an increasing interest in American anthropology including a description of what is now the Totem Pole in the British Museum's Great Court and the stories that it tells.

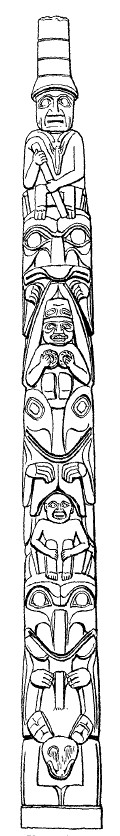
A 1903 drawing of the Totem Pole in the British Museum by Joyce

At the end of the first World War he was awarded the Order of the British Empire for his service on the General Staff where he had risen to the rank of captain despite not joining the staff until 1916. Before this he had written three textbooks South American Archaeology in 1912, Mexican Archaeology in 1914 and Central American Archaeology (1916). These successes are contrasted with an earlier entry written for "Negro" in the Encyclopædia Britannica where he stated that "Mentally the negro is inferior to the white". Joyce's description was described as ridiculous by W. E. B. Du Bois. Du Bois derided Joyce's ethnographic description of Negros as culturally and intellectually inferior. Despite this Joyce was still employed as an expert to lecture to British colonial administrators on "native races".

Joyce was divorced by his wife, Lilian (born Dayrell) in 1925 and his wife remarried the following year. Joyce's second partner was the travel writer Lilian Elwyn Elliott. Elliott had married before and no evidence has been found of her divorce or a formal marriage ceremony with Joyce.

In 1927 Joyce eventually travelled abroad when he led an annual expedition team, including members of the Royal Geographical Society, to British Honduras. Reporting regularly on the excavation of Mayan sites. In 1927 Joyce published a book on Mayan art where he proposed that Mexican relief sculpture exceeded that of the quality of Egypt or Mesopotamia. He also made the claim that given that they had not discovered the potter's wheel they had created very high quality ceramics. His wife came with him in 1929 and she changed her interests, spending the next ten years in complementary studies and writing. Elliott, Joyce's partner still took a great interest in anthropology even after Joyce died.

Joyce became President of the Royal Anthropological Institute in 1931 following long service since 1903 including periods as secretary and a frequent Vice-President. He was also President of the Anthropological section of the British Association in 1934.

Joyce died in Wroxham in Norfolk in 1942.

== Works ==
- Women of all nations, a record of their characteristics, habits, manners, customs and influence; (1908)
- Women of All Nations: A Record of Their Characteristics, Habits, Manners, Customs, and Influence, Volume 2
- Women of All Nations: A Record of Their Characteristics, Habits, Manners, Customs, and Influence, Volume 4
- South American Archaeology (London: Lee Warner, 1912).
- Mexican Archaeology (London: Lee Warner, 1914).
- Central American and West Indian Archaeology (London: Lee Warner, 1916).
