= Kuba Kingdom =

Kingdom in Central Africa (1625–1884)

Kingdom of Bakuba Kuba
- 1625–1884
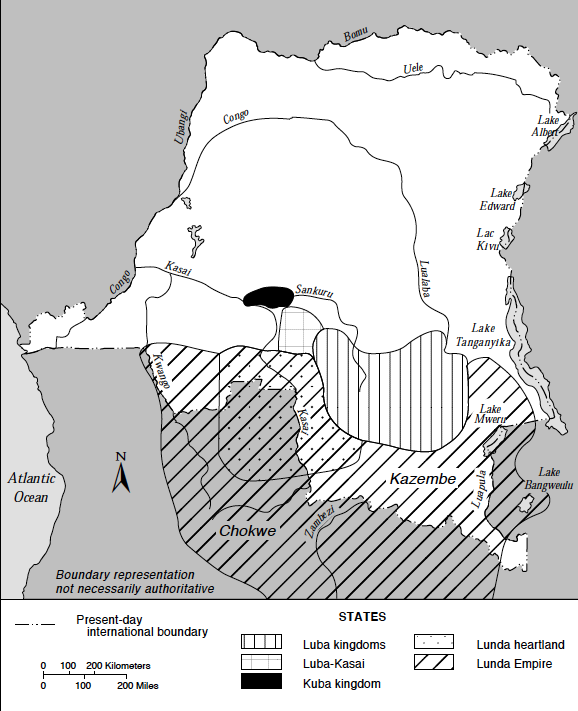
- Map of the Kuba Kingdom, Lunda Empire and Luba kingdoms in the Congo River Basin.
- Official languages: Bushong
- Government: Monarchy
- Nyim
  - 1625: Shyaam a-Mbul a Ngoong
- History
  - Established: 1625
  - Disestablished: 1884
Preceded by	Succeeded by
Bushong culture	International Association of the Congo
- Today part of: Democratic Republic of Congo

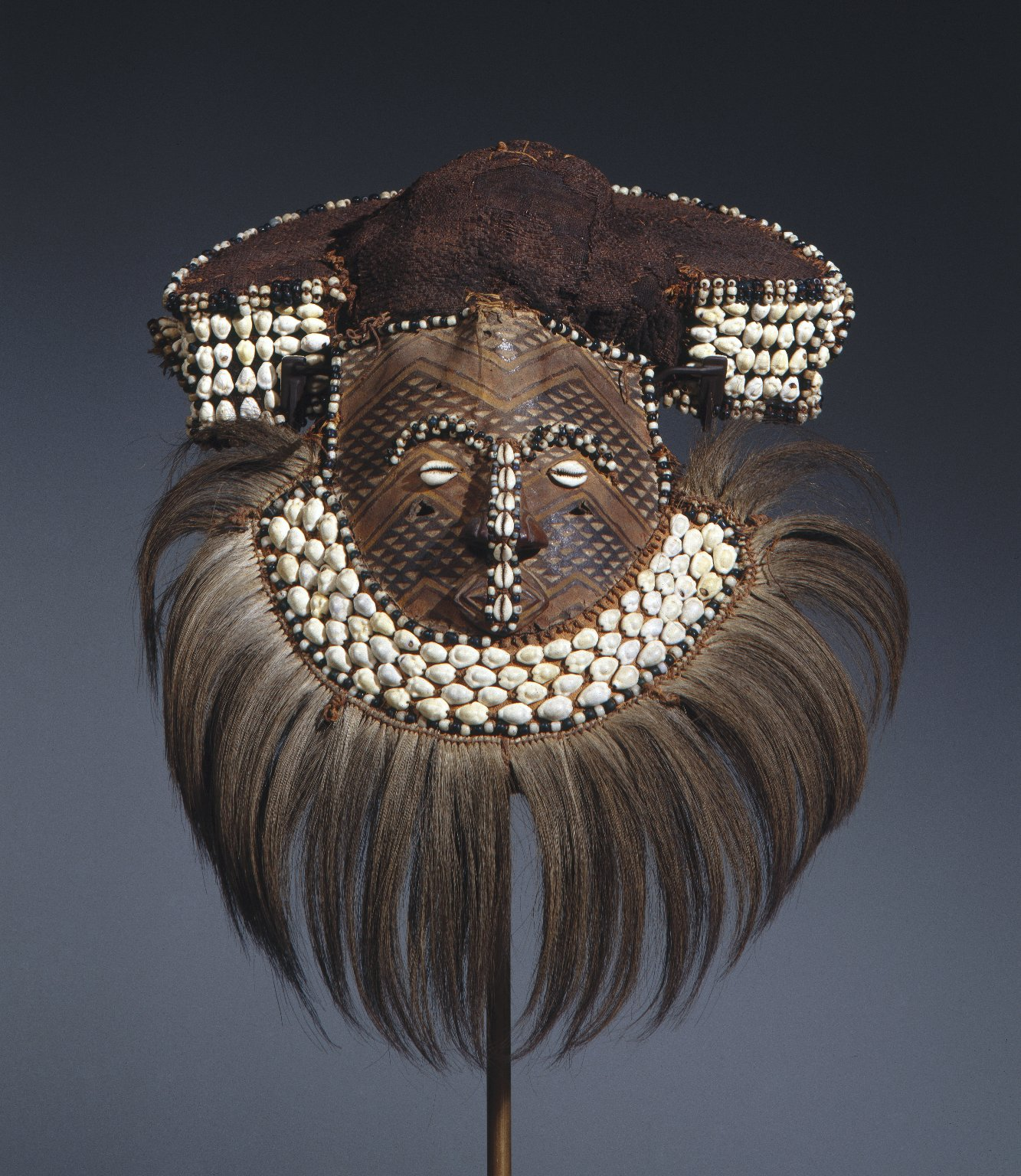
A contemporary Mwaash aMbooy mask, representing Woot, the mythical founder of the Kuba Kingdom

The Kuba Kingdom, also known as the Kingdom of the Bakuba or Bushongo, is a traditional kingdom in Central Africa. The Kuba Kingdom flourished between the 17th and 19th centuries in the region bordered by the Sankuru, Lulua, and Kasai Rivers in the heart of the modern-day Democratic Republic of the Congo.

The Kuba Kingdom was a conglomerate of several smaller Bushong-speaking principalities as well as the Kete, Coofa, Mbeengi, and the Kasai Twa Pygmies. The original Kuba migrated during the 16th century from the north. Nineteen ethnic groups are included in the kingdom, which still exists and is presided over by the King (nyim).

== History ==
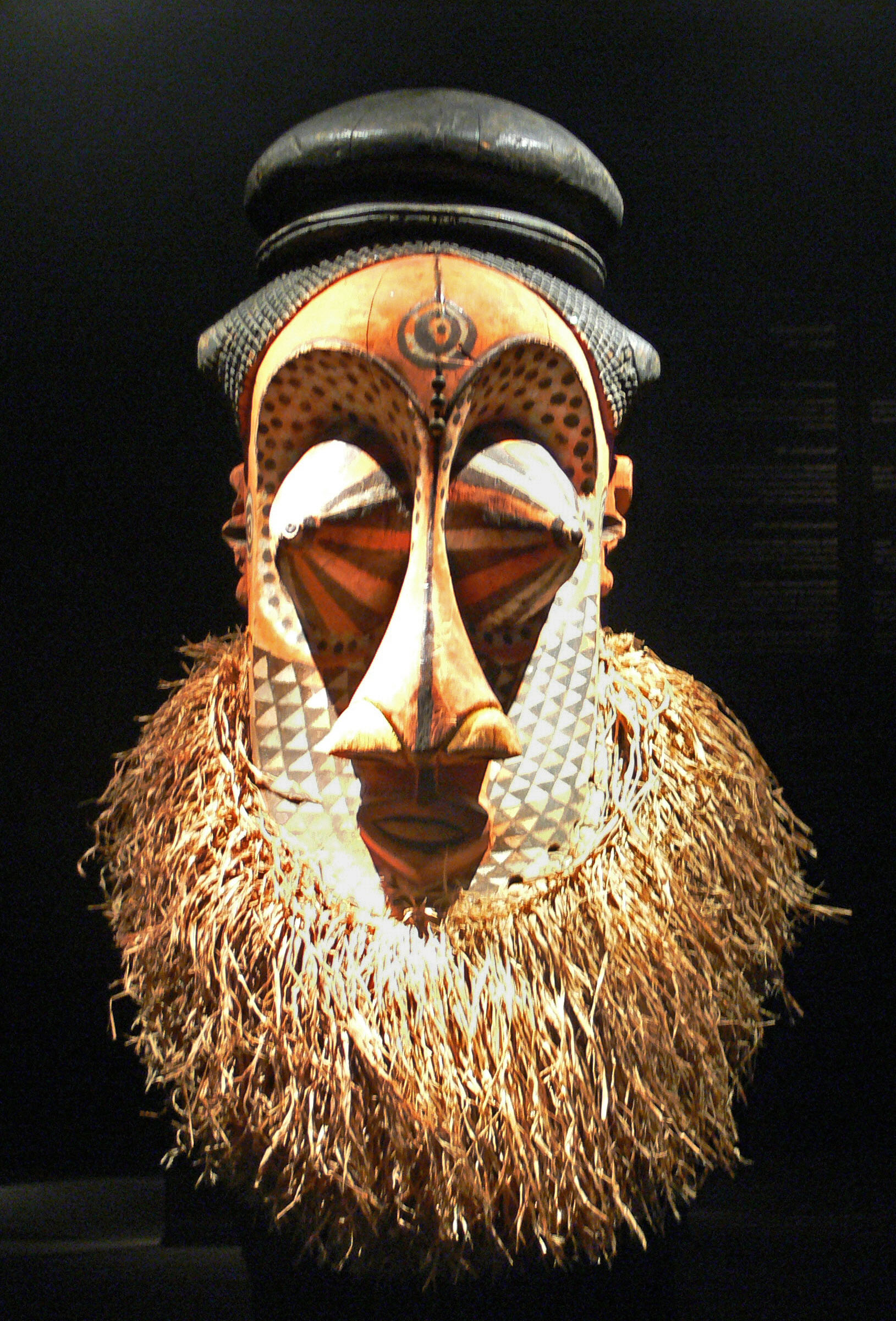
Helmet mask "mulwalwa", Southern Kuba, 19th or early 20th century

=== Shyaam a-Mbul ===
The kingdom began as a conglomeration of several chiefdoms of various ethnic groups with no real central authority. In approximately 1625, an individual from outside the area known as Shyaam a-Mbul a Ngoong usurped the position of one of the area rulers and united all the chiefdoms under his leadership. Tradition states that Shyaam a-Mbul was the adopted son of a Kuba queen. He left the Kuba region to find enlightenment in the Pende and Kongo kingdoms to the west. After learning all he could from these states, he returned to Kuba to form the empire's political, social, and economic foundations.

=== A new government ===
The Kuba government was reorganized toward a merit-based title system, but power still remained firmly in the hands of the aristocracy. The Kuba government was controlled by a king called the nyim who belonged to the Bushoong clan. The king was responsible to a court council of all the Kuba subgroups, who were represented equally before the king by their elites. The kingdom had an unwritten constitution, elected political offices, separation of political powers, a judicial system with courts and juries, a police force, a military, taxation, a significant public goods provision and socially supporting movements.

=== Growth ===
As the kingdom matured, it benefited from advanced techniques adopted from neighboring peoples as well as New World crops introduced from the Americas, such as maize, tobacco, cassava, and beans. Kuba became very wealthy, which resulted in great artistic works commissioned by the Kuba nobility. The Kuba kings retained the most fanciful works for court ceremony and were also buried with these artifacts.

Early in the 18th century, the ruler of Kuba was Kuete M'bogi. During his reign, Kuba extended its power further south along the Kasai River. This expansion was continued under Koto Nche who was also a king of Kuba during the 18th century.

=== Apex ===
The Kuba Kingdom reached its apex during the mid-19th century. Europeans first reached the area in 1884. Because of the kingdom's relative isolation, it was not as affected by the slave trade as were the Kongo and Ndongo kingdoms on the coast.

The current reigning monarch, Kot-a-Mbweeky III, has been on the throne since 1968.

== Kuba culture ==
=== Kuba art ===
The Kuba are known for their raffia embroidered textiles, fiber and beaded hats, carved palm wine cups and cosmetic boxes, but they are most famous for their monumental helmet masks, featuring exquisite geometric patterns, stunning fabrics, seeds, beads, and shells.

The boxes, known as Kuba Boxes and called ngedi mu ntey by the Kuba, are generally used to hold tukula powder and paste. The boxes are usually in the shape of a square with a faceted lid, a semicircle (sometimes referred to as "half moon"), a rectangle, or the shape of a mask. Sometimes they were used for holding razors for cutting raffia, hairpins, or ritual objects.

Tukula (called twool by the Kuba) is a red powder made of ground cam wood. The color red is essential to the Kuba concept of beauty and was therefore used to ornament the face, hair, and chest during dances and important ceremonies, as well as to anoint bodies for burial. Tukula was also mixed with other pigments to dye raffia cloth.

After 1700, King Misha mi-Shyaang a-Mbul introduced wooden sculptures called ndop figures that were carved to resemble the king and represent his individual reign. These figures always included the king's ibol or personal symbol, akin to a personal standard.

The carved palm-wine drinking cups and ornately carved boxes are identified with competition between titled court members among the Kuba. With half of all Bushoong men holding titles in the 1880s, competition for influence was sometimes fierce, and it found expression in the elaboration of these essentially commonplace household objects into works of extraordinary beauty.

=== Kuba religion and mythos ===
The Kuba believed in Bumba the Sky Father who spewed out the sun, moon, stars, and planets. He also created life with the Earth Mother. However, these were somewhat distant deities, and the Kuba placed more immediate concern in a supernatural being named Woot, who named the animals and other things. Woot was the first human and bringer of civilization. The Kuba are sometimes known as the "Children of Woot."

== See also ==
- List of kings of Kuba
- Lunda Kingdom
- Luba Kingdom
- Lozi Kingdom
- William Henry Sheppard
- Bomazi
