= Books Are My Bag Readers' Awards =

British literary award

The Books Are My Bag Readers' Awards are annual literary awards presented by the Booksellers Association in the UK and Ireland since 2016. They are sponsored by National Book Tokens.

== History and administration ==
The awards were launched at the 2016 Booksellers Association conference with the aim of being the first literary awards voted for by the public. A shortlist of books is voted for by bookshops who are members of the Booksellers Association, and the winner of each category is chosen by an online public vote, with over 40,000 people voting in the 2017 awards. The ceremony takes place in November in Foyles bookshop in London.

In 2016, the awards were presented in seven categories: Fiction, Non-Fiction, Biography & Autobiography, Children's, Beautiful Book, Breakthrough Author and Readers' Choice.

In 2017, the Fiction category was renamed Popular Fiction, and three extra categories were added: Novel, Young Adult and Middle Grade. The number of categories and their names continues to fluctuate.

== Shortlist and winners ==
=== 2016 to 2023 ===
Year	Category	Shortlists	Winner
2016	Fiction	Grief Is the Thing with Feathers by Max Porter	Grief Is the Thing with Feathers by Max Porter
2016	Fiction	The Green Road by Anne Enright	Grief Is the Thing with Feathers by Max Porter
2016	Fiction	The Muse by Jessie Burton	Grief Is the Thing with Feathers by Max Porter
2016	Fiction	This Must Be the Place by Maggie O'Farrell	Grief Is the Thing with Feathers by Max Porter
2016	Fiction	The Trouble with Goats and Sheep by Joanna Cannon	Grief Is the Thing with Feathers by Max Porter
2016	Non-Fiction	It's All in Your Head by Suzanne O'Sullivan	Reasons to Stay Alive by Matt Haig
2016	Non-Fiction	Landmarks by Robert Macfarlane	Reasons to Stay Alive by Matt Haig
2016	Non-Fiction	Reasons to Stay Alive by Matt Haig	Reasons to Stay Alive by Matt Haig
2016	Non-Fiction	SPQR: A History of Ancient Rome by Mary Beard	Reasons to Stay Alive by Matt Haig
2016	Non-Fiction	The Silk Roads by Peter Frankopan	Reasons to Stay Alive by Matt Haig
2016	Non-Fiction	When Breath Becomes Air by Paul Kalanithi	Reasons to Stay Alive by Matt Haig
2016	Biography & Autobiography	Alive Alive Oh! by Diana Athill	The Road to Little Dribbling: More Notes From a Small Island by Bill Bryson
2016	Biography & Autobiography	At the Existentialist Café by Sarah Bakewell	The Road to Little Dribbling: More Notes From a Small Island by Bill Bryson
2016	Biography & Autobiography	Fingers in the Sparkle Jar by Chris Packham	The Road to Little Dribbling: More Notes From a Small Island by Bill Bryson
2016	Biography & Autobiography	The Invention of Nature by Andrea Wulf	The Road to Little Dribbling: More Notes From a Small Island by Bill Bryson
2016	Biography & Autobiography	The Last Act of Love by Cathy Rentzenbrink	The Road to Little Dribbling: More Notes From a Small Island by Bill Bryson
2016	Biography & Autobiography	The Road to Little Dribbling: More Notes From a Small Island by Bill Bryson	The Road to Little Dribbling: More Notes From a Small Island by Bill Bryson
2016	Children's	Beetle Boy by M. G. Leonard	The Detective Dog by Julia Donaldson and Sara Ogilvie
2016	Children's	One by Sarah Crossan	The Detective Dog by Julia Donaldson and Sara Ogilvie
2016	Children's	The Bear and the Piano by David Litchfield	The Detective Dog by Julia Donaldson and Sara Ogilvie
2016	Children's	The Day the Crayons Came Home by Drew Daywalt and Oliver Jeffers	The Detective Dog by Julia Donaldson and Sara Ogilvie
2016	Children's	The Detective Dog by Julia Donaldson and Sara Ogilvie	The Detective Dog by Julia Donaldson and Sara Ogilvie
2016	Children's	The Rest of Us Just Live Here by Patrick Ness	The Detective Dog by Julia Donaldson and Sara Ogilvie
2016	Beautiful Book	Cartes Postales from Greece by Victoria Hislop	The Essex Serpent by Sarah Perry
2016	Beautiful Book	Golden Hill by Francis Spufford	The Essex Serpent by Sarah Perry
2016	Beautiful Book	Hag-Seed by Margaret Atwood	The Essex Serpent by Sarah Perry
2016	Beautiful Book	Herbarium by Caz Hildebrand	The Essex Serpent by Sarah Perry
2016	Beautiful Book	The Essex Serpent by Sarah Perry	The Essex Serpent by Sarah Perry
2016	Breakthrough Author	Abi Elphinstone	Joanna Cannon
2016	Breakthrough Author	Amy Liptrot	Joanna Cannon
2016	Breakthrough Author	Andrew Michael Hurley	Joanna Cannon
2016	Breakthrough Author	Han Kang	Joanna Cannon
2016	Breakthrough Author	Joanna Cannon	Joanna Cannon
2016	Breakthrough Author	Kit de Waal	Joanna Cannon
2016	Breakthrough Author	Lisa McInerney	Joanna Cannon
2016	Breakthrough Author	Rowan Hisayo Buchanan	Joanna Cannon
2016	Readers' Choice		The Good Immigrant edited by Nikesh Shukla
2017	Popular Fiction	Eleanor Oliphant Is Completely Fine by Gail Honeyman	How to Stop Time by Matt Haig
2017	Popular Fiction	How to Stop Time by Matt Haig	How to Stop Time by Matt Haig
2017	Popular Fiction	Munich by Robert Harris	How to Stop Time by Matt Haig
2017	Popular Fiction	The Dry by Jane Harper	How to Stop Time by Matt Haig
2017	Popular Fiction	The Keeper of Lost Things by Ruth Hogan	How to Stop Time by Matt Haig
2017	Popular Fiction	The Power by Naomi Alderman	How to Stop Time by Matt Haig
2017	Non-Fiction	East West Street by Philippe Sands	This Is Going to Hurt by Adam Kay
2017	Non-Fiction	Scribbles in the Margins by Daniel Gray	This Is Going to Hurt by Adam Kay
2017	Non-Fiction	The Adversary by Emmanuel Carrère	This Is Going to Hurt by Adam Kay
2017	Non-Fiction	This Is Going to Hurt by Adam Kay	This Is Going to Hurt by Adam Kay
2017	Non-Fiction	Travels with my Sketchbook by Chris Riddell	This Is Going to Hurt by Adam Kay
2017	Non-Fiction	Why I'm No Longer Talking to White People About Race by Reni Eddo-Lodge	This Is Going to Hurt by Adam Kay
2017	Novel	Birdcage Walk by Helen Dunmore	The Underground Railroad by Colson Whitehead
2017	Novel	Conversations with Friends by Sally Rooney	The Underground Railroad by Colson Whitehead
2017	Novel	Hot Milk by Deborah Levy	The Underground Railroad by Colson Whitehead
2017	Novel	Swing Time by Zadie Smith	The Underground Railroad by Colson Whitehead
2017	Novel	The End We Start From by Megan Hunter	The Underground Railroad by Colson Whitehead
2017	Novel	The Underground Railroad by Colson Whitehead	The Underground Railroad by Colson Whitehead
2017	Young Adult	Piglettes by Clémentine Beauvais	The Hate U Give by Angie Thomas
2017	Young Adult	Release by Patrick Ness	The Hate U Give by Angie Thomas
2017	Young Adult	Ink by Alice Broadway	The Hate U Give by Angie Thomas
2017	Young Adult	The Hate U Give by Angie Thomas	The Hate U Give by Angie Thomas
2017	Young Adult	Things a Bright Girl Can Do by Sally Nicholls	The Hate U Give by Angie Thomas
2017	Young Adult	Welcome to Nowhere by Elizabeth Laird	The Hate U Give by Angie Thomas
2017	Middle Grade	Letters From the Lighthouse by Emma Carroll	Letters From the Lighthouse by Emma Carroll
2017	Middle Grade	Moonlocket by Peter Bunzl	Letters From the Lighthouse by Emma Carroll
2017	Middle Grade	Radio Boy by Christian O'Connell	Letters From the Lighthouse by Emma Carroll
2017	Middle Grade	The Explorer by Katherine Rundell	Letters From the Lighthouse by Emma Carroll
2017	Middle Grade	The Guggenheim Mystery by Robin Stephens and Siobhan Dowd	Letters From the Lighthouse by Emma Carroll
2017	Middle Grade	Who Let the Gods Out by Maz Evans	Letters From the Lighthouse by Emma Carroll
2017	Beautiful Book	As Kingfishers Catch Fire by Alex Preston and Neil Gower	The Lost Words by Robert Macfarlane and Jackie Morris
2017	Beautiful Book	Homegoing by Yaa Gyasi	The Lost Words by Robert Macfarlane and Jackie Morris
2017	Beautiful Book	Ravilious & Co by Andy Friend	The Lost Words by Robert Macfarlane and Jackie Morris
2017	Beautiful Book	Tangleweed and Brine by Deirdre Sullivan	The Lost Words by Robert Macfarlane and Jackie Morris
2017	Beautiful Book	The Bedlam Stacks by Natasha Pulley	The Lost Words by Robert Macfarlane and Jackie Morris
2017	Beautiful Book	The Lost Words by Robert Macfarlane and Jackie Morris	The Lost Words by Robert Macfarlane and Jackie Morris
2017	Breakthrough Author	Abir Mukherjee	Kae Tempest
2017	Breakthrough Author	Édouard Louis	Kae Tempest
2017	Breakthrough Author	Fiona Mozley	Kae Tempest
2017	Breakthrough Author	Harriet Cummings	Kae Tempest
2017	Breakthrough Author	Kae Tempest	Kae Tempest
2017	Breakthrough Author	Mary Paulson-Ellis	Kae Tempest
2017	Readers' Choice		This Is Going to Hurt by Adam Kay
2018	Novel	Home Fire by Kamila Shamsie	The Seven Deaths of Evelyn Hardcastle by Stuart Turton
2018	Novel	Midwinter Break by Bernard MacLaverty	The Seven Deaths of Evelyn Hardcastle by Stuart Turton
2018	Novel	The Mermaid and Mrs Hancock by Imogen Hermes Gowar	The Seven Deaths of Evelyn Hardcastle by Stuart Turton
2018	Novel	The Music Shop by Rachel Joyce	The Seven Deaths of Evelyn Hardcastle by Stuart Turton
2018	Novel	The Seven Deaths of Evelyn Hardcastle by Stuart Turton	The Seven Deaths of Evelyn Hardcastle by Stuart Turton
2018	Novel	Tin Man by Sarah Winman	The Seven Deaths of Evelyn Hardcastle by Stuart Turton
2018	Non-Fiction	Educated by Tara Westover	The Secret Barrister: Stories of the Law and How It's Broken by The Secret Barrister
2018	Non-Fiction	How Not to Be a Boy by Robert Webb	The Secret Barrister: Stories of the Law and How It's Broken by The Secret Barrister
2018	Non-Fiction	I Am, I Am, I Am by Maggie O'Farrell	The Secret Barrister: Stories of the Law and How It's Broken by The Secret Barrister
2018	Non-Fiction	Notes on a Nervous Planet by Matt Haig	The Secret Barrister: Stories of the Law and How It's Broken by The Secret Barrister
2018	Non-Fiction	The Diary of a Bookseller by Shaun Bythell	The Secret Barrister: Stories of the Law and How It's Broken by The Secret Barrister
2018	Non-Fiction	The Secret Barrister: Stories of the Law and How It's Broken by The Secret Barrister	The Secret Barrister: Stories of the Law and How It's Broken by The Secret Barrister
2018	Poetry	100 Poems by Seamus Heaney	The Last Hedgehog by Pam Ayres
2018	Poetry	England: Poems from a School edited by Kate Clanchy	The Last Hedgehog by Pam Ayres
2018	Poetry	Off the Shelf edited by Carol Ann Duffy	The Last Hedgehog by Pam Ayres
2018	Poetry	She Must Be Mad by Charly Cox	The Last Hedgehog by Pam Ayres
2018	Poetry	The Last Hedgehog by Pam Ayres	The Last Hedgehog by Pam Ayres
2018	Poetry	The Poetry Pharmacy by William Sieghart	The Last Hedgehog by Pam Ayres
2018	Young Adult	A Skinful of Shadows by Frances Hardinge	La Belle Sauvage: The Book of Dust Volume One by Philip Pullman
2018	Young Adult	A Sky Painted Gold by Laura Wood	La Belle Sauvage: The Book of Dust Volume One by Philip Pullman
2018	Young Adult	Bookshop Girl by Chloe Coles	La Belle Sauvage: The Book of Dust Volume One by Philip Pullman
2018	Young Adult	Children of Blood and Bone by Tomi Adeyemi	La Belle Sauvage: The Book of Dust Volume One by Philip Pullman
2018	Young Adult	La Belle Sauvage: The Book of Dust Volume One by Philip Pullman	La Belle Sauvage: The Book of Dust Volume One by Philip Pullman
2018	Young Adult	Where the World Ends by Geraldine McCaughrean	La Belle Sauvage: The Book of Dust Volume One by Philip Pullman
2018	Middle Grade	A Spoonful of Murder by Robin Stevens	The Storm Keeper's Island by Catherine Doyle
2018	Middle Grade	Brightstorm by Vashti Hardy	The Storm Keeper's Island by Catherine Doyle
2018	Middle Grade	Nevermoor by Jessica Townsend	The Storm Keeper's Island by Catherine Doyle
2018	Middle Grade	Stories for Boys Who Dare to be Different by Ben Brooks and Quinton Winter	The Storm Keeper's Island by Catherine Doyle
2018	Middle Grade	The 1,000-year-old Boy by Ross Welford	The Storm Keeper's Island by Catherine Doyle
2018	Middle Grade	The Storm Keeper's Island by Catherine Doyle	The Storm Keeper's Island by Catherine Doyle
2018	Beautiful Book	A Sky Painted Gold by Laura Wood	Virago Modern Classics 40th anniversary series designed by Hannah Wood, illustrated by Yehrin Tong
2018	Beautiful Book	Bookworm by Lucy Mangan	Virago Modern Classics 40th anniversary series designed by Hannah Wood, illustrated by Yehrin Tong
2018	Beautiful Book	Life in the Garden by Penelope Lively	Virago Modern Classics 40th anniversary series designed by Hannah Wood, illustrated by Yehrin Tong
2018	Beautiful Book	The Librarian by Salley Vickers	Virago Modern Classics 40th anniversary series designed by Hannah Wood, illustrated by Yehrin Tong
2018	Beautiful Book	The Wood: The Life & Times of Cockshutt Wood by John Lewis-Stempel	Virago Modern Classics 40th anniversary series designed by Hannah Wood, illustrated by Yehrin Tong
2018	Beautiful Book	Virago Modern Classics 40th anniversary series designed by Hannah Wood, illustrated by Yehrin Tong	Virago Modern Classics 40th anniversary series designed by Hannah Wood, illustrated by Yehrin Tong
2018	Breakthrough Author	A J Pearce	Sarah J. Harris
2018	Breakthrough Author	Joe Heap	Sarah J. Harris
2018	Breakthrough Author	Laura Carlin	Sarah J. Harris
2018	Breakthrough Author	Polly Clark	Sarah J. Harris
2018	Breakthrough Author	Preti Taneja	Sarah J. Harris
2018	Breakthrough Author	Sarah J. Harris	Sarah J. Harris
2018	Breakthrough Author	Sophie Mackintosh	Sarah J. Harris
2018	Breakthrough Author	Tommy Orange	Sarah J. Harris
2018	Readers' Choice		Eleanor Oliphant Is Completely Fine by Gail Honeyman
2018	Outstanding Contribution to Bookselling		Vivian Archer, Newham Bookshop
2019	Fiction	Lanny by Max Porter	Circe by Madeline Miller
2019	Fiction	Circe by Madeline Miller	Circe by Madeline Miller
2019	Fiction	An American Marriage by Tayari Jones	Circe by Madeline Miller
2019	Fiction	The Binding by Bridget Collins	Circe by Madeline Miller
2019	Fiction	Leonard and Hungry Paul by Ronan Hession	Circe by Madeline Miller
2019	Fiction	Washington Black by Esi Edugyan	Circe by Madeline Miller
2019	Non-Fiction	The Salt Path by Raynor Winn	Becoming by Michelle Obama
2019	Non-Fiction	Wilding: The Return of Nature to a British Farm by Isabella Tree	Becoming by Michelle Obama
2019	Non-Fiction	No One Is Too Small to Make a Difference by Greta Thunberg	Becoming by Michelle Obama
2019	Non-Fiction	Becoming by Michelle Obama	Becoming by Michelle Obama
2019	Non-Fiction	Invisible Women: Exposing Data Bias in a World Designed for Men by Caroline Criado Perez	Becoming by Michelle Obama
2019	Non-Fiction	A Honeybee Heart Has Five Openings by Helen Jukes	Becoming by Michelle Obama
2019	Poetry	The Flame by Leonard Cohen	The Flame by Leonard Cohen
2019	Poetry	Poems to Fall in Love With by Chris Riddell	The Flame by Leonard Cohen
2019	Poetry	The Poetry Pharmacy Returns by William Sieghart	The Flame by Leonard Cohen
2019	Poetry	The Black Flamingo by Dean Atta	The Flame by Leonard Cohen
2019	Poetry	The Girl Aquarium by Jen Campbell	The Flame by Leonard Cohen
2019	Poetry	A Year of Nature Poems by Joseph Coelho and Kelly Louise Judd	The Flame by Leonard Cohen
2019	Young Adult	On the Come Up by Angie Thomas	Toffee by Sarah Crossan
2019	Young Adult	"I Will Not Be Erased": Our stories about growing up as people of colour by gal-dem	Toffee by Sarah Crossan
2019	Young Adult	Proud by various authors with foreword by Juno Dawson	Toffee by Sarah Crossan
2019	Young Adult	Toffee by Sarah Crossan	Toffee by Sarah Crossan
2019	Young Adult	Becoming Dinah by Kit de Waal	Toffee by Sarah Crossan
2019	Young Adult	Heartstopper Volume 1 by Alice Oseman	Toffee by Sarah Crossan
2019	Children's Fiction	Julián Is a Mermaid by Jessica Love	No Ballet Shoes In Syria by Catherine Bruton
2019	Children's Fiction	Malamander by Thomas Taylor	No Ballet Shoes In Syria by Catherine Bruton
2019	Children's Fiction	Tilly and the Bookwanderers by Anna James	No Ballet Shoes In Syria by Catherine Bruton
2019	Children's Fiction	No Ballet Shoes In Syria by Catherine Bruton	No Ballet Shoes In Syria by Catherine Bruton
2019	Children's Fiction	Rumblestar by Abi Elphinstone	No Ballet Shoes In Syria by Catherine Bruton
2019	Children's Fiction	The Good Thieves by Katherine Rundell	No Ballet Shoes In Syria by Catherine Bruton
2019	Beautiful Book	Circe by Madeline Miller	The Binding by Bridget Collins
2019	Beautiful Book	The Binding by Bridget Collins	The Binding by Bridget Collins
2019	Beautiful Book	The Lost Words: Spell Songs by various including Robert Macfarlane and Jackie Morris	The Binding by Bridget Collins
2019	Beautiful Book	How To Eat a Peach by Diana Henry	The Binding by Bridget Collins
2019	Beautiful Book	Migrations: Open Hearts, Open Borders with foreword by Shaun Tan	The Binding by Bridget Collins
2019	Beautiful Book	All the Ways to be Smart by Davina Bell and Allison Colpoys	The Binding by Bridget Collins
2019	Breakthrough Author	Candice Carty-Williams	Greta Thunberg
2019	Breakthrough Author	Raynor Winn	Greta Thunberg
2019	Breakthrough Author	Ocean Vuong	Greta Thunberg
2019	Breakthrough Author	Onjali Q. Raúf	Greta Thunberg
2019	Breakthrough Author	Greta Thunberg	Greta Thunberg
2019	Breakthrough Author	Kerry Hudson	Greta Thunberg
2019	Readers' Choice		Invisible Women: Exposing Data Bias in a World Designed for Men by Caroline Criado Perez
2019	Outstanding Contribution to Bookselling		Trevor Goul-Wheeker, former chairman at Blackwell's
2020	Fiction	Boy Parts by Eliza Clark	The Devil and the Dark Water by Stuart Turton
2020	Fiction	The Devil and the Dark Water by Stuart Turton	The Devil and the Dark Water by Stuart Turton
2020	Fiction	Kim Ji-young, Born 1982 by Cho Nam-joo	The Devil and the Dark Water by Stuart Turton
2020	Fiction	The Vanishing Half by Brit Bennett	The Devil and the Dark Water by Stuart Turton
2020	Fiction	Weather by Jenny Offill	The Devil and the Dark Water by Stuart Turton
2020	Non-Fiction	The Dance Cure by Dr Peter Lovatt	Diary of a Young Naturalist by Dara McAnulty
2020	Non-Fiction	Diary of a Young Naturalist by Dara McAnulty	Diary of a Young Naturalist by Dara McAnulty
2020	Non-Fiction	Humankind: A Hopeful History by Rutger Bregman	Diary of a Young Naturalist by Dara McAnulty
2020	Non-Fiction	Insurgent Empire: Anticolonial Resistance and British Dissent by Priyamvada Gopal	Diary of a Young Naturalist by Dara McAnulty
2020	Poetry	Homie by Danez Smith	Tiger, Tiger Burning Bright: An Animal Poem for Every Day of the Year by Britta Teckentrup and Fiona Waters
2020	Poetry	Seagull Seagull by James K. Baxter	Tiger, Tiger Burning Bright: An Animal Poem for Every Day of the Year by Britta Teckentrup and Fiona Waters
2020	Poetry	Sylvanian Family by Summer Young	Tiger, Tiger Burning Bright: An Animal Poem for Every Day of the Year by Britta Teckentrup and Fiona Waters
2020	Poetry	Tiger, Tiger Burning Bright: An Animal Poem for Every Day of the Year by Britta Teckentrup and Fiona Waters	Tiger, Tiger Burning Bright: An Animal Poem for Every Day of the Year by Britta Teckentrup and Fiona Waters
2020	Young Adult Fiction	Children of Virtue and Vengeance by Tomi Adeyemi	Cinderella Is Dead by Kalynn Bayron
2020	Young Adult Fiction	Cinderella Is Dead by Kalynn Bayron	Cinderella Is Dead by Kalynn Bayron
2020	Young Adult Fiction	The Crossover: Graphic Novel by Kwame Alexander	Cinderella Is Dead by Kalynn Bayron
2020	Young Adult Fiction	Heartstopper Vol 3 by Alice Oseman	Cinderella Is Dead by Kalynn Bayron
2020	Children's Fiction	A Kind of Spark by Elle McNicoll	The Highland Falcon Thief by M. G. Leonard & Sam Sedgman
2020	Children's Fiction	Blended by Sharon Draper	The Highland Falcon Thief by M. G. Leonard & Sam Sedgman
2020	Children's Fiction	Gargantis by Thomas Taylor	The Highland Falcon Thief by M. G. Leonard & Sam Sedgman
2020	Children's Fiction	The Highland Falcon Thief by M. G. Leonard & Sam Sedgman	The Highland Falcon Thief by M. G. Leonard & Sam Sedgman
2020	Breakthrough Author	Brit Bennett	Jean Menzies
2020	Breakthrough Author	Jean Menzies	Jean Menzies
2020	Breakthrough Author	Kiley Reid	Jean Menzies
2020	Breakthrough Author	Douglas Stuart	Jean Menzies
2020	Readers' Choice		Hamnet by Maggie O'Farrell
2021	Fiction	Still Life by Sarah Winman	Still Life by Sarah Winman
2021	Fiction	Assembly by Natasha Brown	Still Life by Sarah Winman
2021	Fiction	Panenka by Rónán Hession	Still Life by Sarah Winman
2021	Fiction	The Appeal by Janice Hallett	Still Life by Sarah Winman
2021	Non-Fiction	The Power of Geography by Tim Marshall	I Belong Here by Anita Sethi
2021	Non-Fiction	Ancestors by Alice Roberts	I Belong Here by Anita Sethi
2021	Non-Fiction	The Book of Trespass by Nick Hayes	I Belong Here by Anita Sethi
2021	Non-Fiction	I Belong Here by Anita Sethi	I Belong Here by Anita Sethi
2021	Poetry	The Hill We Climb by Amanda Gorman	The Hill We Climb by Amanda Gorman
2021	Poetry	Slug by Hollie McNish	The Hill We Climb by Amanda Gorman
2021	Poetry	Empty Nest by Carol Ann Duffy	The Hill We Climb by Amanda Gorman
2021	Poetry	The Heeding by Rob Cowen & Nick Hayes	The Hill We Climb by Amanda Gorman
2021	Young Adult Fiction	The Great Godden by Meg Rosoff	Ace of Spades by Faridah Àbíké-Íyímídé
2021	Young Adult Fiction	The Outlaws Scarlett and Browne by Jonathan Stroud	Ace of Spades by Faridah Àbíké-Íyímídé
2021	Young Adult Fiction	Ace of Spades by Faridah Àbíké-Íyímídé	Ace of Spades by Faridah Àbíké-Íyímídé
2021	Young Adult Fiction	All Our Hidden Gifts by Caroline O'Donoghue	Ace of Spades by Faridah Àbíké-Íyímídé
2021	Children's Fiction	Amari and the Night Brothers by BB Alston	When the Sky Falls by Phil Earle
2021	Children's Fiction	Show Us Who You Are by Elle McNicoll	When the Sky Falls by Phil Earle
2021	Children's Fiction	By Ash, Oak and Thorn by Melissa Harrison	When the Sky Falls by Phil Earle
2021	Children's Fiction	When the Sky Falls by Phil Earle	When the Sky Falls by Phil Earle
2021	Breakthrough Author	Dara McAnulty	Marcus Rashford
2021	Breakthrough Author	Elle McNicoll	Marcus Rashford
2021	Breakthrough Author	Monique Roffey	Marcus Rashford
2021	Breakthrough Author	Marcus Rashford	Marcus Rashford
2021	Readers' Choice		The Thursday Murder Club by Richard Osman
2022	Fiction	Heaven by Mieko Kawakami	Her Majesty's Royal Coven by Juno Dawson
2022	Fiction	Her Majesty's Royal Coven by Juno Dawson	Her Majesty's Royal Coven by Juno Dawson
2022	Fiction	Our Wives Under the Sea by Julia Armfield	Her Majesty's Royal Coven by Juno Dawson
2022	Fiction	Tomorrow, and Tomorrow, and Tomorrow by Gabrielle Zevin	Her Majesty's Royal Coven by Juno Dawson
2022	Non-Fiction	Ghost Signs by Stu Hennigan	The Transgender Issue by Shon Faye
2022	Non-Fiction	Otherlands: A World in the Making by Thomas Halliday	The Transgender Issue by Shon Faye
2022	Non-Fiction	The Transgender Issue by Shon Faye	The Transgender Issue by Shon Faye
2022	Non-Fiction	Without Warnings and Only Sometimes by Kit de Waal	The Transgender Issue by Shon Faye
2022	Poetry	Bless the Daughter Raised by a Voice in her Head by Warsan Shire	The Fire People: A Collection of British Black and Asian Poetry by Lemn Sissay
2022	Poetry	The Fire People: A Collection of British Black and Asian Poetry by Lemn Sissay	The Fire People: A Collection of British Black and Asian Poetry by Lemn Sissay
2022	Poetry	Limbic by Peter Scalpello	The Fire People: A Collection of British Black and Asian Poetry by Lemn Sissay
2022	Poetry	100 Queer Poems edited by Mary Jean Chan and Andrew McMillan	The Fire People: A Collection of British Black and Asian Poetry by Lemn Sissay
2022	Young Adult Fiction	All That's Left in the World by Erik J. Brown	All That's Left in the World by Erik J. Brown
2022	Young Adult Fiction	I Kissed Shara Wheeler by Casey McQuiston	All That's Left in the World by Erik J. Brown
2022	Young Adult Fiction	The King Is Dead by Benjamin Dean	All That's Left in the World by Erik J. Brown
2022	Young Adult Fiction	When Our Worlds Collided by Danielle Jawando	All That's Left in the World by Erik J. Brown
2022	Children's Fiction	Grimwood: Let the Fur Fly! by Nadia Shireen	Loki: A Bad God's Guide to Being Good by Louie Stowell
2022	Children's Fiction	Like a Charm by Elle McNicoll	Loki: A Bad God's Guide to Being Good by Louie Stowell
2022	Children's Fiction	Loki: A Bad God's Guide to Being Good by Louie Stowell	Loki: A Bad God's Guide to Being Good by Louie Stowell
2022	Children's Fiction	Skandar and the Unicorn Thief by A. F. Steadman	Loki: A Bad God's Guide to Being Good by Louie Stowell
2022	Breakthrough Author	Mieko Kawakami	Alice Oseman
2022	Breakthrough Author	Alice Oseman	Alice Oseman
2022	Breakthrough Author	Jamie Smart	Alice Oseman
2022	Breakthrough Author	Gabrielle Zevin	Alice Oseman
2022	Readers' Choice		Heartstopper by Alice Oseman
2023	Fiction	Tomorrow, and Tomorrow, and Tomorrow by Gabrielle Zevin	Tomorrow, and Tomorrow, and Tomorrow by Gabrielle Zevin
2023	Fiction	Demon Copperhead by Barbara Kingsolver	Tomorrow, and Tomorrow, and Tomorrow by Gabrielle Zevin
2023	Fiction	Sea of Tranquility by Emily St. John Mandel	Tomorrow, and Tomorrow, and Tomorrow by Gabrielle Zevin
2023	Fiction	Yellowface by Rebecca F. Kuang	Tomorrow, and Tomorrow, and Tomorrow by Gabrielle Zevin
2023	Non-Fiction	Ultra Processed People by Chris van Tulleken	Strong Female Character by Fern Brady
2023	Non-Fiction	Why Women Grow by Alice Vincent	Strong Female Character by Fern Brady
2023	Non-Fiction	Pageboy by Elliot Page	Strong Female Character by Fern Brady
2023	Non-Fiction	Strong Female Character by Fern Brady	Strong Female Character by Fern Brady
2023	Poetry	Divisible By Itself and One by Kae Tempest	The Cat Prince & Other Poems by Michael Pedersen
2023	Poetry	More Fiya by Kayo Chingonyi	The Cat Prince & Other Poems by Michael Pedersen
2023	Poetry	Bad Diaspora Poems by Momtaza Mehri	The Cat Prince & Other Poems by Michael Pedersen
2023	Poetry	The Cat Prince & Other Poems by Michael Pedersen	The Cat Prince & Other Poems by Michael Pedersen
2023	Young Adult Fiction	Gwen and Art Are Not in Love by Lex Croucher	Gwen and Art Are Not in Love by Lex Croucher
2023	Young Adult Fiction	Promise Boys by Nick Brooks	Gwen and Art Are Not in Love by Lex Croucher
2023	Young Adult Fiction	The Lesbiana's Guide to Catholic School by Sonora Reyes	Gwen and Art Are Not in Love by Lex Croucher
2023	Young Adult Fiction	Girl, Goddess, Queen by Bea Fitzgerald	Gwen and Art Are Not in Love by Lex Croucher
2023	Children's Fiction	Jamie by L. D. Lapinski	Impossible Creatures by Katherine Rundell
2023	Children's Fiction	Impossible Creatures by Katherine Rundell	Impossible Creatures by Katherine Rundell
2023	Children's Fiction	The Skull by Jon Klassen	Impossible Creatures by Katherine Rundell
2023	Children's Fiction	Greenwild by Pari Thomson, illustrated by Elisa Paganelli	Impossible Creatures by Katherine Rundell
2023	Breakthrough Author	Rebecca F. Kuang	Bonnie Garmus
2023	Breakthrough Author	Bonnie Garmus	Bonnie Garmus
2023	Breakthrough Author	Nana Kwame Adjei-Brenyah	Bonnie Garmus
2023	Breakthrough Author	Sheena Patel	Bonnie Garmus
2023	Readers' Choice		Lessons in Chemistry by Bonnie Garmus

=== 2024 onwards ===
Year	Category	Author	Title	Result	Reference
2024	Fiction	David Nicholls	You Are Here	Winner	
2024	Fiction	Kaveh Akbar	Martyr!	Shortlisted	
2024	Fiction	Carys Davies	Clear	Shortlisted	
2024	Fiction	Ferdia Lennon	Glorious Exploits	Shortlisted	
2024	Non-fiction	Chris Broad	Abroad in Japan	Winner	
2024	Non-fiction	Manni Coe and Reuben Coe	brother. do. you. love. me.	Shortlisted	
2024	Non-fiction	Noreen Masud	A Flat Place	Shortlisted	
2024	Non-fiction	Rory Stewart	Politics on the Edge	Shortlisted	
2024	Poetry	Hollie McNish	Lobster: And Other Things I’m Learning to Love	Winner	
2024	Poetry	Charlie Castelletti	He, She, They, Us	Shortlisted	
2024	Poetry	Gboyega Odubanjo	Adam	Shortlisted	
2024	Poetry	Len Pennie	Poyums	Shortlisted	
2024	Young Adult Fiction	Holly Jackson	The Reappearance of Rachel Price	Winner	
2024	Young Adult Fiction	Phil Earle	Northern Soul	Shortlisted	
2024	Young Adult Fiction	Hafsah Faizal	A Tempest of Tea	Shortlisted	
2024	Young Adult Fiction	Elle McNicoll	Some Like It Cold	Shortlisted	
2024	Children's Fiction	Ross Montgomery	I Am Rebel	Winner	
2024	Children's Fiction	X Fang	Dim Sum Palace	Shortlisted	
2024	Children's Fiction	Tom Percival	Bea's Bad Day	Shortlisted	
2024	Children's Fiction	Sam Sedgman	The Clockwork Conspiracy	Shortlisted	
2024	Breakthrough Author	Asako Yuzuki		Winner	
2024	Breakthrough Author	Julia Armfield		Shortlisted	
2024	Breakthrough Author	Kaliane Bradley		Shortlisted	
2024	Breakthrough Author	Jamie Smart		Shortlisted	
2024	Readers' Choice	Chris Broad	Abroad in Japan	Winner	
2025	Fiction	Elizabeth Strout	Tell Me Everything	Winner	
2025	Fiction	Niamh Ní Mhaoileoin	Ordinary Saints	Shortlisted	
2025	Fiction	Lucy Rose	The Lamb	Shortlisted	
2025	Fiction	Nussaibah Younis	Fundamentally	Shortlisted	
2025	Non-fiction	Chloe Dalton	Raising Hare	Winner	
2025	Non-fiction	Gillian Anderson	Want	Shortlisted	
2025	Non-fiction	John Green	Everything is Tuberculosis	Shortlisted	
2025	Non-fiction	Ian Leslie	John and Paul	Shortlisted	
2025	Poetry	Donna Ashworth	To the Women	Winner	
2025	Poetry	Simon Armitage	Dwell	Shortlisted	
2025	Poetry	Salena Godden	With Love, Grief and Fury	Shortlisted	
2025	Poetry	Len Pennie	poyums annaw	Shortlisted	
2025	Young Adult Fiction	Elle McNicoll	Wish You Were Her	Winner	
2025	Young Adult Fiction	Nathanael Lessore	What Happens Online	Shortlisted	
2025	Young Adult Fiction	Gráinne O’Brien	Solo	Shortlisted	
2025	Young Adult Fiction	Caroline O'Donoghue	Skipshock	Shortlisted	
2025	Children's Fiction	Katherine Rundell	Impossible Creatures: The Poisoned King	Winner	
2025	Children's Fiction	Janice Hallett	A Box Full of Murders	Shortlisted	
2025	Children's Fiction	Anna James and Matthew Land (illus.)	Alice With a Why	Shortlisted	
2025	Children's Fiction	Kristina Rahim	The Doughnut Club	Shortlisted	
2025	Picture Book	Catherine Rayner	Otto the Top Dog	Winner	
2025	Picture Book	Huw Aaron	Sleep Tight, Disgusting Blob	Shortlisted	
2025	Picture Book	Julia Donaldson	Gozzle	Shortlisted	
2025	Picture Book	Paddy Donnelly	Badger Books	Shortlisted	
2025	Newcomer of the Year	Emma Swan	Cruise Ship Kid: Thief At Sea!	Winner	
2025	Newcomer of the Year	Oisín McKenna	Evening and Weekends	Shortlisted	
2025	Newcomer of the Year	Niamh Ní Mhaoileoin	Ordinary Saints	Shortlisted	
2025	Newcomer of the Year	Aisling Rawle	The Compound	Shortlisted	
2025	Readers' Choice	Emma Swan	Cruise Ship Kid: Thief At Sea!	Winner	
