= Michael Pedersen (writer) =

Scottish poet and author

- Pedersen in 2024
- Born: June 16, 1984 (age 42); Edinburgh, Scotland
- Occupations: Poet, writer, author
- Writing career
- Genres: Poetry, prose, spoken word
- Notable awards: 2014 - John Mather Trust Rising Star of Literature Award; 2015 - Robert Louis Stevenson Fellowship; 2023 - Best Poetry, Books Are My Bag Readers' Awards
- Website: www.michaelpedersen.co.uk

Michael Pedersen (born 16 June 1984) is a Scottish poet, author and spoken word performer. Alongside his writing, he co-founded the Edinburgh arts collective Neu! Reekie! which existed from 2010 to 2022. He is the current Edinburgh Makar and writer-in-residence at The University of Edinburgh.

Pedersen released his debut novel, Muckle Flugga, in 2025. It was shortlisted for Scotland's National Book Awards fiction book of the year. He has also written three books of poetry, Play with Me (2013), Oyster (2017) and The Cat Prince & Other Poems (2023), and Boy Friends (2022), an autobiographical work of prose focusing on male friendships, following the death of his friend Scott Hutchison.

== Career ==
Pedersen started writing in Scots for his Portobello, Edinburgh high school magazine. He studied law at Durham University (2002–2005) and lived in London for several years before returning to Scotland and turning to writing and publishing full-time. Pedersen published two chapbooks before compiling his first full poetry collection, Play with Me, in 2013.

In 2010, Pedersen co-founded with poet Kevin Williamson the Edinburgh collective Neu! Reekie!. Through it they produced some 200 showcases for poetry, music and arts, and published writings and poetry compilations. Pedersen continued to be heavily involved with Neu! Reekie! until its winding down in 2022.

Pedersen won the John Mather Trust Rising Star of Literature grant in 2014 and was awarded the Robert Louis Stevenson fellowship in 2015, which allows for a residency at Hôtel Chevillon International Arts Centre at Grez-sur-Loing, France.

Pedersen had developed a close friendship with musician and illustrator Scott Hutchison. In 2017 he released his second poetry collection, Oyster, accompanied by illustrations from Hutchison. The publication led to joint performances of poetry and music across the UK and in South Africa. 2017 also saw the establishment of the Cold Turkey evenings around the festive season in December, which include performances from Pedersen, Hollie McNish, Withered Hand and special guests. That year's show featured Hutchison.

The pair's performances continued into 2018, but the tour was cut short by Hutchison's death by suicide in May 2018, shortly before the two were due to make an appearance at the Ullapool Book Festival. Pedersen, McNish and Withered Hand performed at the 2019 festival as a memorial to Hutchison. Pedersen also performed at the Edinburgh International Book Festival leading a night titled "Good Grief!", where he and other performers discussed grief and healing.

In mid-2018, Pedersen took up a writing residency at the Bill Drummond-owned Curfew Tower in Cushendall, Northern Ireland, where he began working on new material. It ended up the base for his next work, the prose book Boy Friends.

2022 saw the release of Boy Friends, an autobiographical work of prose dealing with male friendships, much of it regarding the kinship with Hutchison and dealing with his loss. The book received wide publicity and acclaim.

In 2023, Pedersen released a new collection of poems, The Cat Prince & Other Poems, some of whom were written during the extensive work on Boy Friends. The poem "The Cat Prince" was shortlisted for the 2023 Forward Prize for Best Single Poem (Performed), and the book won Best Poetry at the Books Are My Bag Readers' Awards, run by the Booksellers Association.

In 2023 Pedersen was also announced as a two-year writer-in-residence at the University of Edinburgh.

In July 2024, Pedersen was announced as the new Edinburgh Makar, taking over the role from Hannah Lavery.

Pedersen released his debut novel, Muckle Flugga, in May 2025. It was shortlisted for Scotland's National Book Awards fiction book of the year.

== Personal life ==
Pedersen grew up in Portobello, Edinburgh and has an older sister. His partner is poet Hollie McNish.

== Publications ==
- Play with Me (poetry, 2013, Polygon)
- Oyster (poetry, 2017, Polygon, with Scott Hutchison)
- Boy Friends (prose, 2022, Faber)
- The Cat Prince & Other Poems (poetry, 2023, Corsair)
- Muckle Flugga (novel, 2025, Faber)
