= Mary Ellis (disambiguation) =

Mary Ellis (1897–2003) was an American actress and singer.

Mary Ellis may also refer to:

- Mary Ellis (Civil War nurse), Union nurse during the American Civil War
- Mary Ellis (pilot) (1917–2018), British World War II pilot
- Mary Baxter Ellis (1892–1968), British commanding officer of the First Aid Nursing Yeomanry
- Mary Beth Ellis (born 1977), American long-distance triathlete
- Mary Elizabeth Ellis (born 1979), American actress
- Mary Elizabeth Ellis (activist) (1881–1974), Welsh peace activist
- Mary Gordon Ellis (1889–1934), South Carolina state senator
- Mary H. Ellis (fl. from 2005), American sound designer
- Mary McKinley Daves Ellis (1835–1916), American political hostess
- Mary Paulson-Ellis (born 1968), Scottish writer and novelist
- Mary-Ellis Bunim (1946–2004), American television producer
- Mary Ellis Peltz (1896–1981), American drama and music critic
- Mary Ellis grave, of Mary Ellis (1750–1828), spinster of New Brunswick, New Jersey, U.S.
