= Alex T. Smith =

English author

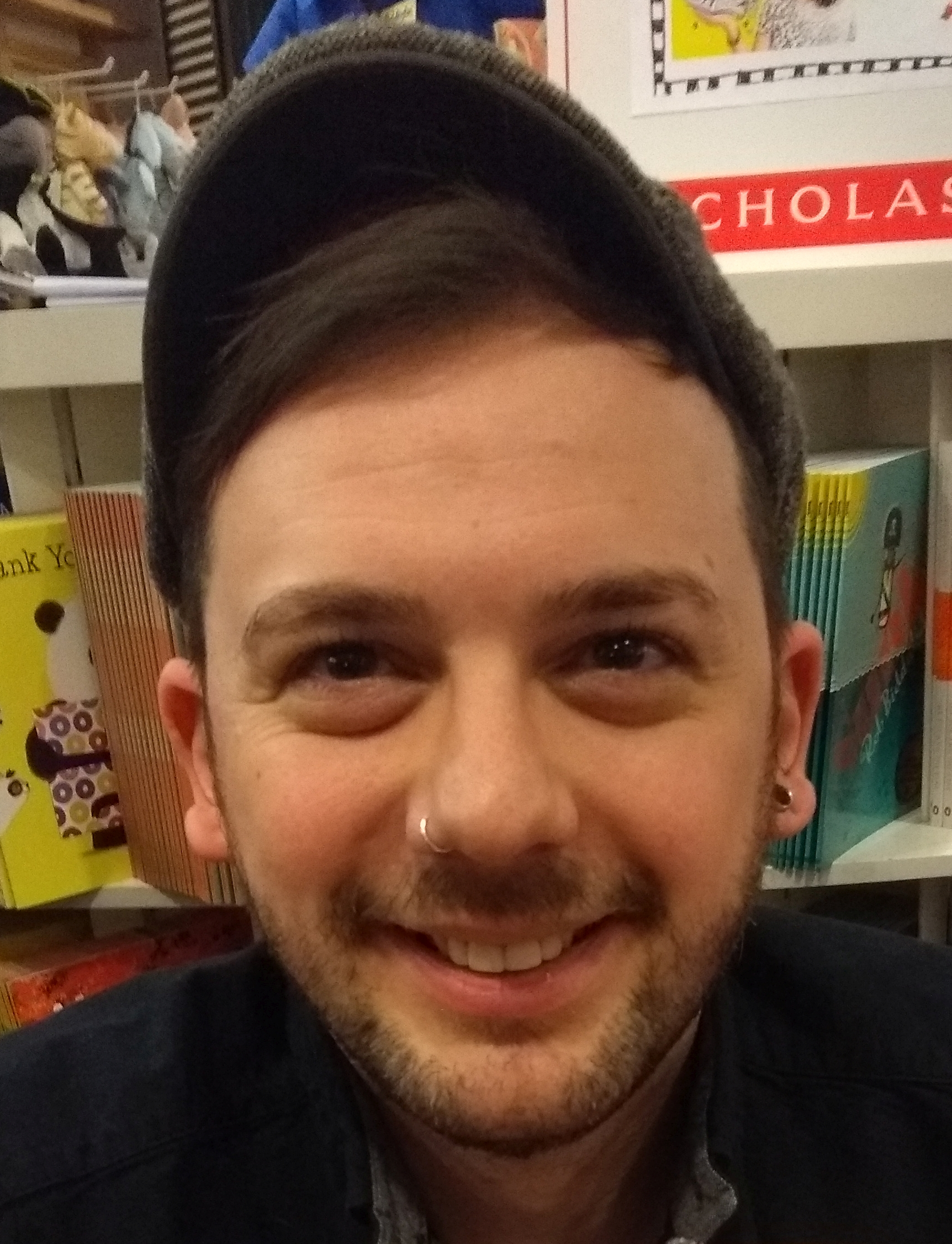
- Alex T. Smith in 2017
- Born: 2 August 1985 (age 41); Coventry, Warwickshire, England
- Education: Coventry University
- Occupations: Author, Illustrator
- Website: www.alextsmith.com

Alex T. Smith (born 2 August 1985) is a British author and illustrator of children's books, including Primrose, Egg, Ella, and the Claude book series. He was the illustrator for World Book Day 2014 in September 2013. His books have been published in several languages including Welsh, French, German, Swedish, Italian, Hungarian and Chinese.

== Education ==
He graduated in 2006 from Coventry University with a degree in illustration.

== Claude series ==
Claude is a dog. Claude is a small dog. Claude is a small, plump dog. Claude is a small, plump dog who wears a beret and a lovely jumper...

— Alex T. Smith

The adventures of Claude were published in a series of 10 books from 2011 to 2016. Recurring characters include Sir Bobblysock who accompanies Claude, and Mr & Mrs Shinyshoes, Claude's owners.

Claude was chosen as one of Clara Vulliamy's five favorite fictional characters and appears on gift cards produced by National Book Tokens.

In October 2013, it was announced that Claude had been optioned by Sixteen South for television aimed at boys and girls aged 4–6, and premiered on Disney Junior in June 2018.

== Bibliography ==
- Eliot Jones, Midnight Superhero (2009) - illustrator; text by Anne Cottringer
- Home (2010)
- My Mum has X-Ray Vision (2010) - illustrator; text by Angela McAllister
- Bella and Monty: A Hairy, Scary Night (2010)
- Egg (2011)
- Fantastic Frankie and the Brain-drain Machine (2011) - illustrator; text by Anna Kemp
- Ella (2012)
- Eliot, Midnight Superhero (2012 revised edition) - illustrator; text by Anne Cottringer
- Happy Birthday, Bunny! (2012) - illustrator; text by Anna Schaub
- Primrose (2013)
- Catch Us If You Can-Can (2013)
- Hector and the BIG BAD KNIGHT (2014)
- Little Red and the Very Hungry Lion (2015)
- Grave Matter (2017) - illustrator; text by Juno Dawson
- How Winston Delivered Christmas: A Christmas Story in Twenty-Four-and-a-Half Chapters (2019)
- The Twelve Days of Christmas: Grandma is Overly Generous (2020)
- The Grumpus (2022)
- The Nutcracker: And the Mouse King's Christmas Shenanigans (2023)
- How Winston Came Home for Christmas (2024)
- Murder! By Narwhal! (2024)

Tom & Matt Series

- The Baddie (2010) - illustrator; text by Anna Maxted
- The Horrible Princess (2010) - illustrator; text by Anna Maxted

Claude Series

- Claude in the City (2011)
- Claude on Holiday (2011) (republished as 'Claude at the Beach')
- Claude at the Circus (2012)
- Claude in the Country (2012)
- Claude in the Spotlight (2013)
- Claude on the Slopes (2013)
- Claude at Sea (2016) (picture book)
- Claude: Lights! Camera! Action! (2016)
- Claude Going for Gold (2016)
- Santa Claude (2016)
- Claude at the Palace (2020)

Mr Penguin Series

- Mr Penguin and the Lost Treasure (2017)
- Mr Penguin and the Fortress of Secrets (2018)
- Mr Penguin and the Catastrophic Cruise (2019)
- Mr Penguin and the Tomb of Doom (2021)

Astrid and the Space Cadets Series

- Astrid and the Space Cadets: Attack of the Snailiens! (2024)
- Astrid and the Space Cadets: Race from Planet Peril! (2024)
- Astrid and the Space Cadets: Danger at the Black Lagoon! (2025)
- Astrid and the Space Cadets: Calamity on Planet Shivers! (2025)

== Critical reception of books ==
- Catch Us If You Can-Can has been called "hilarious" by The Guardian.
- Claude in the Spotlight is thought of as "a very funny book, with lots of great pictures" by The Guardian and Booktrust described it as "An utterly charming book for emerging readers." Metro appreciated the "quirky illustrations and plenty of humour."
- Claude in the City reminded Martin Chilton writing in The Telegraph of "the fine stories of Allan Ahlberg." TheBookBag "loved everything about this book" and especially enjoyed the sense of fun, and how rich the text and pictures were for younger readers.". Claude in the City was described by the kidlit blog, There's a Book, as the "perfect transition from picture books to chapter books."

== Awards and recognitions ==
- 2006 Second prize in the Macmillan Prize for Children's Picture Book Illustration.
- 2009 Longlisted for the Kate Greenaway Medal.
- 2011 Stockport School's Book Award for My mum has X-ray Vision by Alex T. Smith and Angela McAllister.
- 2011 Dundee Picture Book Award for Bella & Monty.
- 2013 Longlisted for the Kate Greenaway Medal for Claude at the Circus.
- 2014 Longlisted for the Kate Greenaway Medal for Claude in the Spotlight.
- 2016 Longlisted for the Kate Greenaway Medal for The Hundred and One Dalmatians.
