= Donna Ashworth =

Scottish poet

- Born: United Kingdom
- Occupations: Poet, writer
- Writing career
- Language: English
- Genre: Poetry
- Website: donnaashworth.com

Donna Ashworth is a Sunday Times best-selling Scottish poet. She came to prominence in 2020 when her poetry about the UK's COVID-19 lockdown was read in a viral video to raise money for the NHS. She has subsequently been credited with helping poetry sales reach record levels in the UK, with UK print sales of Ashworth's books nearing half a million as of 2026.

== Career ==
During the UK's first COVID-19 lockdown in 2020, Ashworth started sharing her poetry on a feminist blog she had run since 2017. Before then, she had primarily shared only others' inspirational quotes. Her poem about this period, "History Will Remember When the World Stopped", became popular online, including being read by celebrities in a video to raise money for the NHS. This prompted her to self-publish a pamphlet of lockdown poems on Amazon.

Her second self-published volume, To the Women, sold 100,000 copies, leading her to sign with Bonnier in 2021. A revised edition of To the Women, containing 70 new poems, was published in 2025 by Scottish independent publishing house Black & White. It was shortlisted for the 2025 Books Are My Bag Readers' Awards.

Black & White acquired the rights to Ashworth's Wild Hope, which was published in September 2023. She finished the year with three titles in the top five of the poetry book chart and a further two in the top twenty, with total hardback sales around 70,000 books.

In March 2024, Ashworth signed a deal to publish a further five books with Black & White. As of March 2024, Ashworth's Wild Hope had been in The Sunday Times' best-seller chart for eleven weeks and was credited with being partially responsible for 2023 being the best year for British poetry sales since records began.

According to The Bookseller, Ashworth's total sales in 2024 were "just under" £827,000. This made her, for the third year in a row, the UK's bestselling living poet. Wild Hope and Ashworth's 2024 title Growing Brave were the two bestselling titles by volume in the Nielsen BookScan Poetry Texts & Poetry Anthologies category for the year.

The Times reported Ashworth's total print sales in the UK to be "nearly half a million" in April 2026. She also has a line of charity merchandise including mugs, beanies and tote bags.

== Style ==
Ashworth has been described as an Instagram poet, with The Observer calling her "a cheerleader of Instapoetry". The Telegraph said the uplifting themes of her poetry "work like motivational Post-It notes". Ashworth herself has described her work as "self help in poetry" and agrees that "a lot of what I say is cheesy", while fans have said her writing is "like a warm hug". The Economist described her work as feeling "like ChatGPT has been asked to produce inspirational fridge magnets".

Susie Goldsbrough, writing for The Times, described Ashworth, along with Len Pennie and Harry Baker, as being "Pot Noodle poetry": providing instant comfort and design to be consumed in "digestible spoonfuls" on Instagram.

== Personal life ==
Ashworth was born in a small village near Stirling, Scotland. She attended Glasgow University, studying film, theatre studies and Italian. She left university due to anxiety, partly attributed to the death by suicide of a fellow student and the recent murder of James Bulger. "I often respond to [other people’s tragedies] by catastrophising them. So I left all my stuff in the middle of the night and went back home to my mum". She had previously struggled with anorexia in her teens.

She attempted to enter the music industry, singing on cruise ships and moving to Manchester for a management contract. When she did not secure a record contract, she transitioned to magazine journalism.

She is married to Robert Ashworth, former producer of soap opera Coronation Street, with whom she has two sons, Felix and Brodie. She is based in Stirling.
