= A History of Women in 101 Objects =

- Author: Annabelle Hirsch
- Original title: Eine Geschichte der Frauen in 101 Objekten
- Translator: Eleanor Updegraff
- Language: German
- Genre: Non-fiction
- Published: 2022 (Kein & Aber) (German); 2023 Canongate Books (English)
- Publisher: Kein & Aber, Canongate Books, Crown Publishing Group
- Publication date: 13 September 2022
- English publication date: 12 October 2023
- ISBN: 978-3-0369-5880-4

A History of Women in 101 Objects is a non-fiction essay collection by Annabelle Hirsch that describes the "too-often-overlooked, manifold histories of women" in the western world through 101 objects.

Inspired by A History of the World in 100 Objects, the book spends three pages describing each object and its connection to a particular woman or to women's history. Hirsch analyzes the object from a modern lens, sometimes connecting it to other objects within the book.

The book begins with a healed femur from 30,000 BC and ends with a bunch of hair from 2022. Each object has a picture in a pink hue accompanying the written section.

Originally published as Eine Geschichte der Frauen in 101 Objekten, the book first released in September 2022. A History of Women in 101 Objects was translated into English from Hirsch's native German by Eleanor Updegraff. It was first published in English in October 2023.

The audiobook was read by Miriam Margolyes, Margaret Atwood, Cynthia Erivo, Helena Bonham Carter, Katy Hessel, Anita Rani, Jackie Kay, Len Pennie, Olivia Colman, Kate Winslet, Siri Hustvedt, Leïla Slimani, Julia Gillard, Nicola Sturgeon, Gillian Anderson, Val McDermid, Shirley Manson, Rebecca Solnit, Sandi Toksvig, Marina Hyde, and 81 more. The audiobook was released to raise money for Refuge, a domestic violence charity.

== Reception ==
A History of Women in 101 Objects was named one of Waterstones Best Books of 2023. The book was also The Guardian's Audiobook of the week for 15 Mar 2024.

Kirkus Reviews wrote that, "Filled with illuminating anecdotes, the collection is as entertaining as it is informative." Dua Lipa wrote for Service95 that "Hirsch tells the story of the women behind everyday items, how women's image has evolved throughout history and the role women have played in society. Hirsch perfectly balances humour and an engaging style to provide a voice to the voiceless."

According to the Goethe-Institut, "Regardless of whether she is presenting a seventh-century BCE Sappho papyrus or an 1889 bicycle, Hirsch creates empathetic proximity with the women of the past in her book."
