= Xigxag =

British audiobook company

xigxag
- Type: Private
- Industry: Audiobooks
- Founded: 2019; 7 years ago
- Founders: Kelli Fairbrother; Mark Chaplin
- Headquarters: Bodmin, Cornwall, UK
- Website: xigxag.co.uk

xigxag is a British audiobook retailer based in Bodmin. In contrast to many companies in its sector, it offers a no-subscription business model and a proprietary accessibility feature, the x-book, which allows listeners to refer to the text of the book while listening. It was rated as a best buy for audiobooks by Ethical Consumer.

== History ==
xigxag was founded by Kelli Fairbrother and Mark Chaplin in 2019. The company closed a £500,000 investment round in early 2022. In 2022, xigxag achieved B Corp status, and in 2024 it became the first audiobook retailer to accept National Book Tokens.
