= Lucy Rose (writer) =

English writer and filmmaker

- Born: Lucy Rose Wilson-Green; Leeds, England
- Education: Northumbria University
- Years active: 2017–present
- Website: lucyrosecreative.co.uk

Lucy Rose is an English writer and filmmaker. She began her career making short films. Her debut novel The Lamb (2025) became a Sunday Times bestseller.

== Early life and education ==
Rose was born in Leeds to a Yorkshire family and grew up in rural Cumbria. She left home at age 15 and graduated from Northumbria University with a Bachelor of Arts in Film and Television Production.

== Career ==
=== Film ===
Initially credited as Lucy Rose Wilson-Green, she wrote and directed the short film The Sycamore Gap during her final year of university as her graduating project. For The Sycamore Gap, she won the Student Award for Writing at the 2019 Royal Television Society's North East and Border Awards and was shortlisted for Film Hub North's inaugural Filmmaker Award.

This was followed by Rose's short films Peak, She Lives Alone, and Taste. She also founded the production company Cool Girl Pictures.

In 2024, Rose's debut feature film A Man at the Window was selected for the UK Next Wave Genre Lab, with Patrik Andersson and Jenna Bass as mentors.

=== Writing ===
Rose's work has been published in Mslexia and Dread Central. She founded the Working Class Writing Circle with Louis Glazzard.

In a six-way auction in June 2023, Weidenfeld & Nicolson won the rights to publish Rose's debut novel The Lamb in 2025. She began writing it as a series of flash fictions before reworking them into all being about one family. Centering around cannibalism, the novel has been identified as part of a trend of "femgore" literature and "feminist body horror." The Lamb debuted at #2 on The Sunday Times Best Seller list and was shortlisted for the 2025 Books Are My Bag Readers' Award for Fiction.

== Personal life ==
Rose lives in South Shields. She identifies as asexual.

== Works ==
=== Novels ===
- The Lamb. W&N. 2025. ISBN 9781399619714.

=== Selected short stories and essays ===
- "Fleeting Tale of Demeter" in The Selkie (2020)
- "Damn Spot" in Analogies & Allegories Literary Magazine, Issue 2: Twisted Tales (2020)
- "The Lady Crow" in The One That Got Away: Women of Horror, Volume 3 (2021), edited by Jill Girardi
- "Carcinization" in Of the Flesh (2024)

== Filmography ==
=== Short films ===
- The Sycamore Gap (2018)
- Peak (2019)
- She Lives Alone (2020)
- Taste (2023)
