= Neu!Reekie! =

Scottish arts and literature company

Neu! Reekie! was an Edinburgh-based literary company and arts production house founded in 2010 by poets Michael Pedersen and Kevin Williamson. They produced over 200 live shows and published poetry anthologies including #UntitledOne (2015), #UntitledTwo (2016) and #UntitledThree (2020).

Previous guests to Neu! Reekie! have included Irvine Welsh, Jackie Kay, Young Fathers, Margaret Atwood, Charlotte Church, Hollie McNish, Scott Hutchison, Tom Leonard, Liz Lochhead, Alasdair Gray, Linton Kwesi Johnson, Akala, Sabrina Mahfouz, Bill Drummond, Andrew Weatherall and Hannah Lavery.

In 2015, Neu! Reekie! were awarded Creative Edinburgh's City Award for outstanding contributions to Edinburgh's cultural scene.

In 2017, Neu! Reekie! hosted a large scale arts festival for Hull City of Culture 2017 entitled Where Are We Now? — a tribute to David Bowie's song of the same name.

In 2018, Neu! Reekie! curated a year-long programme of writing residencies at The Curfew Tower in Cushendall Northern Ireland — this was by invitation and at the request of Bill Drummond. Together, in 2019, Neu! Reekie! and Bill Drummond released a book of the writings on Bill Drummond's Penkiln Burn Press entitled After Curfew.

In 2020, the company released their third poetry anthology #UntitledThree with Polygon Books. This received positive reviews with The Scotsman noting: "As its urgent, pithy name attests, Neu! Reekie! is Edinburgh-based but with eagle eyes on the world, welcoming artists from home and away to be part of its gatherings and its output, retaining a gonzo spontaneity while comfortably curating events for prestigious global festivals".

Neu! Reekie! have hosted international shows in Japan, Indonesia, Spain, New Zealand and the United States.

In 2022, the collective - Pedersen and Williamson alongside photographer and artist Kat Gollock and musician Davie Miller - announced they were going on indefinite hiatus, with its final production event taking place in August of that year.
