= Louie Stowell =

English author

- Born: 1978 (age 47–48); London, England
- Education: Exeter College, Oxford
- Occupation: Author
- Writing career
- Notable work: Loki: A Bad God's Guide to Being Good
- Notable awards: Books Are My Bag Readers Awards; British Book Awards: Best Children's Book; Information Book Award
- Website: louiestowell.com

Louie Stowell is a British author, best known for her comic series of illustrated children's books about the Norse god Loki.

== Career ==
Stowell was born in 1978 in London, where she cites among her early reading influences The Lord of the Rings, Just William and Halo Jones. She went on to study English at Exeter College, Oxford. She later worked as a cartoonist, copywriter, PR and publisher at Usborne Publishing, then at Ladybird/Penguin Random House, before becoming a full-time novelist.

In 2009, Stowell published a non-fiction book for children, The Story of Astronomy and Space, illustrated by Peter Allen, described in The Guardian as "an excellent, if simplistic introduction to the wonders of the Universe." This was followed by a number of juvenile fiction and non-fiction books, including Look Inside:Your Body, Staying Safe Online and The Usborne Creative Writing Book. In 2016, she published The Usborne Official Astronaut's Handbook, illustrated by Roger Simo, which was shortlisted for the Royal Society's Young People's Book Prize, and in 2019, Politics For Beginners, which was shortlisted for the Children's Illustrated Non-Fiction Book of the Year at the British Book Awards in 2019.

In 2019, she published the first volume of the Dragon in the Library trilogy, illustrated by Davide Orfu, then a standalone middle-grade novel, Otherland, and the first volume of the ongoing middle-grade Loki: A Bad God's Guide... series, illustrated by Stowell herself, which re-imagines Loki in the body of an 11-year-old boy, and which was praised in The Guardian as "an irreverent romp through practical moral philosophy, like Netflix's The Good Place with more snarky cartoon snakes." A Bad God's Guide to Being Good was named Waterstones Children's Book of the Month for February 2022, and went on to win Best Overall Children's Book at the British Book Awards in 2023, as well as winning the Books for Younger Readers category. In 2023, Stowell's book for under-7-year-olds, ABC Pride, co-written with Dr Elly Barnes and illustrated by Amy Phelps, won the SLA Information Book Award.

In 2024, Stowell contributed a book of short stories to World Book Day.

Stowell is married, and lives with her wife in London.

== Awards ==
- A Bad God's Guide to Being Good: Winner of Books Are My Bag Readers Awards, 2022. Winner of: British Book Award: Best Children's Book, 2023. Winner of British Book Awards, Books For Younger Readers Category.
- A Bad God's Guide to Taking the Blame: Winner of Children's Favorites Award, 2024.
- ABC Pride: Winner of 2023 SLA Information Book Award.

== Bibliography ==
=== Juvenile fiction and non-fiction ===
- The Very First Christmas. UK: Usborne. 2006. p. 14. ISBN 1409525244.
- Brer Rabbit and the Blackberry Bush. UK: Usborne. 2008. p. 32. ISBN 978-1474900454.
- Stowell, Louie (2009). The Story of Astronomy and Space. UK. p. 104. ISBN 978-0746090060.
- Stories of Vampires. UK: Usborne. 2010. p. 62. ISBN 978-1409509967.
- Look Inside: Your Body. UK: Usborne. 2011. p. 14. ISBN 9781409549475.
- Write Your Own Story Book. UK: Usborne. 2011. ISBN 978-1805317555.
- The Odyssey. UK: Usborne. 2014. p. 64. ISBN 9781409585022.
- Staying Safe Online. UK: Usborne. 2016. p. 144. ISBN 978-1474925860.
- Politics For Beginners. UK: Usborne. 2021. p. 128. ISBN 978-1801313896.

=== The Dragon in the Library trilogy (illustrated by Davide Orfu) ===
- The Dragon in the Library. UK: Nosy Crow. 2019. p. 224. ISBN 9781788001090.
- The Monster in the Lake. UK: Nosy Crow. 2020. p. 224. ISBN 9781788001137.
- The Wizard in the Wood. UK: Nosy Crow. 2021. p. 224. ISBN 9781788006330.
- Otherland. UK: Nosy Crow. 2021. p. 224. ISBN 9781788000475.

=== Loki: A Bad God series ===
- Loki: A Bad God's Guide to Being Good. UK: Walker. 2022. p. 240. ISBN 9781536232448.
- Loki: A Bad God's Guide to Taking the Blame. UK: Walker. 2023. p. 288. ISBN 9781536226300.
- Loki: A Bad God's Guide to Ruling the World. UK: Walker. 2024. p. 288. ISBN 9781536226317.
- A Midsummer Night's Drama, illustrated by Isobel Lundie (2024, Little Tiger).
