= Joe Heap (author) =

English author

- Born: 1986 (age 39–40); London, England
- Education: University of Glasgow
- Occupation: Author
- Writing career
- Language: English
- Years active: 2004–present
- Notable works: The Rules of Seeing, When the Music Stops
- Notable awards: Foyle Young Poet Award (2004); Romantic Novelists' Association Award for Debut Romantic Novel (2018)

Joe Heap (born 1986) is an English author who resides in London. His poetry has been published in several journals and he was a winner of the 2004 Foyle Young Poet Award. He was a guest author at the 2018 Edinburgh International Book Festival.

== Life and works ==
Heap was born in London and grew up in Bradford, West Yorkshire. He later moved to Scotland where he completed a Masters in Creative Writing at the University of Glasgow.

After Heap's first book, The Rules of Seeing (HarperCollins, 2018), released, he was shortlisted for the Books Are My Bag Readers' Awards's Breakthrough Author; the book won the Romantic Novelists' Association Award for Debut Romantic Novel in 2018. His second novel was When the Music Stops (HarperCollins, 2020).

== Bibliography ==
=== Novels ===
- Heap, Joe (2018). The Rules of Seeing. London: HarperCollins. ISBN 9780008293192.
- Heap, Joe (2020). When the Music Stops. London: HarperCollins. ISBN 9780008293222.
- Heap, Joe (2025). Life Number Nine. London: Borough Press. ISBN 9780008475024.
- Heap, Joe (2025). A Murder of Rogues. London: Scholastic Corporation. ISBN 9780702342417.
