= Ruth Hogan =

British novelist

Ruth Marie Hogan (born 1961) is a British novelist. Her books are published by Two Roads, an imprint of Hachette.

== Life ==
Hogan was born in Bedford, and her mother worked in a bookshop. She studied English and drama at Goldsmiths College and worked in human resources in local government for 10 years before being injured in a car crash which left her unable to work full time. Cancer in 2012 led to her writing while sleepless through chemotherapy, and the result was her first published work, The Keeper of Lost Things.

== Writing ==
The reviewer in Kirkus Reviews described Hogan's first novel, The Keeper of Lost Things, as "whimsical" and said that "Readers looking for some undemanding, old-fashioned storytelling with a sprinkling of magic will find it here." The Guardian's reviewer described her second novel, The Wisdom of Sally Red Shoes as "warm and wise", saying that "Her passages on loss are vivid and visceral", and, writing of her third novel Queenie Malone's Paradise Hotel , said "Hogan has a reputation for eccentric characters, hints of the supernatural and the power of unexpected friendships. Here, she combines all these with a moving exploration of the complex relationship between mothers and daughters." Publishers Weekly's reviewer called her fourth novel "engrossing" and said it had "[the] trappings of a modern fairy tale".

Hogan's books have been published in many foreign translations such as Le gardien des choses perdus (French, title an exact translation of The Keeper of Lost Things) and Vielleicht Tanzen Wir Morgen (German, "Perhaps we will dance tomorrow", translation of The Wisdom of Sally Red Shoes).

Hogan has a publishing company named Tilbury Bean Books, named after her pet dog (also known as "Tilly"), which died before her first book was published.

== Awards and shortlisting ==
The Keeper of Lost Things was shortlisted in the "popular fiction" category for the 2017 Books Are My Bag Readers' Awards (won that year by Gail Honeyman's Eleanor Oliphant Is Completely Fine).

Queenie Malone's Paradise Hotel won the Fantasy Romantic Novel Award in the 2020 Romantic Novelists' Association Awards.

== Selected publications ==
- Hogan, Ruth (2017). The Keeper of Lost Things. London: Two Roads. ISBN 9781473635463.
- Hogan, Ruth (2018). The Wisdom of Sally Red Shoes. London: Two Roads. ISBN 9781473669017.
- Hogan, Ruth (2019). Queenie Malone's Paradise Hotel. London: Two Roads. ISBN 9781473669062.
- Hogan, Ruth (2021). Madame Burova. London: Two Roads. ISBN 9781529373349.

Published in United States as The Moon, the Stars, and Madame Burova ISBN 978-0063075436

- Hogan, Ruth (2025). The Light a Candle Society. London: Atlantic Books. ISBN 9781805460749.
