= Skin Books trilogy =

Novel series by Alice Broadway

The Skin Books Trilogy
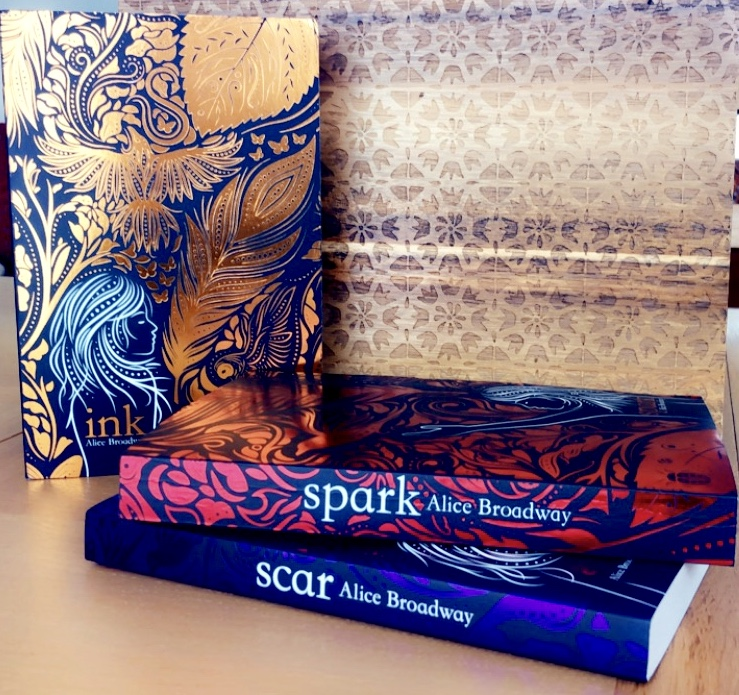
- The Skin Books Trilogy
- Ink (2017) Spark (2018) Scar (2019)
- Author: Alice Broadway
- Cover artist: Jamie Gregory (illustrator), Andrew Biscomb (designer)
- Country: United Kingdom
- Language: English
- Genre: Fantasy; Young adult fiction Dystopian fiction
- Publisher: Scholastic UK
- Published: 2017 – 2019
- Media type: Print (hardback and paperback), audiobook, e-book
- No. of books: 3 novels

The Skin Books (or INK) trilogy is a series of young adult fantasy/dystopian novels written by Alice Broadway. Ink, the first book in the trilogy, was her debut novel. The publication rights were acquired by Scholastic UK for a three-book deal in early 2016.
The books follow main protagonist, Leora Flint, who lives in a society where every significant moment, good or bad, is tattooed onto your skin and then preserved in a 'skin book' once you die. However, the blank community do not follow this practice, leaving their skin free of ink, which has caused a divide between the people of Saintstone and the blanks of Featherstone, and has resulted in a continued feud. When Leora uncovers secrets about her father, the blanks, and her true origin, the uneasy truce between the two societies is broken as the truths from both sides are unveiled. Leora and her allies wish for peace between Saintstone and Featherstone, while others within both communities wish for war and the destruction of the other.
Broadway began writing the book in order to process her "crisis of faith" after leaving the evangelical community she and her family had been a part of due to feeling bullied and manipulated. She shares her sense of loss and idea of no longer belonging within a community after a lifetime of living by their rules with her main protagonist, Leora.

== Publication history ==
The first book in the trilogy, Ink, was published in the UK in paperback and ebook on February 2, 2017 and published in the US in hardcover on January 2, 2018. The sequel Spark was published on April 5, 2018, in the UK and is due to published in July 2019 in the US. The final book in the trilogy, Scar, was published on April 4, 2019, in the UK and currently has no estimated release date in the US.

== Synopsis ==
=== Ink ===
In the first installment of the series, main protagonist Leora Flint lives in the town of Saintstone, where the residents mark their skin with important life events through the medium of tattoos. When a person dies, their skin is flayed and then, should the deceased be found worthy, preserved in a 'skin book' for remembrance. A tradition which has been passed down through generations, the marked community are taught that the purpose of inking their skin is to unburden their lives of secrets and deception, and after death they are flayed so they may live freely in the afterlife.
Leora aspires to become an 'inker'; a professional tattoo artist. When Leora's father dies, she finds comfort thinking that his skin book will be kept and remembered, believing he had led a good life. But when she discovers that his book has been tampered with and a mark removed, she begins to question his legacy and seeks to learn the truth. With the help of her friends, Verity and Oscar, and her mentor Obel, Leora sets out to solve the mystery behind her father's edited skin book and clear his name. However, her investigations uncovers connections between her father, her own past, and the 'blanks'.
The blanks live beyond the borders of Saintstone – those who do not ink their skin and were banished from Saintstone's marked society. Their differences and 'otherness' have led to the belief that they are secretive and dangerous; a belief that has been encouraged by their government to inspire fear and disdain towards those who do not adhere to the marked way of life. Leora learns that the government are keeping her father's book, and with her friend's help she steals the page displaying the mark of the crow; a sign that indicating that a person should be Forgotten.
However, Leora is betrayed and at the ceremonial weighing of her father's book she is told of her heritage; her father was disgraced and was inked with the crow for his connection with the blanks, and her mother was a blank woman. This shocks Leora so much she condemns her father's book to be burned, but later regrets her rash decision, and by Obel's hand she has herself marked with a crow.

=== Spark ===
After her defiance against the teachings of Saintstone and its government, Leora is presented with an opportunity only possible because of her mixed heritage. The government want to use her to infiltrate Featherstone, home to the blanks, so that they can be forever rid of them. However, Leora wishes to learn more about herself and her parents, and now no longer welcome among her own people and the mayor, Longsight, threatening her loved ones should she not comply with his demands, she is sent to earn the trust of the blanks.
Her arrival at the blank settlement sparks a debate over her trustworthiness, and despite the promises she made to the mayor, she yearns for acceptance and the truth about her past. It is agreed that she may stay and, so long as she abides by their ways, and she stays with the Whitworth's — whom she learns are Obel's family — and befriends the daughter, Gull. As she spends time with the impoverished residents of Featherstone, she begins to see that they are not so different from the people back home; their stories are the same, but read from a different perspective. They hold the belief that sin can be washed away with a ceremonial baptism on the birthday of the younger inhabitants, and think that those who mark their skin are sinful. Distrust of one another's societies runs deep on both sides, with the blanks blaming the marked community for their misfortune. Leora learns how they were attacked and exiled, forced to live in poverty, and must send out parties in order to steal supplies from Saintstone in order to survive.
Leora sneaks out for the first meeting with the mayor's contact, who turns out to be Verity — her best friend who believes she was betrayed by Leora in the first book — but after they argue decides to end any further communications. However the information that she did pass on leads to an unsuccessful raid, and Featherstone is left without enough food or medical supplies, sparking rage against the Saintstone. After the party have returned, Leora is introduced to Sana, unofficial leader of Featherstone and her late mother's best friend; Sana tells her a little about her mother and the past of Featherstone.
Later, the arrival of her friend Oscar and his news of Obel's arrest trigger unrest, and Leora sets out to Saintstone with Sana and her crew to free Obel. However, when Leora returns she is intercepted by government official and Mayor Longsight's right-hand man, Jack Minnow, and escorted to the mayor. A town meeting is called in which Leora is to renounce the blanks, but before she takes the stage a hooded figure stabs Mayor Longsight, and in the confusion Leora escapes back to Featherstone.
Upon her return, Leora confesses he previous agreement with Longsight, and is shunned by the majority of the blank community. She attends Gull's birthday ceremony from the outskirts, uninvited, but when Gull does not return to the surface of the lake, Leora pulls her out of the water to safety. After Gull has recovered a little, they return to find the water supply has been poisoned, with the marked being labelled as the culprits. Later, Leora and her friends make their way to Featherstone's elderhouse on a hunch, and Leora discovers the bloody knife used to stab Longsight. Sana arrives and confesses to the act, as well as starving the people, poisoning the water and more, to provoke the people of Featherstone into action against Saintstone. This leads to Leora and Gull leaving for Saintstone, but upon their arrival, they find Mayor Longsight alive and they are captured.

=== Scar ===
In the final installment of the series, Leora finds herself prisoner of the corrupt mayor of Saintstone, and must convince both sides of her honesty and intentions to unite the two communities, whilst exposing the truth and also trying to protect her loved ones, even when she doesn't know where they are, or if they would count her as friend or foe. The mayor appears to have performed miracles — cheating death and tattoos disappearing from his skin — but she and her mentor, Mel, set out to find the truth behind these acts with help from the stories of both communities.
Leora, accompanied by Mel, travel to Featherstone in an attempt to broker peace between the two societies, but find that Sana has planned an attack on the marked. When they return to Saintstone the hall of remembrance — where the marked community go to speak the names of those who have died — is destroyed, and after Mel leaves for her home she is captured. Leora seeks out Jack Minnow for information and safety regarding her friends, but she is instead rejected by them. As she leaves, a crowd is forming in the square and the mayor brings Gull forward who has now been marked. The people of Saintstone do not perceive this as the act of unity it was intended to be, and Leora intercepts the mob and the guards to protect Gull.
Leora is imprisoned and then later brought in front of the people, where Mayor Longsight intends to flay her alive; he removes one piece of her skin before he is stopped. Minnow then claims on the part of the mayor, and takes control over Saintstone, while Leora heals at home.
After some time, a few members of Featherstone travel Leora's home for safety from Sana. After waking from a seemingly prophetic dream, Leora leaves her home for the museum — now filled with the communities skin books after the attack on the hall of remembrance — and finds a confrontation between Sana and Minnow. Sana hits Minnow with a lantern which in turn sets the museum on fire. Minnow attacks Leora and in the ensuing fight falls over a barrier and into the fire. Leora attempts to save the books and in her search for them finds Mel, who saves herself and Leora by jumping from a window.
At the end of the book Mel is in charge of Saintstone and Leora is beginning to heal from her burns, as is the relationship between the blank and marked communities.

== Themes ==
Religious Themes: One of the major themes of the books is the concept of faith and its effect on people's lives, after the author's own religious experiences. They also focus on the understanding of death and a sense of loss that changes between different beliefs, Broadway having taken inspiration from evangelical Christianity and ancient Egypt. The concepts of judgment, afterlife, and preservation are often presented with the marked's ceremonial weighing of the skin books and the blank's baptismal birthday ceremony.

Social Themes: Another main focus of the books is the fear of 'otherness' and the unknown; the people of Saintstone have been taught to fear the blanks since childhood, while Featherstone have been taught to hate marked people. However, as Leora spends time with both societies, she learns they share many similarities and that it is the stories and lies told on both sides that keep them divided. Within both communities, there are those who see the views of the other, and who strive for acceptance and peace between the two people.

Coming-of-age Themes: The book looks at two different issues within the coming-of-age bracket; challenging authority and self-expression. Throughout the series not everything is as it seems and characters must challenge their leaders, their teachings, and their own preconceptions to find the truth. There is also a focus on society's expectations on the looks and behaviour of the younger generation, from children to teens to young adults. This is most obviously demonstrated through the use of tattoos; Saintstone require all residents to mark their skin with important life events, while Featherstone was founded by those who refused to tattoo themselves and were banished.

Fairytales and myths: Throughout the books there are references to myths and fairytales, such as Sleeping Beauty and Rapunzel. In an interview Broadway mentions how these well-known tales can be used and interpreted in different ways depending on the teller or the receiver, and she uses this idea of multiple interpretation — the different societies' stories steming from the same place, the sisters Moriah and Belia, but manipulated to illustrate the ideals of those who are in charge — to demonstrate the similarities between the two communities.

== Characters ==
- Leora Flint: The main protagonist of the trilogy. Though raised in Saintstone amongst the marked community, she is the child of Miranda Flint, a blank woman, and Joel Flint originally Joe Elliot, a marked man. Raised by Sophie Flint. When she discovers that she was born already marked despite her blank heritage, she embarks on a journey that many consider to be her destiny; to bring the blanks and the marked together again.
- Joel Flint: Leora's father, whose death acts as a catalyst for the events in the trilogy. Originally a resident of another local inked community, Riverton, he was sympathetic to the blanks and their suffering. After saving the life of a blank man, he was shunned by Riverton but welcomed into the Featherstone community where he met and fell in love with Miranda, Leora's birth mother. Upon Leora's birth, Joel entered Saintstone in order to protect and raise Leora in safety.
- Verity Kohl: Leora's childhood best friend from Saintstone. Verity helps Leora in trying to clear her father's name as she works within the government, however she feels betrayed by Leora's growing sympathy and friendship with the blanks.
- Oscar Drew: Leora's friend and love interest. After his father is publicly marked with the crow — a symbol to show that his skin book will be burned and he will be forgotten — he befriends Leora and encourages her relationship with the blank community-leading the two to become close.
- Gull Whitworth: A new friend that Leora makes from the blank community of Featherstone. Gull is the younger sister of Obel, and struggles to fit in within blank society. She is intrigued by Leora's stories of Saintstone and the marked community.
- Obel Whitworth: A local inker who acts as Leora's employer and teacher. Though he lives within Saintstone and is praised and revered for his artistic inking talents, he is secretly an exile from Featherstone.
- Mel: The official story-teller of Saintstone and mentor to Leora. Chosen at childhood to carry the stories of Saintstone whilst forbidden to have a family of her own. Leora's conflicting feelings about the two communities and their histories challenge all that Mel has been brought up and taught to believe, and she begins to see the truth and the lies in both side's stories.
- Mayor Longsight: The Mayor of Saintstone. Longsight preaches that the blanks intend to wage war upon Saintstone due their opposing beliefs, and that the only way to stop the coming war is to defeat the blanks first.
- Jack Minnow: Righthand-man to Mayor Longsight. While he leads the investigation against Leora and blank sympathisers in book one, Leora tattoos Minnow and, in inking and reading his other marks, discovers his taste for violence.

== Reception ==
Initial response to the series was generally positive, with the first book in the series, Ink, being shortlisted for several awards, including the Waterstones Children's Book Prize 2018, the Books Are My Bag Award, the Leeds Book Awards, the Trinity Schools Book Award, and within the top ten shortlist for the 2018 Federation of Children's Book Groups Children's Book Award. It was also longlisted for the 2018 CILIP Carnegie Medal, and within top twenty longlist for 2018 Branford Boase Award. It also achieved best-seller status for a debut novel in 2017.

=== Reviews ===
Elizabeth Finlayson with The School Librarian praises the author's use of "formal, reflective language" and the "moving" tone when addressing sensitive topics, though they also comments that it is a "longish read", with a suggested age range of between 16 and 19. Publishers Weekly comments on how the story explores loss and grief, and how Broadway shows power becoming "manipulative, controlling, and deceptive", although they express confusion about why the tattooing and flaying are they only way to remember someone. Their suggested reading age is 14+. An interview with The Guardian suggests some divided opinion over the books' use of flaying; the action making some readers "squeamish" and consider it to be too much for a YA novel, while others commend the edgy ideas and inclusion of tattoos. Kirkus Reviews praises Ink for introducing an intriguing and original dystopian premise, and "dramatic climax", though criticizes the ambiguous definitions regarding the two communities, and Leora's "vacillating" narrative voice. Their review of Spark again comments on the tone of narration and "inconsistent worldbuilding", but approves of the authors prosaic language for the in-world stories, "taut and suspenseful" pace, and again a dramatic ending.

=== Sales ===
Sales figures according to Nielsen BookScan indicate UK sales of over 29,000 between February 2017 and August 2018. Sales for the second and third books in the series are lower, Spark reaching 6,875 sales between April 2018 – 2019, and Scar totalling 1,722 between its publication date in April and May 2019.

== Translations and International Release ==
In advance of Ink's UK publication, Scholastic sold the rights to the first book in the series in Australia, France, Italy, Latin America, The Netherlands, Romania, Russia, Spain, Turkey, and the US. Further translations have been made since, with more alternative book covers being produced for Lithuania, Slovakia, Czech Republic, and Mexico.
