= Alice Vincent =

English non-fiction writer (born 1988)

- Born: Alice Emily Vincent; September 1988 (age 37–38)
- Education: Newcastle University
- Occupation: Non-fiction writer
- Years active: 2010–present
- Children: 2
- Website: www.alicevincent.co.uk

Alice Emily Vincent (born September 1988) is an English horticultural and non-fiction writer, editor and podcaster. She began her career as an arts and music journalist before shifting to urban gardening. Her books include the guide How to Grow Stuff (2017), as well as Rootbound: Rewilding a Life (2020) and Why Women Grow: Stories of Soil, Sisterhood and Survival (2023).

== Early life ==
Vincent spent her early childhood in "Berkshire suburbia", before her family moved to rural Buckinghamshire, near Milton Keynes.

Vincent attended the Royal Latin School in Buckingham. She graduated with a degree in English literature from Newcastle University in 2010.

== Career ==
After graduating from university, Vincent interned at Nylon in New York, beginning her career in arts and music journalism. She subsequently worked as an editorial assistant for Wired and the Huffington Post and was a founding contributor to Wannabe Hacks. In 2013, she joined the arts desk of The Telegraph as an editor. Around 2014, she started an urban gardening newsletter and Instagram account under the name Noughticulture. Vincent published her debut book How to Grow Stuff in 2017. The book is a beginner guide to "growing things: herbs, vegetables, houseplants, flowers, and bulbs—and with these, hopefully, your confidence".

Vincent left The Telegraph to become a features editor at Penguin Books. She has columns in The Guardian, Gardens Illustrated and The New Statesman.

In 2019, Canongate Books acquired the rights to publish Vincent's "gardening memoir" Rootbound: Rewilding a Life in 2020. The book blends personal history as a young adult in the 21st-century with broader botanical history. Rootbound was longlisted for the Wainwright Prize. During the COVID-19 lockdown, Vincent released her second gardening guide Seeds from Scratch as an audiobook.

At the start of 2023, Vincent launched the podcast Why Women Grow; the debut episode featured Claire Ratinon. Later in the year came Vincent's next book Why Women Grow: Stories of Soil, Sisterhood and Survival, also published via Canongate, which collects from women gardeners of various ages and backgrounds. Why Women Grow was shortlisted for a Books Are My Bag Readers' Award in the Non-fiction category and an Indie Champion Award. It was also longlisted for the Wainwright Prize for Nature Writing.

In January 2024, Vincent started co-hosting the literary podcast In Haste with Charlotte Runcie.

Vincent reunited with Canongate for the publication of her next book Hark: How Women Listen.

== Personal life ==
Vincent lives in South London with her husband, whom she married in 2022, and their two children.

== Bibliography ==
- How to Grow Stuff (2017)
- Rootbound: Rewilding a Life (2020)
- Seeds from Scratch (2020), audiobook
- Why Women Grow: Stories of Soil, Sisterhood and Survival (2023)
- Hark: How Women Listen (2025)
