= Ian Leslie (writer) =

British writer

Ian Leslie is a British writer on human behaviour. He has written the books Born Liars (2011), Curious (2014), Conflicted (2021), and John & Paul: A Love Story in Songs (2024).

== Writing ==
Born Liars: Why We Can't Live Without Deceit is "about the useful role that deception plays in our lives". Much of Curious: the Desire to Know and Why Your Future Depends on It is "focused on how harnessing young people's innate curiosity about the world is key to their whole futures." In Conflicted: Why Arguments Are Tearing Us Apart and How They Can Bring Us Together he writes: "Open, passionate disagreement blows away the cobwebs that gather over even the most enduring relationships . . . It flushes out crucial information and insights that will otherwise lie inaccessible or dormant inside our brains. It fulfils the creative potential of diversity". The second half of the book is devoted to ten "rules of productive argument", which Leslie deduces from encounters with specialists in interrogation and hostage negotiation.

In 2021 it was announced that Faber & Faber had bought the rights to Leslie's Beatles book, John and Paul: a Love Story in Twenty-three Songs, an exploration of the relationship between the band's songwriting partnership of John Lennon and Paul McCartney. It was longlisted for the 2025 Baillie Gifford Prize and shortlisted for the 2025 Books Are My Bag Readers' Awards.

Leslie also writes about psychology, culture, technology and business for the New Statesman, The Economist, The Guardian and the Financial Times.

== Personal life ==
Leslie lives in London with his wife and two young children.

== Publications ==
- Born Liars: Why We Can't Live Without Deceit (Quercus, 2011)
- Curious: the Desire to Know and Why Your Future Depends on It (Quercus, 2014)
- Conflicted: Why Arguments Are Tearing Us Apart and How They Can Bring Us Together (Faber and Faber, 2021)
- John & Paul: A Love Story in Songs (Celadon, 2024)
