= The Flame (poetry collection) =

Leonard Cohen poetry collection

- Author: Leonard Cohen
- Cover artist: Rafaela Romaya (design) / Leonard Cohen (illustration)
- Language: English
- Publisher: Canongate Books Ltd
- Publication date: 2 October 2018
- Publication place: United Kingdom
- Media type: Print (hardback)
- Pages: 278

The Flame is a posthumous poetry collection by Canadian author and singer-songwriter Leonard Cohen, published in 2018. It was edited by Robert Faggen and Alexandra Pleshoyano, with a foreword by Cohen's son Adam Cohen.

== Contents ==
The Flame was published two years after Cohen's death at the age of 82. As Adam Cohen explains, his father was working on the collection during his final illness, the work being "what he was staying alive to do", but was unable to see it to completion. Adam, who provided the title, further states that flames are a recurrent image in his father's work: "There are fires and flames, for creation and destruction, for heat and light, for desire and consummation, throughout his work [...] He was stimulated by their danger—he often spoke of other people's art as not having enough "danger," and he praised the "excitement of a thought that was in flames.""

Editors Faggen and Pleshoyano, along with Cohen's long-time Canadian publishers, used the manuscript prepared by Cohen as a basis for presenting the book in a format that they believed reflected the author's intentions. There are three sections, the first consisting of sixty-three poems chosen by Cohen from work spanning decades, the second comprising the poems that became lyrics for his last four music albums, and the third being a selection of entries from Cohen's notebooks, "which he kept on a daily basis from his teenage years up until the last day of his life." Drawings by Cohen, often self-portraits, are reproduced throughout the book, which also includes his acceptance speech for the Prince of Asturias Award, which he received in 2011, and an email exchange with Peter Dale Scott that took place shortly before Cohen's death.

== Reception ==
Kirkus Reviews noted The Flame to be "emphatically for the Cohen completist", stating also that it "is abundantly clear in these pages" that Cohen often found the place "where the good songs came from". The New York Times reviewer was not a fan, calling the poems "monotonous scribbles of the moody-undergraduate school, what young Werther would have sung had he been Canadian", finding the self-portraits and drawings of women to represent "the internal proportions of Cohen's famous vanity and his equally famous lechery", and pronouncing Cohen a lyricist rather than a poet. The reviewer of The Age considered The Flame a collection apt for long-time fans, calling Cohen "always observant and amused, even when he is the butt of his own jokes" and finding "moments of brilliance and moments of beauty" in the book, with many poems and lyrics "that are comforting and familiar with their waltzy rhythms and mesmerising repetition."
