= Hollie McNish =

Hollie McNish FRSL
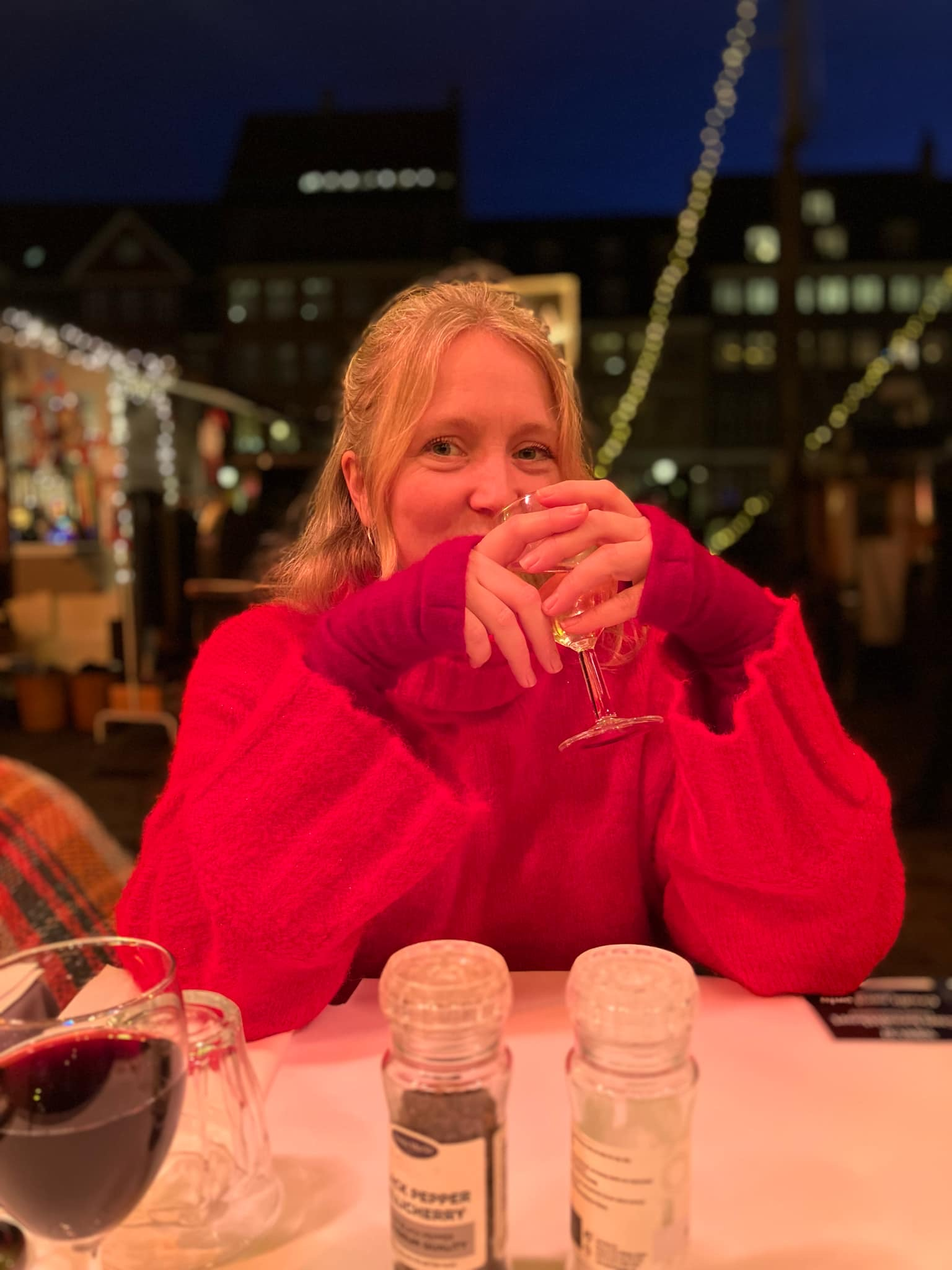
- McNish in 2025

Background information
- Also known as: Hollie Poetry
- Born: 1983 (age 42–43); Reading, Berkshire, England
- Education: King's College, Cambridge; School of Oriental and African Studies, University of London
- Genres: Poetry, memoir, spoken word, non-fiction
- Years active: 2009–present
- Label: None
- Website: holliepoetry.com

Hollie McNish (born 1983) is a British poet and author based between Cambridge and Glasgow. She has published four collections of poetry: Papers (2012), Cherry Pie (2015), Why I Ride (2015), Plum (2017) and one poetic memoir on politics and parenthood, Nobody Told Me (2016), for which she won the Ted Hughes Award for New Work in Poetry. The latter has been translated into German, French and Spanish. McNish's sixth publication – a second cross-genre collection of poetry, memoir and short stories – Slug, and other things I've been told to hate, was published in May 2021 with Hachette with a further collection Lobster, was published in 2024 In 2016, she co-wrote with fellow poet Sabrina Mahfouz a play titled Offside, relating the history of British women in football. This was published as a book in 2017.

McNish has also released an album of poetry and music, Versus (2014), which made her the first poet to record an album at Abbey Road Studios, London.

As well as her own publications, McNish has written and performed poems for various campaigns and organisations, including The Economist Education Foundation, Durex's campaign for orgasm equality, and The Eve Appeal. In terms of her social media presence, McNish has been described by the BBC as "one of the UK's most widely shared poets."

== Early life ==
Born in Reading in 1983 to Scottish parents, McNish attended Bucklebury Primary, with a brief two year scholarship to Prior's Court School for the final years of her primary education. Later, she attended St Bartholomew's Comprehensive School, Newbury, during which time she worked part-time at Little Chef at Chieveley Services and Boots in Newbury, both of which she has written about in her fourth collection, Plum. She studied Modern and Medieval Languages at King's College, Cambridge, with a third year abroad teaching English in Guadeloupe, French West Indies, where she learnt Guadeloupian Creole to English translation. She went on to take a part-time master's degree in international development and economics at the School of Oriental and African Studies, University of London.

McNish has stated that her favourite book growing up was 'Please Mrs. Butler' by Alan Ahlberg.

== Career ==
Before becoming a full-time writer in 2014, McNish worked in Boots, Soul Tree nightclub, Little Chef, Mayhem Clothing Store, and for five years as Administrative Assistant and later Education Officer with the East of England Urban Design Centre, Shape East.

Her first live poetry reading was at the basement open mic night Poetry Unplugged at Poetry Café in Covent Garden. She has since performed at UK and international events, alongside a variety of artists at Edinburgh's Neu!Reekie! events including Charlotte Church, Young Fathers, Jackie Kay, Kae Tempest and Roger McGough. She has toured with poets Vanessa Kisuule and Michael Pedersen.

In 2014, McNish adopted the pseudonym Hollie Poetry after online abuse led her to fear using her surname. She released one album under this pseudonym, Versus, in September 2014, which was recorded at Abbey Road Studios and making her the first poet to do so. A second album Poetry versus Orchestra (2016), featured McNish's poetry "in combination with music written by composer and conductor Jules Buckley and played by the Metropole Orkest." which was performed in a one of live concert at Cadogan Hall, London. In 2017, McNish returned to the use of her surname for all published works.

In 2016, BBC Radio 4 Woman's Hour broadcast a seven-part radio short documentary series hosted by McNish entitled Becoming a Mother: A Hot Cup of Tea with Hollie McNish which explored motherhood from many angles, including poverty, linguistic barriers, mothering as migrants and teenage parenting.

In 2018, she was artist in residence at Chester's Storyhouse. In 2019, McNish won the Farrago Poetry Slam Championship.

As well as live events, McNish is also an advocate for online poetry readings, and a number of McNish's YouTube videos have gone viral. By 2015, her YouTube account had had more than 4.1 million views. In 2020, during the Coronavirus lockdown, McNish began her regular online event, Poems in Pyjamas, streaming every Sunday night on her Instagram and Facebook channels.

She is a patron of Baby Milk Action, a network of over 270 citizens groups in more than 160 countries whose aim is "to stop misleading marketing by the baby feeding industry... protect breastfeeding and babies fed on formula to prevent unnecessary death and suffering".

McNish was elected a Fellow of the Royal Society of Literature (FRSL) in 2025.

== Critical response ==
McNish's work has divided critics, with Rebecca Watts of the P. N. Review going so far as to refuse to review her 2018 Picador publication Plum, because "to do so for a poetry journal would imply that it deserves to be taken seriously as poetry". Following an online response from McNish, this article received coverage in several national news outlets such as The Guardian and the BBC. In the same year, actress Emma Watson named McNish, alongside other poets Rupi Kaur and Sabrina Mahfouz, as having reignited her love for poetry. The Scotsman said of her work: "But even by the standards of the defiantly lawless world of performance poetry, McNish, the English-raised daughter of Scottish parents, must seem – to some, at least – like a bewildering law unto herself." and P. N. Review described it as "...abundant in expletives and unintimidating to anyone who considers ignorance a virtue."

== Publications ==
=== Poetry ===
- Papers. London: Greenwich Exchange, 2012. ISBN 978-1906075675.
- Cherry Pie. Burning Eye, 2015. ISBN 978-1909136557. Illustrated by various artists and illustrators.
- Why I Ride: Because a Bike Pedal Lasts Longer Than a Gas Tank. Brattleboro, VT: Green Writers Press, 2015. ISBN 978-0989310482.
- Nobody Told Me: Poetry and Parenthood. London: Blackfriars, 2016. ISBN 9780349134352.
- Plum. UK: Picador, 2017. ISBN 9781509815760.
- Slug... and other things I'm told to hate. London: Fleet Publishing, 2021. ISBN 9780349726359
- Lobster and other things I'm learning to love. London: Fleet Publishing, 2025. ISBN 9780349726656
- Virgin. London: Fleet publishing, 2025. ISBN 9780349127446

=== Play ===
- Offside. Bloomsbury Methuen Drama, 2017. With Sabrina Mahfouz. ISBN 978-1-3500-4077-9.

== Albums ==
- Push Kick: A Journey Through the Beauty, Brilliance and Bollocks of Having a Baby (2010)
- Touch (2010)
- Versus (2014, Yup! Records) – Double album as Hollie Poetry
- Poetry versus Orchestra (Mo Black, 2016) – with Jules Buckley and Metropole Orkest

== Awards ==
- 2009: Winner, UK Slam Poetry Competition and went on to finish third in the global Slam Du Monde contest.
- 2015: Winner, Fellowships 2015, The Arts Foundation
- 2016: Ted Hughes Award for New Work in Poetry, for Nobody Told Me
- 2019: K Blundell Trust Award from Royal Society of Authors
