= The Compound (Rawle novel) =

2025 novel by Aisling Rawle

- First edition cover art
- Author: Aisling Rawle
- Cover artist: Carrie Graber
- Language: English
- Genre: Dystopia, satire
- Publisher: The Borough Press
- Publication date: 3 July 2025
- Pages: 336
- ISBN: 978-0-00-871008-8

The Compound is a 2025 dystopian novel by Irish author Aisling Rawle. It was published by The Borough Press on 3 July 2025. It won a Goodreads Choice Award in the Readers' Favorite Science Fiction category. It is Rawle's debut novel.

== Background ==
Rawle was inspired by the gender politics of reality television shows that she had observed while binge-watching Love Island over the COVID-19 lockdowns. She has stated that her goal was to take some of the concepts presented in Love Island and tweak them so they felt more sinister than sexy. She was also inspired by The Lord of the Flies and Animal Farm.

== Synopsis ==
In a war-torn future, a young woman named Lily competes in a reality television series set in a windowless, doorless house on a desert oasis. While ten men and ten women were invited, only nine men arrive. This leaves the women at a disadvantage, as contestants must share a bed with a member of the opposite sex or face elimination in the morning. Contestants must also complete communal tasks such as voting other contestants out in order to earn supplies for the group, as well as complete personal tasks for individual luxury goods. They are forbidden from sharing information about their outside lives, and receive tasks from a communal screen, as the producers are faceless figures who only intervene when a life is at risk. As the competition progresses, contestants become obsessed with their tasks and the prizes they can win.

== Reception ==
The novel won a Goodreads Choice Award in the Readers' Favorite Science Fiction category. It was the Good Morning America Book Club pick for July 2025 and was featured on the BBC Radio 2 Book Club.

The novel received positive reviews, and was praised in particular for its pacing. Aoife Rooney praised its tension and commentary on reality television in her review for the Irish Independent. Publishers Weekly praised its depth and its protagonist's character development. MJ Franklin praised the novel's premise and its thoughtfulness in his review for the New York Times. Kirkus Reviews praised the novel's fully imagined world and shrewd indictment of reality television's contrived survivalism, but wrote that the novel "takes a while to gather steam". In her review for the Irish Times, Ruby Eastwood praised the novel's atmosphere and called it "one of the most engrossing and confidently executed novels [she] had read in a long time", while calling its political edge its least persuasive element.
