= Peter Lovatt =

Dance psychologist

Peter Lovatt (born 30 October 1964), better known as Doctor Dance, is a UK based author and a Dance psychologist.

== Early life and education ==
Lovatt overcame a significant reading disability to pursue degrees in Psychology & English, Neural Computation, and Experimental Cognitive Psychology after working as a professional dancer in musical theater. He has a PhD in Experimental Cognitive Psychology.

== Professional career ==
Lovatt founded the Dance Psychology Lab at the University of Hertfordshire in 2008.

Lovatt co-founded Movement in Practice, a methodology that enhances the human experience in social care, education, business, and health.

Peter has participated in keynote addresses with Lin-Manuel Miranda, Sir Richard Branson, Steve "The Woz" Wozniak, Geena Davis, Oprah Winfrey, and Barack Obama.

In 2022, Lovatt and Dame Darcey Bussell introduced the Move-Assure Dance for Mental Wellbeing program.

He is a former pro dancer and lecturer at The Royal Ballet Academy in London.

Lovatt is the Director of Dance Psychology at Movement in Practice.

== Published work ==
=== Books ===
- Lovatt, Peter (2020-04-02). The Dance Cure: The surprising secret to being smarter, stronger, happier. Octopus. ISBN 978-1-78072-412-6.
- Lovatt, Peter (2018-01-09). Dance Psychology. Lulu.com. ISBN 978-0-244-96056-8.

=== Articles ===
- Rose, Dawn; Müllensiefen, Daniel; Lovatt, Peter; Orgs, Guido (2022). "The Goldsmiths Dance Sophistication Index (Gold-DSI): A Psychometric Tool to Assess Individual Differences in Dance Experience". Psychology of Aesthetics, Creativity, and the Arts. 16 (4): 733–745. doi:10.1037/aca0000340.
- Rose, Dawn; Ott, Laurent; Guérin, Ségolène M. R.; Annett, Lucy E.; Lovatt, Peter; Delevoye-Turrell, Yvonne N. (2021-02-05). "A general procedure to measure the pacing of body movements timed to music and metronome in younger and older adults". Scientific Reports. 11 (1): 3264. Bibcode:2021NatSR..11.3264R. doi:10.1038/s41598-021-82283-4. ISSN 2045-2322. PMC 7864905. PMID 33547366.
- Rose, Dawn; Cameron, Daniel J.; Lovatt, Peter J.; Grahn, Jessica A.; Annett, Lucy E. (2020-01-31). "Comparison of Spontaneous Motor Tempo during Finger Tapping, Toe Tapping and Stepping on the Spot in People with and without Parkinson's Disease". Journal of Movement Disorders. 13 (1): 47–56. doi:10.14802/jmd.19043. ISSN 2005-940X. PMC 6987525. PMID 31986868.
- Rose, Dawn; Delevoye-Turrell, Yvonne; Ott, Laurent; Annett, Lucy E.; Lovatt, Peter J. (2019). "Music and Metronomes Differentially Impact Motor Timing in People with and without Parkinson's Disease: Effects of Slow, Medium, and Fast Tempi on Entrainment and Synchronization Performances in Finger Tapping, Toe Tapping, and Stepping on the Spot Tasks". Parkinson's Disease. 2019 6530838. doi:10.1155/2019/6530838. ISSN 2090-8083. PMC 6721399. PMID 31531220.
- Lewis, Carine; Annett, Lucy E.; Davenport, Sally; Hall, Amelia A.; Lovatt, Peter (2016). "Mood changes following social dance sessions in people with Parkinson's disease". Journal of Health Psychology. 21 (4): 483–492. doi:10.1177/1359105314529681. hdl:2299/17641. ISSN 1461-7277. PMID 24752558.
- Lewis, Carine; Lovatt, Peter; Kirk, Elizabeth (September 2015). "Many hands make light work: The facilitative role of gesture in verbal improvisation". Thinking Skills and Creativity. 17: 149–157. doi:10.1016/j.tsc.2015.06.001. hdl:2299/16266.
- Lewis, Carine; Lovatt, Peter J. (August 2013). "Breaking away from set patterns of thinking: Improvisation and divergent thinking". Thinking Skills and Creativity. 9: 46–58. doi:10.1016/j.tsc.2013.03.001.
- Lovatt, Peter (April 2011). "Dance confidence, age and gender". Personality and Individual Differences. 50 (5): 668–672. doi:10.1016/j.paid.2010.12.014.
- Joiner, Richard; Gavin, Jeff; Duffield, Jill; Brosnan, Mark; Crook, Charles; Durndell, Alan; Maras, Pam; Miller, Jane; Scott, Adrian J.; Lovatt, Peter (August 2005). "Gender, Internet Identification, and Internet Anxiety: Correlates of Internet Use". CyberPsychology & Behavior. 8 (4): 371–378. doi:10.1089/cpb.2005.8.371.
- Williams, John N.; Lovatt, Peter (2005). "Phonological Memory and Rule Learning". Language Learning. 55 (S1): 177–233. doi:10.1111/j.0023-8333.2005.00298.x. ISSN 1467-9922.
- Lovatt, Peter; Avons, S.E; Masterson, Jackie (January 2002). "Output Decay in Immediate Serial Recall: Speech Time Revisited". Journal of Memory and Language. 46 (1): 227–243. doi:10.1006/jmla.2001.2806.
- Andrade, Jackie, ed. (2002). Re-evaluating the word-length effect. doi:10.4324/9780203194157. ISBN 978-0-203-19415-7.
- Lovatt, Peter; Avons, S.E.; Masterson, Jackie (February 2000). "The Word-length Effect and Disyllabic Words". The Quarterly Journal of Experimental Psychology Section A. 53 (1): 1–22. doi:10.1080/713755877.
- Lovatt, Peter J.; Bairaktaris, Dimitrios (1995). "A Computational Account of Phonologically Mediated Free Recall". Neural Computation and Psychology: 191–208. doi:10.1007/978-1-4471-3579-1_16.

=== Expert statements ===
- "The BASES Expert Statement on the Use of Music for Movement among People with Parkinson's" (PDF).
