= Abi Elphinstone =

British children's author

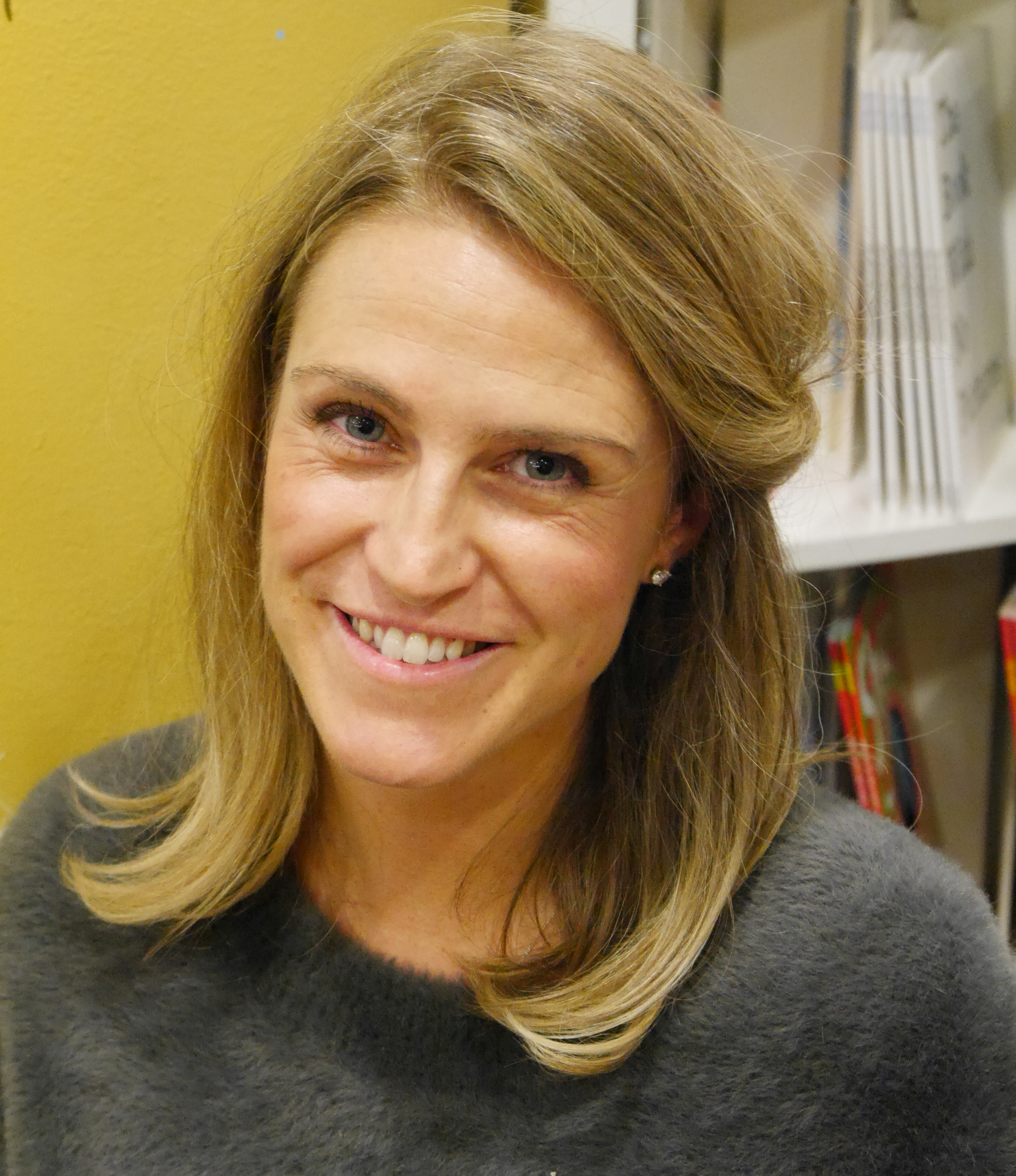
- Elphinstone in 2019
- Education: University of Bristol
- Occupation: Children's author
- Children: 3
- Writing career
- Language: English
- Years active: 2015–present
- Genres: Fantasy, children's literature
- Notable works: Sky Song (2018), Saving Neverland (2023), the Ember Spark series (2024-2025)
- Website: www.abielphinstone.com

Abi Elphinstone is a Scottish author of children's literature.

== Early life ==
Elphinstone grew up near Edzell in Angus, Scotland. She is the eldest of four siblings. She was at primary school in Stracathro and at secondary school in St Andrews. She then went to Bristol university to read English. Before becoming a full-time author, Elphinstone worked as a teacher in various secondary schools in England and Tanzania.

== Career ==
Her first book, The Dreamsnatcher, was published in 2015. Since then, she has published a further thirteen novels, with Sky Song, Saving Neverland and the Ember Spark series all hitting the bestseller charts.

== Personal life ==
Elphinstone is married with three children and lives in Scotland. She is a trustee for the Lamp of Lothian charity and regularly works for literacy charities across the UK.

== Publications ==
- The Dreamsnatcher (2015)
- The Shadow Keeper (2016)
- The Night Spinner (2017)
- Sky Song (2018)
- Rumblestar (2019)
- Everdark (2019)
- The Snow Dragon: The Perfect Book for Cold Winter's Nights, and Cosy Christmas Mornings (2019)
- Jungledrop (2020)
- Casper Tock and the Everdark Wings (2020)
- The Bickery Twins and the Phoenix Tear (2020)
- The Snow Dragon (2020)
- The Crackledawn Dragon (2021)
- Zeb Bolt and the Ember Scroll (2021)
- The Frost Goblin (2022)
- Saving Neverland (2023)
- Ember Spark & The Thunder of Dragons (2024)
- Ember Spark & The Frost Phoenix (2024)
- Ember Spark & The Unicorn's Secret (2025)
