= Maz Evans =

British author

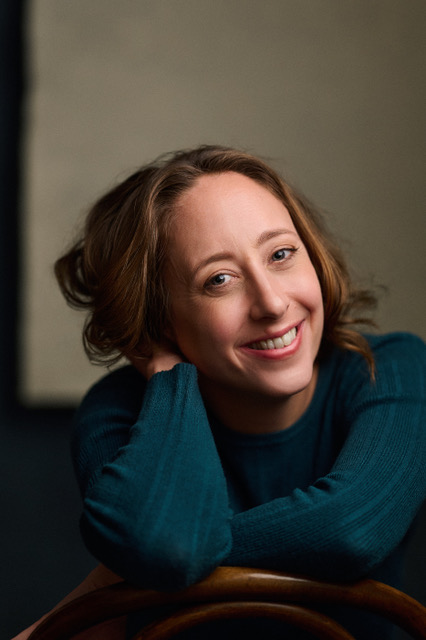
Maz Evans

Maz Evans is a British author, mostly for children.

In October 2023, The Times called Oh Maya Gods! a "perfectly crafted comedy".

Evans is the founder of Book Buddy, which aims to get more books into school libraries. She lives in Dorset and London, with her husband and three children.

== Selected publications ==
- Who Let the Gods Out?, 2017
- Simply the Quest, 2017
- Beyond the Odyssey, 2018
- Against All Gods, 2019
- Over My Dead Body, Headline, 2023
- The Stormy Life of Scarlett Fife, 2023
- Oh Maya Gods!, 2023
- Oh Mummy Mia!, 2024
- Oh What a Knight!, 2024
