= Booksellers Association of the UK and Ireland =

Trade body for retail bookselling

The Booksellers Association of the UK and Ireland (BA) is a trade body founded to promote retail bookselling in the United Kingdom and Ireland. It operates the National Book Token scheme in the UK and sponsors the Whitbread Award The BA represents 95 per cent of British retail booksellers. The BA operates the Batch payments system, an electronic purchasing interface for independent bookshops.

The BA has made calls for increased government support for retail bookselling, in the light of many bookshop closures in recent years.

== Annual conference ==
The Association's annual conference is an important event in the UK bookselling calendar. As well as speeches by key industry figures, it also sees the presentation of the "Nibbies", awards for trade bookselling and booksellers.

== See also ==
- List of booksellers associations
- Books in the United Kingdom
