= A Honeybee Heart Has Five Openings =

2018 book

- Book cover, first edition
- Author: Helen Jukes
- Language: English
- Publisher: Simon & Schuster
- Publication date: 26 July 2018
- ISBN: 978-1471167713

A Honeybee Heart Has Five Openings is a 2018 memoir by Helen Jukes.

The memoir details Juke's decision to reinvent herself as a beekeeper after feeling rootless. Portions of the memoir were originally published in The Junket as essays on beekeeping.

== Summary ==
While living in London Jukes develops a friendship with a beekeeper. She later moves to Oxford for a demanding job and feels miserable. Jukes begins to contemplate keeping her own bees. After she mentions this to friends, they come together during Christmas to buy her a hive of her own.

== Reception ==
The Guardian said the memoir "moved and delighted".
