= Charly Cox =

British writer

- Born: 23 July 1995 (age 31); London, UK
- Occupations: Poet and author
- Notable work: She Must Be Mad
- Honours: Forbes 30 Under 30

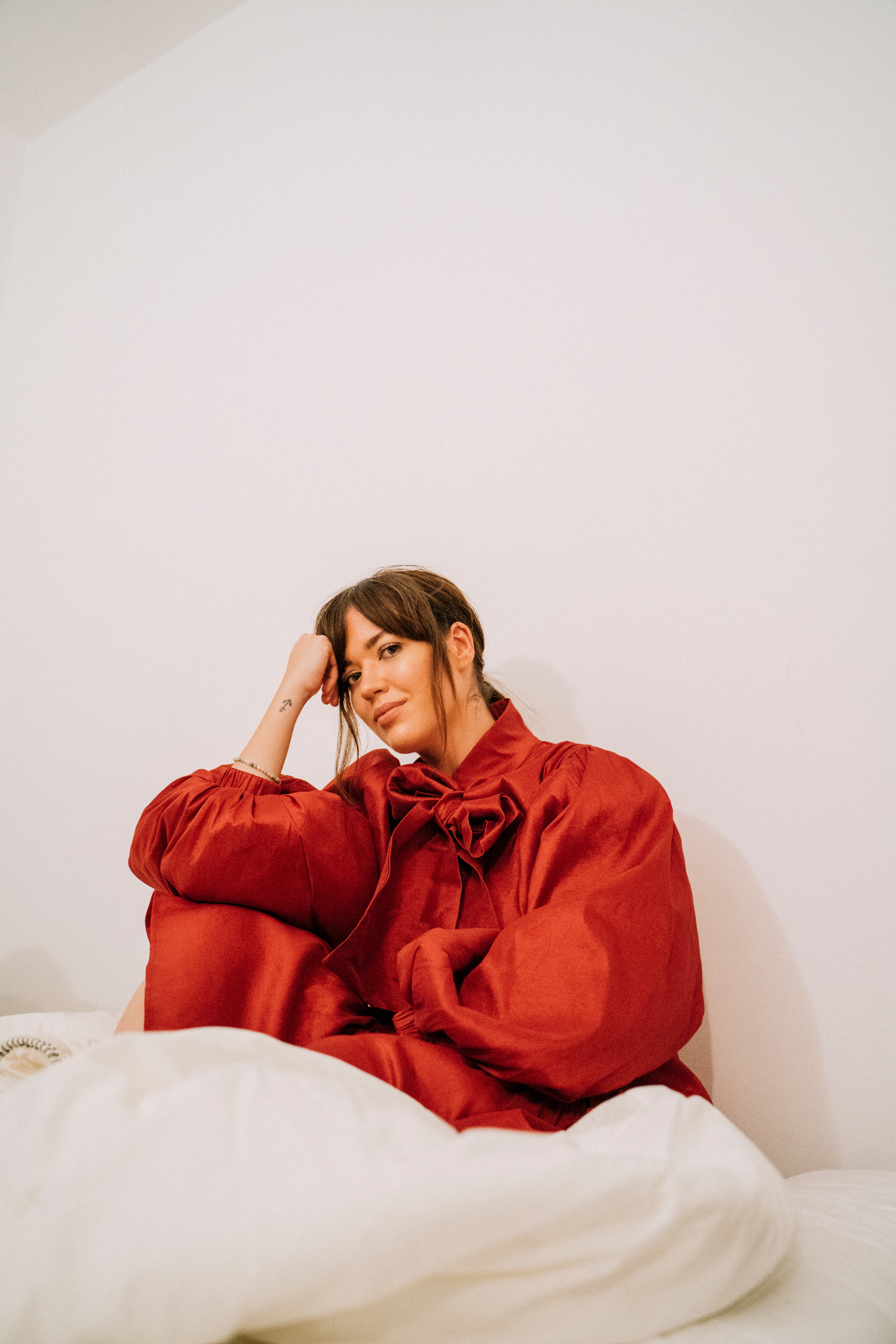

Charly Cox (born 23 July 1995) is a British poet and writer. Cox is a mental health activist. She serves as an ambassador of mental health research charity MQ Foundation.

== Early and personal life ==
Cox was born on 23 July 1995 in London, United Kingdom. She is of British descent.

Cox started writing poems in a diary as a teenager. Over time, it evolved into means of expression and reflection through her personal struggles. At 16 years old, Cox dropped out of Furze Platt Senior school due to crippling anxiety. She was officially diagnosed with anxiety, depression, bipolar disorder 2 and PTSD at 17 years old. Since then, she has considered writing a therapeutic activity.

== Work ==
Cox was working as a full-time digital producer until the stress overwhelmed her and she felt her creative juices drying up—and her friend responded by inquiring about her poetry. In January 2017, Cox decided to post her works publicly on Instagram. She began writing everyday until she received a book deal the following year.

Cox authored UK bestselling poetry and prose debut collection She must be Mad. The book contained her works dating back at age 15–18. It tackled themes such as coming-of-age, body image, mental illnesses, and dating.

Cox moved to Los Angeles and eventually found herself struggling with social media addiction and online persona. In 2019, she published Validate me: A Life of Code-dependency, which reflected her experiences and explored the digital life.

== Recognitions ==
Cox was selected to be at Forbes 30 under 30 under the Art and Culture Category in Europe. In 2018, she was named as one of the 20 Power Players by Elle Magazine.
