= Joanna Cannon =

British novelist

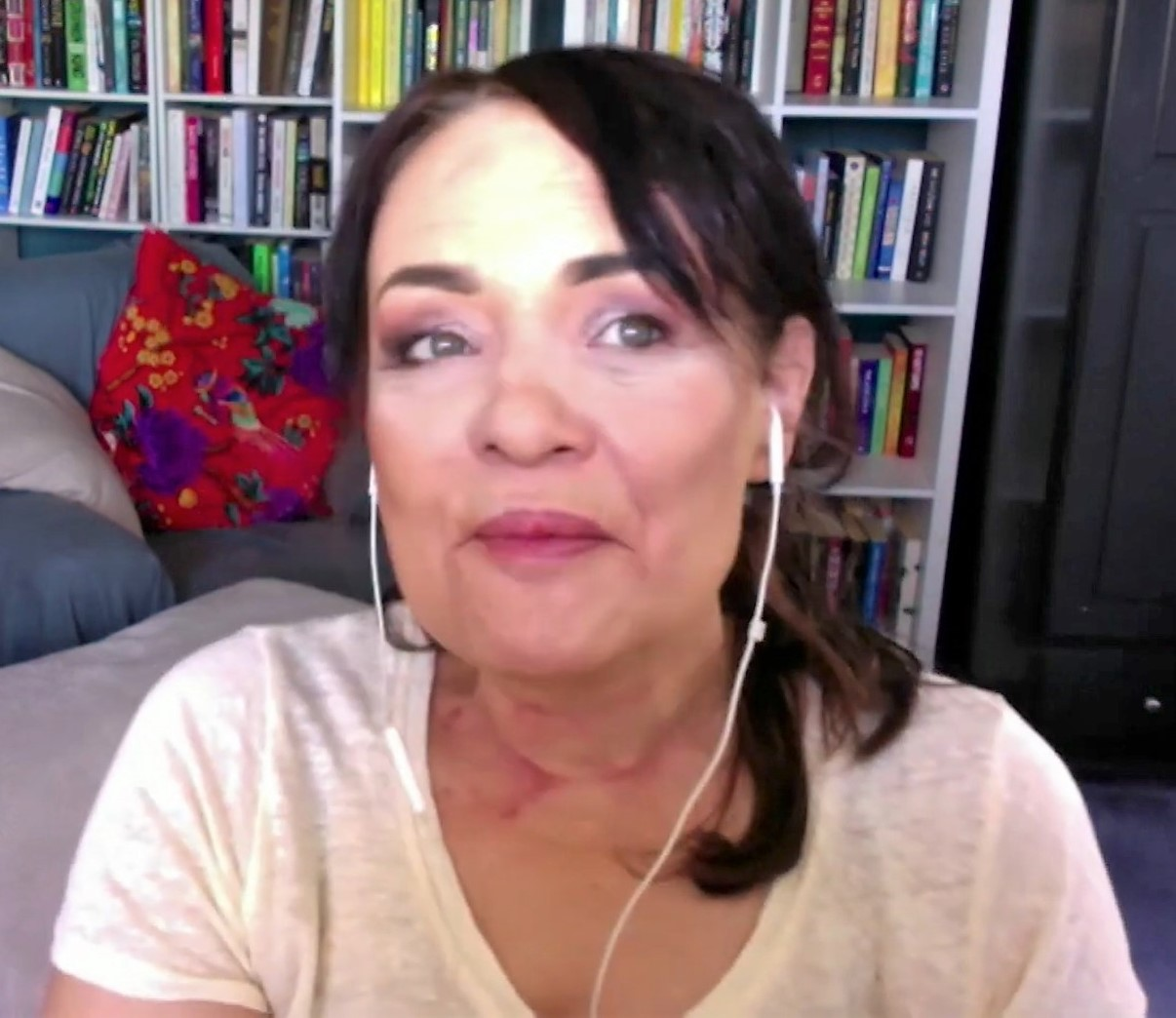
Cannon speaks to the British Library in 2022

Joanna Cannon is a British author and former psychiatrist.

== Biography ==
Joanna Cannon grew up in Derbyshire; her father was a plumber and her mother owned a giftshop. She left school aged 15, and returned to study for her A-Levels in her thirties. She attended Denstone College, Uttoxeter, and the University of Leicester Medical School, from which she graduated in 2010. She worked as a junior doctor, before specialising in psychiatry and then ceasing to practise. She lives in the Peak District with her family and her dog.

Cannon is best known for her debut novel The Trouble with Goats and Sheep, published in 2016, which was shortlisted for the British Book Industry Awards. This was followed by Three Things About Elsie (2018), and a memoir, Breaking and Mending (September 2019). Her third novel, A Tidy Ending was released in 2022, and her fourth, An Unlikely Visitor, in 2026.
