= Hannah Lavery =

Scottish writer, poet, performer (born 1977)

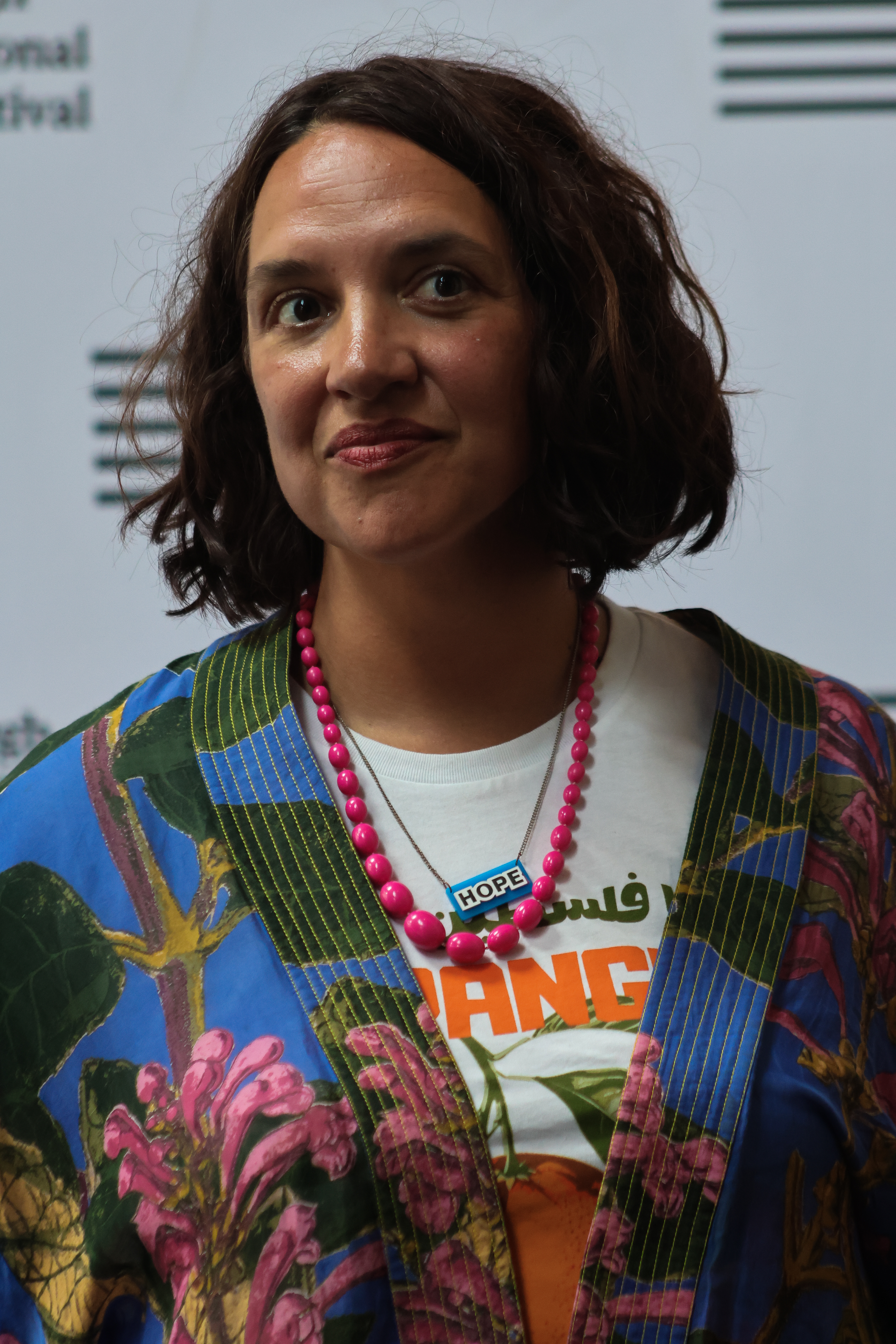
- Lavery at Edinburgh Book Fest 26
- Occupation: Writer
- Notable work: Lament for Sheku Bayoh
- Awards: New Playwright Award, 2019
- Website: www.hannahlavery.com

Hannah Lavery is a Scottish poet, playwright and performer. Her poetry and prose has been published by Gutter Magazine, The Scotsman newspaper, 404 Ink, and others. In September 2021 she took on the role of Edinburgh Makar.

== Work ==
Lavery's poetry pamphlet, Finding Seaglass: Poems from The Drift was published by Stewed Rhubarb Press in May 2019. She has also been a featured poet at many spoken word and poetry nights including Neu! Reekie!, Sonnet Youth, and festivals including Stanza Poetry Festival and Edinburgh International Book Festival. Lavery was awarded a Megaphone Residency for Artists of Colour by The Workers' Theatre in 2016.

The Drift, her autobiographical play, was produced by National Theatre of Scotland and went on tour in 2019.

Lavery's Lament for Sheku Bayoh, commissioned by the Royal Lyceum Theatre, was performed as a work in progress as part of the Edinburgh International Festival 2019. Over the following year, the play was completed and reimagined for a digital audience and streamed from the stage of the Royal Lyceum Theatre as part of a National Theatre of Scotland, Edinburgh International Festival and Royal Lyceum Theatre co-production in 2020. Sheku Bayoh was a 31-year-old gas engineer, husband and father of two who died in police custody in his home town, Kirkcaldy, Fife, on 3 May 2015. A personal response to this tragic event, Lament for Sheku Bayoh throws up questions of identity, community, and belonging in Scotland today, and is an instruction and a reflection on a life lost and the society—our society—who lost it and looked the other way. Critic Mark Fisher, writing in The Guardian, described the work as "...impassioned, poetic and alive with political import." Joyce McMillan writing in The Scotsman described the production as "a beautiful and shattering ritual of rage and mourning that – in the year of George Floyd and Black Lives Matter – is both painfully familiar, and new in its insistence that here too, in bonnie Scotland, black people sometimes cannot breathe, purely because of the colour of their skin." The play was written and directed by Lavery. The cast were Saskia Ashdown, Patricia Panther and Courtney Stoddart, with music by Beldina Odenyo/Heir of the Cursed.

She has contributed to the BBC Radio 4 series The Poet and the Echo, and has been announced as one of Imaginate's Accelerator artists, where she will work on a new piece of writing for ages 10+ called The Protest. The work will explore the moments, the encounters and the individual and collective journey to The Protest and to activism of three young people.

== Awards ==
In November 2019, Lavery was awarded a New Playwright Award from Playwrights Studio Scotland and was named in The List magazine's Scottish Theatre Hot List for 2019. In 2020, she was named as one on BBC Writers Room Scottish Voices of 2020, as well as being chosen by poet and playwright Owen Sheers as one of ten writers currently asking questions that will shape the UK's future, as part of the British Council and National Centre for Writing's International Literature Showcase.
