= Mary Ellis (Civil War nurse) =

United States Civil War nurse

Mary Ellis was a Union nurse during the American Civil War.

== Biography ==
Ellis assisted her husband in raising the 1st Missouri Cavalry regiment, and went to the field along with them. The regiment went to camp on August 1, 1861, and Ellis began nursing immediately when there was a measles outbreak in camp. Ellis performed numerous roles as a nurse, including assistant to the head surgeon. She recounts in a letter to Mary G. Holland that once Ellis fainted during surgery, but quickly returned to service once she was recovered. At the cavalry charge at Sugar Creek, Ellis worked to transport injured soldiers out of the field and to a house that was serving as a hospital. Ellis even saved the life of a man whom the regiment surgeon overdosed on medication. Though the doctors thought his recovery to be impossible and laughed at Ellis's attempts to revive him, Ellis successfully saved the soldier's life. The regiment surgeon came to resent Ellis after this event, though Ellis was certain that the rest of the unit supported her.

In time, Ellis was requested by the chief of the Government Detective Force to act as a detective for the Union Army. During her work as a detective and courier, Ellis wore a quasi-military uniform to protect herself and appear official.

Ultimately, Ellis fell ill and was taken to St. Louis to recover. Unfortunately, Ellis did not recover well enough to return to her service as a nurse. As a volunteer, Ellis was never paid for her work.
