= Phil Earle =

British children's author

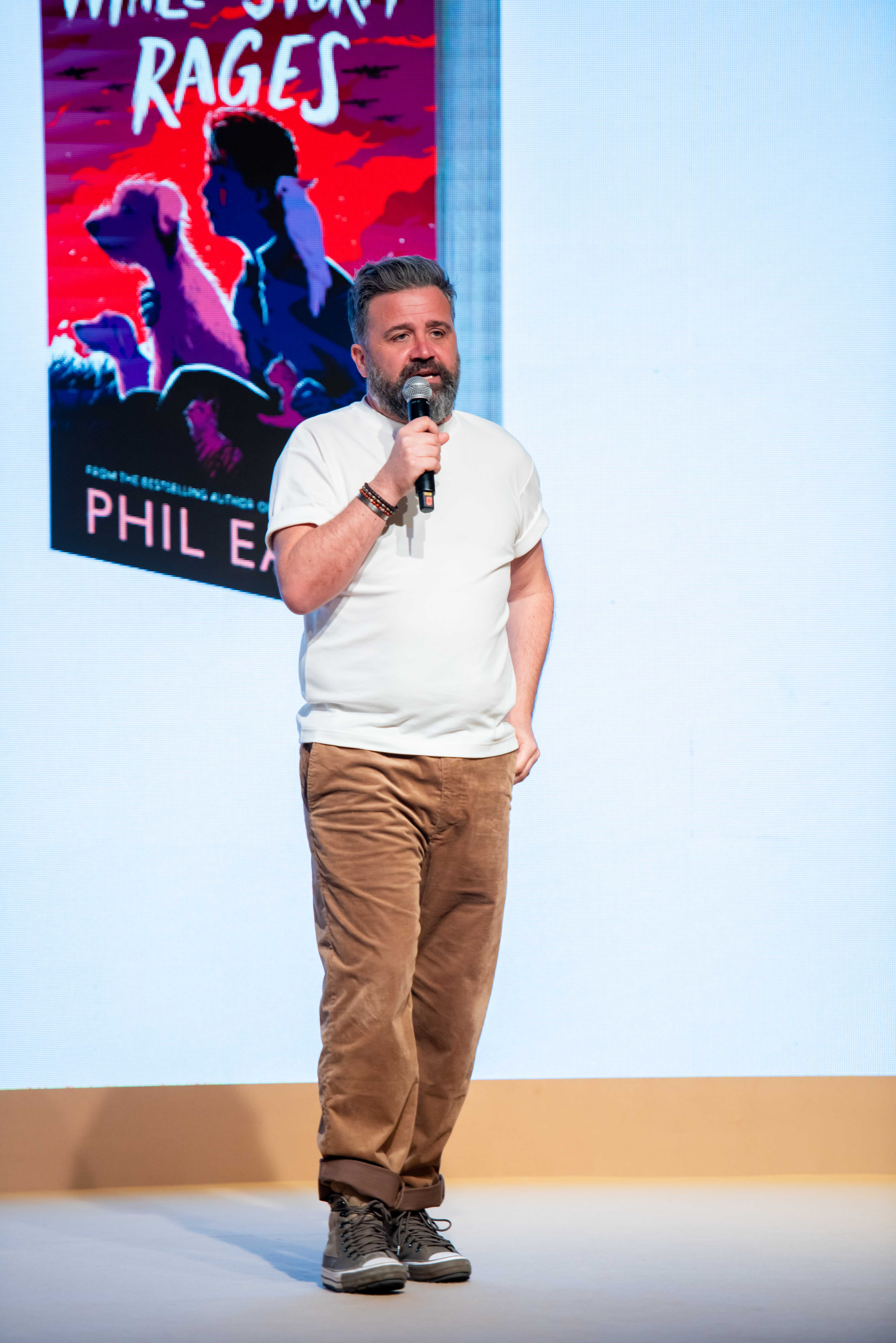
- Earle in 2024
- Education: University of Hull
- Occupation: Author
- Spouse: Lou
- Children: 5
- Writing career
- Genre: Children's literature
- Notable awards: British Book Awards Children's Book of the Year (2022)
- Website: www.philearle.com

Phil Earle is a British children's author.

In 2013, The Guardian described Heroic as "a unique, challenging and engaging read".

In 2016, Earle was appointed as the 13th online Writer in Residence for BookTrust, a children's reading charity.

At the 2022 British Book Awards, When the Sky Falls won Children's Book of the Year. In 2022, The Times called While the Storm Rages "a fresh take on wartime evacuees".

== Personal life ==
Earle is from Kingston upon Hull and studied English and drama at the University of Hull. Earle is married to Lou; they have five children, two dogs, and live in West Yorkshire.

== Publications ==
- Being Billy, 2012
- Heroic, 2013
- Demolition Dad
- When the Sky Falls, Andersen Press, 2021
- Until the Road Ends
- While the Storm Rages, 2022
