= Mary Paulson-Ellis =

Scottish writer and novelist

Mary Paulson-Ellis (born 1968) is a Scottish writer and novelist. She writes across the genres of literary, crime and historical fiction. Her work has appeared in the Guardian and been broadcast on BBC Radio 4. Her books have received a number of awards. Paulson-Ellis’ first novel, The Other Mrs Walker (2016) became a Times bestseller and was named Waterstones Scottish Book of the Year in 2017.

== Life ==
Paulson-Ellis was born in Glasgow, Scotland and grew up in Glasgow and Norwich, England. She studied politics and sociology at Edinburgh University. She has an MLitt in Creative Writing from Glasgow University.

Prior to becoming a full time writer, Paulson-Ellis worked as a script-editor, producer, fundraiser, arts administrator and tour guide.

Paulson-Ellis lives in Edinburgh, where her novels are set.

== Work ==
Paulson-Ellis’ first novel, The Other Mrs Walker was published by Mantle in 2016. It became a Times bestseller and in 2017 was named Waterstones Scottish Book of the Year. She followed this with The Inheritance of Solomon Farthing which was longlisted for the 2020 McIlvanney Prize for Best Scottish Crime Novel and a Historical Writers Association Gold Crown. Emily Noble’s Disgrace, her third novel, was published in 2021.

All three books inhabit what Paulson-Ellis calls ‘the territory of the dead’ and explore the world of people who die with no apparent next of kin.

Paulson-Ellis’ short fiction has appeared in New Writing Scotland, Gutter, the Dangerous Women project and been broadcast on BBC Radio 4. She wrote about the world of those who die with no next of kin for the Guardian, chose her favourite Scottish writing for Books from Scotland, and selected her Top Ten Books for Remembrance Sunday for Waterstones. In 2021 she wrote the introduction to a new edition of Greyfriar’s Bobby for Macmillan Collector’s Library.

In 2019 Val McDermid selected Paulson-Ellis as one of the ten most compelling LGBTQI+ authors working today. The following year, Paulson-Ellis travelled to Hamburg at the invitation of Louise Welsh to represent Scottish writing as part of the British Council Literature Seminar in Germany. She regularly appears on BBC Radio Scotland reviewing what's current in TV, film, theatre, art and books.

Paulson-Ellis is a member of the Scottish Book Trust Live Literature scheme and the Society of Authors.

== Awards ==
- 2016 Amazon Rising Star
- 2017 Rising Star, DIVA Literary Awards (highly commended)
- 2017 Breakthrough Author, Books Are My Bag Readers Awards (shortlisted)
- 2017 Waterstones Scottish Book of the Year
- 2020 Historical Writers Association Gold Crown (longlisted)
- 2020 McIlvanney Prize for Best Scottish Crime Novel (longlisted)

== Bibliography ==
=== Novels ===
- The Other Mrs Walker (2016)
- The Inheritance of Solomon Farthing (2019)
- Emily Noble’s Disgrace (2021)

=== Short fiction ===
- "The Cleaner", BBC Radio 4 (2020)
- "Not My Type" in The Art of Being Dangerous, Leuven Press (2021)
- "The Man from ’53" in Lost Looking Found, Merchiston Press (2021)
- "The Things We Leave Behind", BBC Radio 4 (2021)

=== Non-fiction ===
- "The Curious Case of Mr Lobban", Guardian (2016)
- Introduction to Greyfriars Bobby, Macmillan Collector’s Library (2021)
