= Len Pennie =

Scottish poet and mental health advocate (born 1999)

- Born: 1999 (age 26–27); Airdrie, Lanarkshire, Scotland
- Education: University of St Andrews
- Occupations: Poet, Scots language performer
- Writing career
- Language: Scots
- Notable works: I'm no havin children; Poyums; Poyums Annaw
- Notable awards: Scots Language performer of the year 2021, St Andrews Society of Los Angeles' 2020 Poet Laureate, Scots Book of the Year 2024
- Movement: Scots Language
- Website: Twitter feed

Len Pennie (born 1999) is a Scottish poet, Scots language performer and writer, and mental-health advocate. She became known on social media in 2020 during the COVID-19 pandemic in Scotland for her "Scots word of the day" and poem (Scots: poyum) videos.

== Early life and education ==
Pennie grew up in Airdrie and Dunblane speaking Scots with her parents, grandparents and siblings. Her parents are teachers. She credits her grandparents and mother for teaching her Scots and inspiring in her a love of languages. She also speaks Spanish and French.

Pennie has a Master of Arts in Spanish Language and Literature from the University of St Andrews.

== Career and writing ==
Pennie has worked as a chef.

=== Poetry ===
Growing up, Pennie competed in Robert Burns poetry recital competitions.

When she was furloughed from her work in a restaurant during the first COVID-19 lockdown in Scotland, she began posting a video with a Scots word each day on Twitter to show the pronunciation and meaning of the word and how to use it in context.

Her poems include I'm no havin children, contrasting the English "children" with the Scots "weans", which went viral in October 2020. Following the online popularity of her posts, she says she received online abuse, including misogyny and disagreement as to the status of Scots as a language, and critics including George Galloway suggested Pennie has a "faux identity" and is a supporter of Scottish nationalism; however, Pennie also received support from actor Michael Sheen, comedian and nationalist campaigner Janey Godley, author Neil Gaiman, writer Billy Kay, food writer Nigella Lawson, TV presenter Greg Jenner, and independence supporter and playwright David Greig.

Pennie was one of five Scots commissioned to write a poem for a local Christmas campaign by Lidl about the Daft Days. A recitation of Robert Burns' Rantin’ Rovin’ Robin was shared by the Scottish Poetry Library, and she performed to over 1,200 people for the University of Saint Andrews' online Global Burns Night and at a National Trust for Scotland's Big Burns Night in January 2021. In February 2021, Pennie was commissioned by a campaign group Witches of Scotland to write and perform a poem for their online video In Memorial, to honour those, mainly women, who were persecuted under the Witchcraft Acts. In November 2020, the Saint Andrew's Society of Los Angeles invited her to write a Scottish diaspora poem which resulted in "Scots Nothin Tae Dae Wae That", and in March 2021 they named her their society's poet laureate.

=== Poetry collections ===
Her first collection of poetry Poyums was published by Canongate Books in 2023. It won a British Book Award and was a Sunday Times best seller. The book's poems were written in rhyme with about half in English and half in Scots. Reviewing the collection in The Scotsman, Joyce McMillan lauded it as "show[ing] an impressive command of poetic technique, mainly dodging the doggerel risks of strongly rhyming verse, and sometimes showing an almost Shakespearean command of how to make a sentence flow through a complex rhythmic structure". She noted Pennie's "style is more discursive than lyrical – although she does produce some stunning images" and that "the poems... embody a raging third-wave feminism".

Her second collection, Poyums Annaw was published in 2025, also by Cannongate. In its first week, the book ranked second in the Independent Bookshop Top 20, but 77 places lower in NeilsenIQ's Total Consumer Market (TCM).

Caroline Sanderson in The Bookseller wrote that "With her signature clever rhyming couplets, and arresting titles ... the collections confronts patriarchal norms, gender-based violence and societal injustice with a tender vulnerability, a jousting wit and not a little righteous fury." Reflecting in The Guardian on an interview with Pennie, Alex Clark wrote, "It is telling that poyums annaw features pieces entitled You're Capitalising on Your Trauma and Your Poetry Is Shit. But it is also clear that Pennie remains determined to root out stigma and shame and face them down".

Writing in the Sunday Times, critic Graeme Richardson called the poems, mainly written in anapestic tetrameter "execrable" and Pennie, "the worst poet to have emerged from Scotland since William McGonagall". Richardson also called attention to close similarities between Pennie's poem "'Good Girl', about the Russian dog Laika" and "the excellent poem 'Laika' by Sarah Doyle, published in 2019, and easily found online". In a review in The Scotsman, Joyce McMillan called Richardson's perspective "narrow" and argued that "Pennie’s poems are undoubtedly designed more for performance than to languish prettily on the page, and that may limit their appeal for some. To those who are happy to enter Pennie’s world of rhythm and rhyme, though, they offer a hugely entertaining and intelligent young woman’s perspective on the world we currently inhabit." Regarding the similarities of the two poets' Laika poems, McMillan wrote "It is true that two lines of Pennie's poem Good Girl, including the final one, echo the same thoughts as Doyle's." But also pointed to differences in the two poems' form and style, as well as noting that "Both poems also take their place in a large existing international literature of Laika poems, many of which seem to share thoughts and imagery."

=== Awards ===
Pennie's first book, Poyums, won the Discover Award at the 2025 British Book Awards, and was shortlisted for the Booksellers Association Books Are My Bag Readers' Awards (poetry category).

In 2025, the Chartered Institute of Librarians and Information Professionals (Scotland) recognised Pennie's "inspiring and passionate work to defend and promote the Scots language" by presenting her with the inaugural Presidential Award. Pennie was selected by the then President, Dr David McMenemy for the Award, who stated "Len [is] a brilliant champion of public benefit, preservation of knowledge and intellectual freedom, three of the key pillars of our profession’s ethical values."

== Radio Scotland career ==
Until April 2026 when her programme was dropped, Pennie regularly presented an arts and culture slot in the Michelle McManus afternoon show on the station. The guests on the programme included Award-winning Scottish folk musician, writer and storyteller Karine Polwart, actors Juliet Cadzow and Sanjeev Kohli, American writer and director Charlie Kaufman and artist Vicky Paul.

== Personal life ==
In March 2024, Pennie revealed she had been in a physically and emotionally abusive relationship. Her ex-partner pled guilty in court to domestic violence and was sentenced to a two-year behavioural programme and made subject to a three-year non-harassment order.
