= National Book Tokens =

Voucher scheme

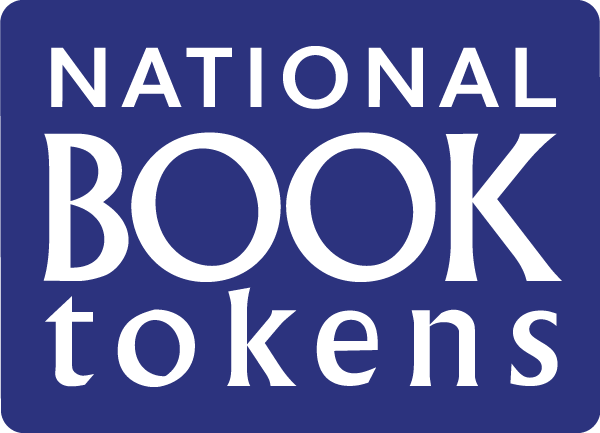
Logo of National Book Tokens

National Book Tokens is a currency-backed voucher scheme, and successor to the book token programme, that is available in the UK and Ireland. They are solely owned and issued by Book Tokens Ltd (part of the Booksellers Association Group of Companies).

National Book Tokens are sold and accepted for exchange in almost all UK bookshops, including all major chains. The NBT scheme also sponsors the UK and Irish World Book Day, as well as other literary events and awards such as The Telegraph Book Club Tour, Global Reads and the Books Are My Bag Readers' Awards.

The Book Tokens scheme was established in 1932, by publisher Harry Raymond. The original format of the tokens was as "lick-and-stick" stamp-like vouchers, which were glued into gift cards and had to be removed by the bookseller redeeming the token. In the 1990s, this design was changed to a "currency-style" voucher, available in a number of different denominations.

After a redesign in 2003 the Book Tokens scheme was relaunched as National Book Tokens, with new vouchers designed by LMC Design.

In 2010, the paper vouchers were phased out. They were replaced by National Book Token gift cards which were identified by a bar code.
