= Emily Woo Zeller =

American actress

- Born: Emily Woo Zeller; November 3, 1983 (age 42); United States
- Education: University of California, Berkeley
- Occupations: Voice actress; audiobook narrator
- Website: emilywoozeller.com

Emily Woo Zeller is an American voice actress and audiobook narrator. She voices Panam Palmer in CD Projekt Red's 2020 videogame Cyberpunk 2077. In the Star Wars canon, she voiced Doctor Aphra in the audiobook of the same name, and narrated the 2020 audiobook of From a Certain Point of View: The Empire Strikes Back.

== Personal life ==
Zeller attended UC Berkeley majoring in dance, theater, and performance studies. In her fifth year, she was awarded one of the school's Eisner Awards for creative talent in 2006. After school, she spent some time living on Lamma Island in Hong Kong.

== Awards and honors ==
In 2020, AudioFile Magazine selected Zeller as a Golden Voice narrator.

=== Awards ===
| Year | Title | Award | Result | Ref. |
|---|---|---|---|---|
| 2013 | Gulp: Adventures on the Alimentary Canal (2013) by Mary Roach | Earphones Award | Winner | |
| 2013 | Ties That Bind, Ties That Break (1999) by Lensey Namioka | Earphones Award | Winner | |
| 2014 | The Life-Changing Magic of Tidying Up (2014) by Marie Kondo | Earphones Award | Winner | |
| 2015 | Under a Painted Sky (2015) by Stacey Lee | Earphones Award | Winner | |
| 2017 | Kitchen Chinese: A Novel About Food, Family, and Finding Yourself (2010) by Ann Mah | Earphones Award | Winner | |
| 2018 | After the Eclipse: A Mother's Murder, a Daughter's Search (2017) by Sarah Perry | Earphones Award | Winner | |
| 2018 | Fire Road: The Napalm Girl's Journey through the Horrors of War to Faith, Forgiveness, and Peace (2017) by Kim Phuc Phan Thi and Ashley Wiersma | Audie Award for Faith-Based Fiction and Nonfiction | Winner | |
| 2018 | Fire Road: The Napalm Girl's Journey through the Horrors of War to Faith, Forgiveness, and Peace (2017) by Kim Phuc Phan Thi and Ashley Wiersma | Earphones Award | Winner | |
| 2018 | For a Muse of Fire (2018) by Heidi Heilig | Earphones Award | Winner | |
| 2018 | A Girl Divided (2018) by Ellen Lindseth | Earphones Award | Winner | |
| 2018 | The Poppy War (2018) by R. F. Kuang | Earphones Award | Winner | |
| 2019 | An Affair of Poisons (2019) by Addie Thorley | Earphones Award | Winner | |
| 2019 | The Bride Test (2019) by Helen Hoang | Earphones Award | Winner | |
| 2019 | My Detective (2019) by Jeffrey Fleishman | Earphones Award | Winner | |
| 2019 | The Dragon Republic (2019) by R. F. Kuang | Earphones Award | Winner | |
| 2019 | Paper Son (2019) by S. J. Rozan | Earphones Award | Winner | |
| 2020 | The Bride Test (2019) by Helen Hoang | Audie Award for Romance | Finalist | |
| 2020 | Kintsugi: Finding Strength in Imperfection by Celine Santini | Independent Audiobook Award for Best Female Narrator | Winner | |
| 2020 | Kintsugi: Finding Strength in Imperfection by Celine Santini | Independent Audiobook Award for Nonfiction | Winner | |
| 2020 | Pink Mountain on Locust Island (2018) by Jamie Marina Lau | Earphones Award | Winner | |
| 2020 | White Ivy (2020) by Susie Yang | Earphones Award | Winner | |
| 2020 | Wuhan Diary: Dispatches from a Quarantined City (2020) by Fang Fang, with Michael Berry [Trans.] | Earphones Award | Winner | |
| 2021 | The Burning God (2020) by R. F. Kuang | Earphones Award | Winner | |
| 2021 | Six Crimson Cranes (2021) by Elizabeth Lim | Earphones Award | Winner | |
| 2022 | The Cartographers (2022) by Peng Shepherd | Earphones Award | Winner | |
| 2022 | Family Business (2021) by S. J. Rozan | Earphones Award | Winner | |
| 2022 | Last Night at the Telegraph Club (2021) by Malinda Lo | Amazing Audiobooks for Young Adults | Top 10 | |

=== "Best of" lists ===
| Year | Title | Award | Ref. |
|---|---|---|---|
| 2013 | Gulp: Adventures on the Alimentary Canal (2013) by Mary Roach | AudioFile Best of Contemporary Culture | |
| 2015 | The Life-Changing Magic of Tidying Up (2014) by Marie Kondo | AudioFile Best of Personal Growth | |
| 2018 | The Poppy War (2018) by R. F. Kuang | AudioFile Best of Sci-Fi, Fantasy & Horror | |
| 2019 | The Bride Test (2019) by Helen Hoang | AudioFile Best of Romance | |
| 2020 | The Way You Make Me Feel by Maurene Goo | ALSC Notable Children's Recordings | |
| 2020 | Wicked Fox by Kat Cho | Amazing Audiobooks for Young Adults | |
| 2021 | Six Crimson Cranes (2021) by Elizabeth Lim | AudioFile Best of Young Adult | |
| 2022 | Rent a Boyfriend (2020) by Gloria Chao | Amazing Audiobooks for Young Adults | |
| 2022 | Six Crimson Cranes (2021) by Elizabeth Lim | Amazing Audiobooks for Young Adults | |

== Filmography ==
| Year | Title | Role | Notes | Source |
|---|---|---|---|---|
| 2015 | Pokémon the Movie: Hoopa and the Clash of Ages | Meray | English dub | |
| 2016 | Pokémon the Series: XYZ | Bryony | English dub | |
| 2020 | Cyberpunk 2077 | Panam Palmer | English dub | |
| 2021 | Yasuke | Additional Voices | English dub | |
