= Babel, or the Necessity of Violence =

2022 novel by R. F. Kuang

Babel: Or the Necessity of Violence
- Author: R. F. Kuang
- Audio read by: Chris Lew Kum Hoi; Billie Fulford-Brown
- Cover artist: Nico Delort
- Language: English
- Genre: Speculative fiction, alternative history
- Set in: Oxford, England, 1836
- Publisher: Harper Voyager
- Publication date: August 23, 2022
- Publication place: United States
- Media type: Print, ebook
- Pages: 545 pp.
- ISBN: 9780063021426 (hardcover 1st ed.)
- OCLC: 1322235897
- Dewey Decimal: 813/.6
- LC Class: PS3611.U17 B33 2022b

Babel, or The Necessity of Violence: An Arcane History of the Oxford Translators' Revolution is a 2022 novel of speculative fiction by R. F. Kuang set in a fantastical version of Oxford in 1830s England (the story concludes in 1840). Thematically similar to The Poppy War (2018–20), Kuang's first book series, the book criticizes British imperialism, racism and capitalism, and the complicity of academia, knowledge, and language in perpetuating and enabling them.

Babel is set in an alternative reality in which Britain's global economic and colonial supremacy are fueled by the use of magical silver bars. Their power comes from capturing what is "lost in translation" between words in different languages that have similar, but not identical, meanings. To harness this power, Oxford University created the Royal Institute of Translation, nicknamed "Babel", where scholars work to find match-pairs. The plot focuses on four new students at the institute, their growing awareness that their academic efforts maintain Britain's imperialist supremacy, their debate over how to prevent the First Opium War, and the use of violence.

It debuted at the first spot on The New York Times Best Seller list, and won Blackwell's Books of the Year for Fiction in 2022 and the 2022 Nebula Award for Best Novel.

== Plot ==
An orphan from Canton is taken in by Richard Lovell, a Babel professor, and takes the English name Robin Swift. Lovell has Robin tutored in Latin and Greek as well as Mandarin in order to prepare him for admission to Babel. It quickly becomes apparent that Lovell is Robin's biological father, but neither is willing to discuss this out loud. One day, Robin embarrasses Lovell by being late to one of his lessons and is brutally beaten and threatened with being returned to Canton to live in poverty. Nevertheless, Robin excels in his studies and, after seven years, is accepted into Babel.

Robin quickly befriends the other members of his first-year cohort: Ramy from Calcutta, Victoire from Haiti, and Letty, a white British admiral's daughter. There they learn that the effectiveness of translating European languages into English is diminishing and that "exotic" languages like Mandarin, Haitian Creole, and Arabic are considered the future of translation magic. In his first week, Robin encounters Griffin, his elder half-brother—another half-Chinese son of Professor Lovell—who recruits him into the Hermes Society, a clandestine organization seeking to undermine Britain's silver supremacy. Griffin explains to Robin how Babel exploits the languages of foreign nations only in order to solidify the British Empire's dominance over them. Robin goes along with Griffin's plans, abetting thefts of silver bars to aid Hermes, but remains conflicted, torn between his distaste for British colonial excess and inequality and his potential comfortable future as an imperial translator. This tension—and the fact that Robin did not learn more about the secrets of Hermes—leads him to eventually break contact with Griffin and the secret society in his third year at Oxford.

Robin, Ramy, Victoire, and Letty join Lovell on a sea-trip to Canton to act as translators in the escalating conflict between the Qing Dynasty and British Empire over the Qing refusal to allow free trade or opium to enter China. Robin witnesses the contempt the British have for the Chinese and, after meeting with Lin Zexu, the official sent to stop the opium trade, and witnessing an opium den firsthand, he develops reservations about the British project there. When Lin burns the stockpile of confiscated opium, the Babel affiliates depart for England. On shipboard, Lovell again berates Robin for his supposed complicity with the Qing. However, Robin refuses to back down, and kills Lovell by using a silver bar to blow a hole in his chest. Ramy, Victoire, and Letty help Robin dispose of the body of Richard Lovell and hide their crime.

Once they return to Britain, they discover in Lovell's effects that the negotiations in China were a sham; Lovell and others were only trying to create a pretext for war, allowing Britain to seize China's stockpiles of silver. Letty walks in on Robin, Ramy, and Victoire discussing Hermes business, but she swears to stand by them after they explain their experiences of discrimination and the scale of British imperial atrocities. The group contacts Hermes, whose members opt to lobby Parliament and whip up public opposition to war with China with a pamphlet campaign. Griffin confides in Robin that he believes only violence can bring the empire down and teaches Robin to use firearms. However, Letty betrays them and, as the police raid the Hermes headquarters, shoots and kills Ramy.

Griffin breaks Victoire and Robin out of prison, but is killed during the escape. The pair decide that only force can hope to succeed, and resolve to capture Babel's college tower. They enter the college, recruiting a few of the students and faculty while expelling the rest. They start removing the resonance rods that allow the translation magic across Britain to function, throwing the country into disarray, and announce their intent to continue doing so until their demands for peace with China are met. They attract supporters among radicals and reformers who fortify Oxford against the British army. Without access to Babel and its ledgers, other translators cannot maintain the silverwork supporting Britain's infrastructure, culminating with the destruction of Westminster Bridge. Letty arrives to plead with them to surrender, promising that the army will raid the tower at dawn. Robin, spiraling into despair since Canton, resolves to destroy the tower and its contents and render its silver useless for future enchantment. Victoire escapes into hiding, and Robin and the remaining Babel scholars destroy the tower with themselves inside, crippling the Silver Industrial Revolution and leaving the future of the British Empire uncertain.

== Characters ==
Robin Swift - Son of merchants driven to poverty by his uncle's opium addiction. Able to pass for white in certain lights, Robin feels conflicted by his desire to be accepted by Babel and his father, Professor Lovell, and his growing understanding that the system they perpetuate is immoral.

Ramiz Rafi "Ramy" Mirza - A Muslim Indian student from Calcutta and Robin's best friend and roommate. Ramy was taken from his family by Sir Horace Wilson, and lived on his estate in Yorkshire before being sent to Babel. He is loud, brilliant, and charming.

Letitia "Letty" Price - The daughter of a British former admiral and Victoire's roommate. She experiences the unfair treatment of misogyny of 1830s England, but doesn't see the racism Victoire has to go through.

Victoire Desgraves - A Haitian student raised in France and Letty's roommate. Victoire lived in slavery in France, reading books and studying throughout her time there. She was sent to Babel because of her expertise in Haitian Creole. Victoire is resilient and moral; she is often the mediator in heated discussions.

Professor Richard Lovell - A professor of Chinese and committed imperialist. Robin's adoptive (later revealed to be biological) father, whose expectations for his son's linguistic skills drives Robin's internal conflict. His focus on China is driven by his belief that extracting China's silver and linguistic resources is the best way to enrich the British empire, leading to his adoption of Robin and his predecessor.

Griffin Lovell - Robin's half-brother by their shared father, and Lovell's first attempt at a Chinese translation student. Upon realizing the systems he works for, he becomes a member of the Hermes Society and later recruits Robin.

Mrs. Piper - Lovell's kindly Scottish housekeeper.

Anthony Ribben - A Black older student at Babel and the member of the Hermes Society who recruits Victoire and Ramy. Unlike Griffin, Anthony believes that social change can be brought about by non-violent means, from pamphlets and public opinion to blackmailing members of Parliament.

== Literary influences ==
Babel takes influences from works written by Frantz Fanon, a psychiatrist and philosopher who explores the racial inferiority and psychological damage that can result from colonialism. It was also influenced by Edward Said's research on the fictional portrayal of Orientalism and colonialism. The magic system used in the novel was inspired by Greek mythology and 19th century German philologists searching for the realm of meaning.

== Themes ==
=== Imperialism and colonialism ===
The novel depicts the imperialist-colonial relationship as fundamentally unequal and transactional. This is paralleled through Lovell and Robin: Lovell holds the power and resources, while Robin, as the colonial subject, is reshaped through Anglicisation and expected to be forever grateful. Robin is eager to please Lovell, and as he is accepted into Oxford and enters Babel this extends to his academic life. This is a response to the oppression he faces, and he identifies more with the colonizers as he is taught to strive for a privileged position that he would not have access to if not for British imperialism. Later in the novel, whenever Robin challenges either Lovell or the British imperial system, Lovell rebukes him for being ungrateful—an accusation that highlights the manipulative dynamics of their relationship.

=== Language and translation ===
Translation is used to explore other themes in the novel. It is tied to the process of colonialism, revolution, and identity and assimilation. Because translation is an integral component of Babel's magic system, it is portrayed as a tool for colonization that benefits Britain but not the disadvantaged countries that the languages are originally from. In this way, language is used as a commodity and translation as a trade.

This literal translation mirrors the metaphorical translation that the main characters undergo, and is used as a way of portraying assimilation. Robin changes his name and models his actions and opinions after Lovell's, translating himself as a form of assimilation to a new culture in order to be accepted.

=== Classism ===
The benefits of the novel's magic silver-working are shown to be reserved for the wealthy upper-class. Not only is silver not used for those of lower income, but the innovations displace the working class and put many of them out of jobs. When the students at Babel eventually strike and revolt, they are joined and supported by the working class in protest to the treatment that imperialistic Britain has given to both disadvantaged groups.

== Reception ==
=== Reviews ===
Babel debuted in September 2022 at the top spot on The New York Times Best Seller list for hardcover fiction. It was generally well received, including starred reviews from Booklist and Kirkus Reviews.

Booklist called the novel "engaging" and "richly descriptive". while Kirkus said it was "ambitious and powerful while displaying a deep love of language and literature". Kirkus further called it "an expansive, sympathetic, and nevertheless scathing critique of Western imperialism and how individuals are forced to make their peace with the system and survive or to fight back and face the consequences". Amal El-Mohtar, writing for The New York Times Book Review wrote, "Babel derives its power from sustaining a contradiction, from trying to hold in your head both love and hatred for the charming thing that sustains itself by devouring you."

Critics discussed Kuang's attempt to complicate the modern understanding of academia in the 1830s, including the research and footnotes she placed throughout the novel. The Guardian said, "This is a scholarly book by a superb scholar", noting that "the pages are heavy with footnotes; not the more usual whimsical ones ... but academic notes, hectoring and preachy in a parody of the 19th-century tomes Swift and his friends at Oxford must study" The review remarked that the characters "are pretentious, but vulnerable too, and the balance is lovely". Similarly, the Chicago Review of Books highlighted how Babel "educates and urges us to reframe—to (re)translate—the dominant narrative of what the West calls its civilization." They called the novel "brilliant both in concept and execution, ... a page-turner with footnotes, a thriller with a higher purpose, a Bildungsroman where the stakes matter". Library Journal echoed the sentiment, writing about how Kuang "prompts readers to question the ethics of both empire and academia".

There were also qualified or negative reviews. Paste noted that Babel is "a meticulously researched period piece, a primal scream from the traditionally unheard". However, they added, "its determination to make sure its (admittedly important) message is heard, means a significant chunk of this doorstopper's 500+ pages feels didactic and lecture-y, rather than fully transformative." Publishers Weekly negatively reviewed the novel, saying, "Kuang underwhelms with a didactic, unsubtle take on dark academia and imperialism." They explained, the "narrative is frequently interrupted by lectures on why imperialism is bad, not trusting the reader or the plot itself enough to know that this message will be clear from the events as they unfold. Kuang assumes an audience that disagrees with her, and the result keeps readers who are already aware of the evils of racism and empire at arm's length. The characters, meanwhile, often feel dubiously motivated."

=== Awards and honors ===
Amazon, Kirkus Reviews, NPR, and The Washington Post named Babel: Or the Necessity of Violence one of the best fantasy books of the year. Barnes & Noble named it one of the top ten books of the year, regardless of genre.

The administrators of the 2023 Hugo Awards, held at Chengdu Worldcon, ruled Babel not eligible for nomination without further explanation. A later report based on emails shared from the awards' administrative panel revealed that the book was likely ruled ineligible in an attempt to avoid running afoul of Chinese censorship laws.

Year	Award	Category	Result	Ref.
2022	Blackwell's Books of the Year	Fiction	Won	
2022	Goodreads Choice Award	Fantasy	Nominated	
2022	Kirkus Reviews Best of 2022	SF & Fantasy	Listed	
2022	Nebula Award	Novel	Won	
2022	New England Book Award	—	Shortlisted	
2022	Waterstones Book of the Year	—	Shortlisted	
2023	Alex Award	—	Won	
2023	British Book Award	Fiction	Won	
2023	Dragon Award	Fantasy Novel	Shortlisted	
2023	Ignyte Awards	Adult Novel	Finalist	
2023	Locus Award	Fantasy Novel	Won	
2023	RUSA CODES Reading List	Fantasy	Shortlisted	
2024	(Booksellers) Indie Book Award	Fiction	Shortlisted	
2024	Prix Imaginales	Meilleur roman étranger	Shortlisted	
2026	Seiun Award	Translated novel	Won	

== Adaptation ==
The novel was optioned for a film or television adaptation in 2024 by wiip to be produced at Temple Hill Entertainment.

The audiobook was read by Chris Lew Kum Hoi, with footnotes read by Billie Fulford-Brown to accurately portray the narrator shift utilized in the novel.
