= Waterstones Book of the Year =

Annual literary award

The Waterstones Book of the Year, established in 2012, is an annual award presented to a book published in the previous 12 months. Waterstones' booksellers nominate and vote to determine the winners and finalists for the prize.

Award winners receive "full and committed backing" from Waterstones both in-person and online.

== Recipients ==
Waterstones Book of the Year winners and finalists
Year	Author	Title	Result	Ref.
2012	Russell Norman	Polpo: A Venetian Cookbook (of Sorts)	Won	
2012	Laurent Binet	HHhH	Shortlisted	
2012	Artemis Cooper	Patrick Leigh Fermor	Shortlisted	
2012	Simon Garfield	On the Map	Shortlisted	
2012	Robert Macfarlane	The Old Ways	Shortlisted	
2012	Hilary Mantel	Bring Up the Bodies	Shortlisted	
2013	John Williams	Stoner	Won	
2013	Kate Atkinson	Life After Life	Shortlisted	
2013	Julian Barnes	Levels of Life	Shortlisted	
2013	Stephen Collins	The Gigantic Beard That Was Evil	Shortlisted	
2013	Aleksandra Mizielińska	Maps	Shortlisted	
2013	Nina Stibbe	Love, Nina: Despatches from Family Life	Shortlisted	
2014	Jessie Burton	The Miniaturist	Won	
2014	Laura Bates	Everyday Sexism	Shortlisted	
2014	Richard Flanagan	The Narrow Road to the Deep North	Shortlisted	
2014	Sabrina Ghayour	Persiana: Recipes from the Middle East & Beyond	Shortlisted	
2014	Oliver Jeffers	Once Upon an Alphabet	Shortlisted	
2014	Marina Keegan	The Opposite of Loneliness: Essays & Stories	Shortlisted	
2014	Helen Macdonald	H Is for Hawk	Shortlisted	
2014	Thomas Piketty	Capital in the Twenty-First Century	Shortlisted	
2015	Coralie Bickford-Smith	The Fox and the Star	Won	
2015	Harper Lee	Go Set a Watchman	Shortlisted	
2015	Elena Ferrante	My Brilliant Friend	Shortlisted	
2015	Paula Hawkins	The Girl on the Train	Shortlisted	
2015	James Rebanks	The Shepherd's Life	Shortlisted	
2015	Matt Haig	Reasons to Stay Alive	Shortlisted	
2015	Mary Beard	SPQR: A History of Ancient Rome	Shortlisted	
2015	Hanya Yanagihara	A Little Life	Shortlisted	
2016	Sarah Perry	The Essex Serpent	Won	
2016	J. K. Rowling	Harry Potter and the Cursed Child	Shortlisted	
2016	Emma-Jane Kirby	The Optician of Lampedusa	Shortlisted	
2016	Beatrix Potter with Quentin Blake (illus.)	The Tale of Kitty-in-Boots	Shortlisted	
2016	Christopher de Hamel	Meetings with Remarkable Manuscripts	Shortlisted	
2016	Paul Kalanithi	When Breath Becomes Air	Shortlisted	
2017	Philip Pullman	La Belle Sauvage: Book of Dust Volume One	Won	
2017	Elena Favilli and Francesca Cavallo	Good Night Stories for Rebel Girls	Shortlisted	
2017	George Saunders	Lincoln in the Bardo	Shortlisted	
2017	Jenny Uglow	Mr. Lear	Shortlisted	
2017	Yanis Varoufakis	Talking to My Daughter About the Economy	Shortlisted	
2017	Frances Hardinge	A Skinful of Shadows	Shortlisted	
2017	Robert Macfarlane and Jackie Morris	The Lost Words	Shortlisted	
2018	Sally Rooney	Normal People	Won	
2018	Isabel Hardman	Why We Get the Wrong Politicians	Shortlisted	
2018	Dan Jones and Marina Amaral	The Colour of Time: A New History of the World, 1850–1960	Shortlisted	
2018	The Secret Barrister	The Secret Barrister	Shortlisted	
2018	Dolly Alderton	Everything I Know About Love	Shortlisted	
2018	Henry Eliot	The Penguin Classics Book	Shortlisted	
2018	Madeline Miller	Circe	Shortlisted	
2018	Fiona Waters and Frann Preston-Gannon	I Am the Seed that Grew the Tree	Shortlisted	
2019	Charlie Mackesy	The Boy, the Mole, the Fox and the Horse	Won	
2019	Margaret Atwood	The Testaments	Shortlisted	
2019	Candice Carty-Williams	Queenie	Shortlisted	
2019	Bridget Collins	The Binding	Shortlisted	
2019	Robert Macfarlane	Underland	Shortlisted	
2019	Max Porter	Lanny	Shortlisted	
2019	Greta Thunberg	No One Is Too Small to Make a Difference	Shortlisted	
2020	Maggie O'Farrell	Hamnet	Won	
2020	Dara McAnulty	Diary of a Young Naturalist	Shortlisted	
2020	Brit Bennett	The Vanishing Half	Shortlisted	
2020	Michiko Kakutani	Ex Libris	Shortlisted	
2020	Gavin Francis	Island Dreams	Shortlisted	
2020	Philippe Sands	The Ratline	Shortlisted	
2020	Craig Brown	One, Two, Three, Four: The Beatles in Time	Shortlisted	
2020	Naoise Dolan	Exciting Times	Shortlisted	
2020	Bolu Babalola	Love in Colour	Shortlisted	
2020	David Olusoga	Black and British: A Short, Essential History	Shortlisted	
2020	Fiona Waters with Britta Teckentrup (illus.)	Tiger, Tiger, Burning Bright!	Shortlisted	
2020	Rundell Katherine (ed)	The Book of Hopes	Shortlisted	
2021	Paul McCartney with Paul Muldoon (ed.)	The Lyrics	Won	
2021	Jonathan Drori with Lucille Clerc (illus.)	Around the World in 80 Plants	Shortlisted	
2021	Janice Hallett	The Appeal	Shortlisted	
2021	Kiran Millwood Hargrave with Tom de Freston (illus.)	Julia and the Shark	Shortlisted	
2021	Charlotte Higgins with Chris Ofili (illus.)	Greek Myths	Shortlisted	
2021	Kazuo Ishiguro	Klara and the Sun	Shortlisted	
2021	Amy Jeffs	Storyland	Shortlisted	
2021	Caleb Azumah Nelson	Open Water	Shortlisted	
2021	Marcus Rashford and Carl Anka	You Are a Champion	Shortlisted	
2021	Jennifer Saint	Ariadne	Shortlisted	
2021	Adam Silvera	They Both Die at the End	Shortlisted	
2021	Colin Thubron	Amur River	Shortlisted	
2021	Tracey Turner and Andrew Donkin with Libby VanderPloeg (illus.)	British Museum: History of the World in 25 Cities	Shortlisted	
2022	Katy Hessel	The Story of Art without Men	Won	
2022	Maggie O'Farrell	The Marriage Portrait	Shortlisted	
2022	Alice Oseman	Heartstopper Volume 1	Shortlisted	
2022	Bonnie Garmus	Lessons in Chemistry	Shortlisted	
2022	Jonathan Freedland	The Escape Artist	Shortlisted	
2022	Thomas Halliday	Otherlands	Shortlisted	
2022	Katherine Rundell with Talya Baldwin (illus.)	In the Golden Mole	Shortlisted	
2022	Jeremy Lee	Cooking	Shortlisted	
2022	R. F. Kuang	Babel	Shortlisted	
2022	A. F. Steadman	Skandar and the Unicorn Thief	Shortlisted	
2023	Katherine Rundell	Impossible Creatures	Won	
2023	Chris Broad	Abroad in Japan	Shortlisted	
2023	G. T. Karber	Murdle	Shortlisted	
2023	Rebecca F. Kuang	Yellowface	Shortlisted	
2023	Ann Patchett	Tom Lake	Shortlisted	
2023	Rick Rubin	The Creative Act: A Way of Being	Shortlisted	
2023	Zadie Smith	The Fraud	Shortlisted	
2023	Chris van Tulleken	Ultra-Processed People: Why Do We All Eat Stuff That Isn't...	Shortlisted	
2023	Alice Winn	In Memoriam	Shortlisted	
2023	Rebecca Yarros	Fourth Wing	Shortlisted	
2023	Lou Peacock and Matt Hunt	A Whale of a Time: A Funny Poem for Every Day of the Year	Shortlisted	
2023	Mary Beard	Emperor of Rome	Shortlisted	
2024	Asako Yuzuki with Polly Barton (trans.)	Butter	Won	
2024	Chloe Dalton	Raising Hare	Shortlisted	
2024	Percival Everett	James	Shortlisted	
2024	Holly Jackson	The Reappearance of Rachel Price	Shortlisted	
2024	Anna Jones	Easy Wins	Shortlisted	
2024	Olivia Laing	The Garden Against Time	Shortlisted	
2024	Ferdia Lennon	Glorious Exploits	Shortlisted	
2024	Alice Loxton	Eighteen: A History of Britain in 18 Young Lives	Shortlisted	
2024	Ben Macintyre	The Siege	Shortlisted	
2024	Coco Mellors	Blue Sisters	Shortlisted	
2024	Ross Montgomery	I Am Rebel	Shortlisted	
2024	Gavin Pretor-Pinney with William Grill (illus.)	Cloudspotting for Beginners	Shortlisted	
2024	Sally Rooney	Intermezzo	Shortlisted	
2024	William Shakespeare with Emily Sutton (illus.)	Shakespeare’s First Folio: All the Plays – A Children’s Edition	Shortlisted	
2024	Colm Tóibín	Long Island	Shortlisted	
2025	Lucy Steeds	The Artist	Won	
2025	David Attenborough with Colin Butfield	Ocean: Earth's last wilderness	Shortlisted	
2025	Natasha Browne	Universality	Shortlisted	
2025	Neill Cameron	Donut Squad: Take Over the World!	Shortlisted	
2025	Suzanne Collins	Sunrise on the Reaping	Shortlisted	
2025	James Fox	Craftland	Shortlisted	
2025	Antonia Hodgson	The Raven Scholar	Shortlisted	
2025	Anna James	Alice with a Why	Shortlisted	
2025	R. F. Kuang	Katabasis	Shortlisted	
2025	William Maxwell	So Long, See You Tomorrow	Shortlisted	
2025	Mikey Please	The Café at the Edge of the Woods	Shortlisted	
2025	Mel Robbins	The Let Them Theory	Shortlisted	
2025	Arundhati Roy	Mother Mary Comes to Me	Shortlisted	
2025	Tim Siadatan	Padella	Shortlisted	
2025	Uketsu	Strange Pictures by	Shortlisted	

== See also ==
- Waterstones Children's Book Prize
- Waterstones Debut Fiction Prize
- Waterstones Children's Laureate
- Waterstones 11
- Guardian First Book Award
