= The Dragon Republic =

2019 fantasy novel by R. F. Kuang

- First edition
- Author: R. F. Kuang
- Audio read by: Emily Woo Zeller
- Cover artist: Jung Shan Chang
- Language: English
- Series: Poppy War trilogy
- Release number: 2
- Genre: Grimdark, High fantasy
- Publisher: Harper Voyager
- Publication date: August 6, 2019
- Publication place: United States
- Media type: Print, digital
- Pages: 672
- ISBN: 978-0-06-266263-7 (hardback)
- OCLC: 1110689865
- Preceded by: The Poppy War
- Followed by: The Burning God

The Dragon Republic is a grimdark fantasy novel written by R. F. Kuang and published by Harper Voyager, an imprint of HarperCollins. The book was published on August 6, 2019, as a sequel to The Poppy War.

== Background ==
The novel follows the events of The Poppy War, which depicted the Federation of Mugen's invasion of Rin's homeland, Nikan. The sequel follows Rin as she struggles with opium addiction and seeks to kill the Empress. However, Rin now has the power of the Phoenix and is the commander of the Cike. Rin is captured by Yin Vaisra, the Dragon Warlord, who intends to conquer Nikan.Like its predecessor, the novel draws on 20th-century Chinese history; the South China Morning Post described Rin as a barely disguised analogue of Mao Zedong.

== Reception ==
James Kidd of the South China Morning Post gave the novel four out of five stars, describing it as a blend of 20th-century Chinese history and Game of Thrones–style epic fantasy. Kristi Chadwick of Library Journal called it a stunning sequel. Lucy Lockley of Booklist praised its depiction of the psychological and material toll of war. Wired included it in its list of must-read books of summer 2019. Writing for NPR, Kalyani Saxena described it as possibly her favorite fantasy novel. Paste named it one of the best novels of 2019. In 2020, Time included it in its list of the 100 best fantasy books of all time. Publishers Weekly described it as an enthralling military fantasy.

=== Awards ===
Award	Year	Category	Result	Ref.
Ignyte Awards	2020	Adult Novel	Finalist	
Goodreads Choice Awards	2019	Best Fantasy	Nominated	

== Translations ==
The Dragon Republic has been translated into a number of languages, in addition to its original English.

Language	Title	Publication date	Publisher	Translator	ISBN	Ref.
German	Im Zeichen der Mohnblume – Die Kaiserin	2020	Blanvalet	Michaela Link	978-3-73-416231-2	
Italian	La repubblica del drago	2021	Mondadori	S. Hakobyan	978-8-80-473926-5	
Polish	Republika Smoka	2020	Fabryka Słów	Grzegorz Komerski	978-8-37-964592-3	
Ukrainian	Республіка Дракона	2021	Zhorzh	Hanna Lytvynenko	978-617-8023-09-6	
Russian	Республика Дракон	2020	Fanzon	Natalia Rokachevskaya	978-5-04-110400-9	

== Adaptation ==
The Poppy War Series was optioned for a television adaptation by Starlight Media and SA Inc. in December 2020, with Allen Fischer packaging the project.
