= Felicity Wishes =

Children's book series

Felicity Wishes is a British children's book series created and privately owned by Emma Thomson. It was first published on greeting cards for adults produced by Danilo, Nightwear for adults by La Senza and Ragdolls for children & adults by Golden Bear. The brand then went on to become a globally published children's book series totalling 101 books in 22 languages which includes activity books, picture books, first read fiction and annuals. The popularity of the books and merchandise led to the launch of a Felicity Wishes magazine and hundreds of other products. There are 56 parts of the Felicity Wishes magazine, in which every issue highlights a different aspirational fairy-role including Carpenter, Film Maker, Shop Keeper, Eco-worker, Gardener, Chef, Architect & Journalist. Some of the stories were co-authored by Helen Bailey.

The series is about a fairy called Felicity and her friends Holly, Polly, Daisy and Winnie. Felicity lives in a fictional town called Little Blossoming, which is set in Fairy World, and is the same as the human world with several key exceptions: there is no age, birth or death (fairies live forever), no men, no meat-eating, no money, no evil and no crime. Most of the books are set pre-graduation where Felicity goes to the School of Nine Wishes to learn and she eats cake and drinks tea with her friends at Sparkles Cafe. She has also travelled all over Fairy World. In these books Felicity and her friends both have a single pair of wings, because they still go to school; fairies who have graduated get double wings. Felicity has a constant companion, a little blue bird called Bertie Dishes, the only male character in the whole book series.

== Characters ==
- Felicity is the main character of the books. She is a fairy who befriends many people wherever she goes. She is blonde and her favourite colour is pink. She always wears a lot of pink and her signature is her pink and white stripy tights. In Spooky Sleepover, the 13th book, it is seen that Felicity lacks the ability to cook and can get very clumsy. Felicity wants to be a Friendship Fairy when she graduates.
- Holly is one of Felicity's friends. She loves fashion and hairstyles and, lacking a natural talent, has to learn many things. In Party Pickle, the 10th book, it is revealed that Holly's favourite colour is red. Her hair is long, straight and chestnut brown. Holly wants to be a Christmas Fairy when she is older. Holly is quite dramatic and can sometimes be a bit of a show-off. Also, she loves to eat cakes with her friends.
- Polly is Felicity's friend. She is intelligent and is good at almost anything, but she is never self-satisfied. Polly is the smartest of Felicity's friends; she pays more attention to teachers and gets all of her work answers correct. Polly loves teeth, so she wants to be a Tooth Fairy when she is older. Polly is very modest, helpful and kind and has frizzy hair.
- Daisy is another one of Felicity's friends. Daisy has a floral interest and does not like going out on sunny days much because she wants to water her flowers. Daisy loves garden centres so she can see flowers. Daisy daydreams quite a lot, even at school. In one of the magazines, it said that Daisy's favourite colour is green. When Daisy graduates with double wings, she would like to be a Blossom Fairy. Daisy is helpful and kind and seems to be quite shy.
- Winnie was introduced in 2008. She wants to become an Adventure Fairy. Winnie is multiracial, and is very adventurous, brave and curious about the world. She has been all over the Fairy World.

== Criticism ==
In 2007, writing in the UK newspaper The Independent, Katy Guest raised concerns about the message conveyed to young girls by the line of products associated with the Felicity character: "A current advert for a new magazine from the fairy princess Felicity Wishes encourages little girls to dream about their future lives. "Every issue I try out a new job, from cake-maker to nurse, to popstar!" Felicity squeals. "Part 1 comes with a cute Felicity Wishes doll and with every issue, there's a sparkly new outfit to dress her in!" Felicity does not come with an astronaut's costume or a train driver's hat and seems to want little girls to grow up to be homemakers and pop tarts and use too many exclamation marks".

The blog The Alpha Parent iterated similar concerns in a 2012 post analyzing the magazine's series of "dream jobs": "The magazine is an example of how girls are socialised to be *prepared* to accept their place in the sexual division of labour. That is, to aspire to jobs which are less-skilled, lower-paid, and often part-time".
