= The Poppy War =

2018 fantasy novel by R. F. Kuang

- First edition
- Author: R. F. Kuang
- Audio read by: Emily Woo Zeller
- Cover artist: Jung Shan Chang
- Language: English
- Series: Poppy War trilogy
- Release number: 1
- Genre: Grimdark; high fantasy
- Publisher: Harper Voyager
- Publication date: May 1, 2018
- Publication place: United States
- Media type: Print; digital
- Pages: 544
- Awards: Compton Crook Award (2019); Crawford Award (2019)
- ISBN: 978-0062662569 (hardback)
- Followed by: The Dragon Republic

The Poppy War is a 2018 high fantasy novel by American author R. F. Kuang, published by Harper Voyager. A grimdark fantasy, the book's plot draws on politics from mid-20th-century China, with the conflict in the novel inspired by the Second Sino-Japanese War, and an atmosphere evocative of the Song dynasty. A sequel, The Dragon Republic, was released in August 2019, and a third book, The Burning God, was released November 2020.

Harper Voyager's editorial director David Pomerico acquired the novel after a heated auction on Kuang's 20th birthday.

== Plot ==
Fang Runin ("Rin") is a war orphan in the Nikara Empire whose foster parents employ her in their opium smuggling. To escape an arranged marriage, she sets her sights on passing the Keju, the empire-wide test to find the most talented candidates for admittance to their Academies. Shocking everyone, she places first in her province, which sends her north to Sinegard, the imperial capital and home of the military academy.

Despite being mocked for being a poor southerner by her peers, Rin excels in her studies. She befriends Chen Kitay, the son of a minister, and strikes up a rivalry with Yin Nezha, the son of one of the twelve regional warlords. She also looks up to the school's star student, Altan Trengsin, who is from the island of Speer. Speerly soldiers served the empire by wielding shamanic fire powers from their god, the Phoenix, until they were massacred by the Federation of Mugen in the previous war. Rin attracts the attention of eccentric Master Jiang, who helps her explore her talent for shamanism. She wins the first year tournament over Nezha, is enthralled by the appearance of the empress Su Daji at a festival, and is taught by Jiang how to access the magic of the gods via meditation and psychoactive drugs.

War looms over the horizon, and as Rin enters her third year, the Federation of Mugen invades the country of Nikan and seeks to capture Sinegard. Master Jiang disappears after using shamanistic powers to summon monsters to bring down the gate that Rin and Nezha were defending on the Mugenese army.

In the aftermath of the invasion, Rin faints after using the power of the Phoenix to immolate an enemy general who impaled Nezha, which prompts a Mugenese retreat. Rin learns she is a Speerly, and to avoid the warlords fighting over her, she is selected to join the Cike, a special military unit of young, mostly-shaman, imperial assassins now led by Altan.

The Cike are sent to the southern port city of Kurdalain, where despite a successful strike on Mugenese reinforcements, Rin struggles to access the Phoenix. There, she reunites with Nezha who apologises to her for his behavior towards her in Sinegard, and they kill one of the monsters released by Jiang. After prolonged street fighting, Altan becomes disillusioned and Nezha is lost during a Mugenese chemical attack. The Cike realize that the Kurdalain siege is a feint and travel to the wartime capital of Golyn Niis to find the city destroyed and its inhabitants massacred by the Mugenese. Sifting through the wreckage, they discover Kitay, who informs them that the empress had fled the city before the massacre, and Venka, Rin's former roommate, who was raped and begs Rin to avenge her.

Altan decides that the only way to win the war is to unleash former members of the Cike who are entombed alive after going mad in a mountain prison where their powers are suppressed. Having gotten approval from the empress, Altan sets off with Rin. There, they find Jiang who had imprisoned himself after losing control of his power. He refuses to help them and accuses Altan of only wanting revenge for his people. After releasing Feylen, a former Cike with wind powers, nearly results in Altan's death, the pair decide to leave but are captured by a Mugenese ambush.

Rin and Altan are taken to a Mugenese science facility and experimented on with opium. They learn that the empress had betrayed their mission for her own life, and had sold out Nikan. The opium helps Rin awaken her power and Altan sacrifices himself as a diversion for Rin to escape the mainland to head to the island of Speer. There she finds the Phoenix's temple, channels the god's unlimited fire, and destroys the primary island of the Mugenese homeland.

In the epilogue, Rin awakens on a ship crewed by the Cike and Kitay, who is horrified by what she has done. She learns that Altan named her Cike commander and vows to use her newfound powers to take revenge on the empress for her treachery.

== Inspiration ==
Kuang wrote The Poppy War while teaching debate in China. She said, "I chose to write a fantasy reinterpretation of China's twentieth century, because that was the kind of story I wasn't finding on bookshelves". She later graduated with a degree in Chinese history from Georgetown University a few days after the book's release; her studies in Chinese military strategy and collective trauma inspired her to write the novel, as well as questions about the psychology of Mao Zedong (or military leaders, more generally). She was quoted asking: "how do you go from the roots that Mao and Rin had, to holding unimaginable power and causing so much suffering with it? How do you mentally justify that to yourself?"

The novel draws from the history of domestic warfare in China: the Opium Wars inspired the book's motifs of substance use, organized crime, and colonialism, whereas the Second Sino-Japanese War, particularly the horrors of the Nanjing Massacre, inspired the conflict between the Nikara Empire and the Federation of Mugen.

Kuang has cited Avatar: The Last Airbender as a major influence on her work; particularly the character of Azula, and the relationship between Zuko and Katara. Ender's Game, Naruto, Bleach, Dragon Age, Mass Effect, The Grace of Kings, and Game of Thrones were other influences.

== Reception ==
The Poppy War was a 2018 Nebula Award nominee, and was named one of the best books of the year by several publications and organizations, including The Washington Post, Time, The Guardian, Paste, Vulture, Bustle, and The Verge. It has received endorsements from authors Fonda Lee, Julie C. Dao, and Kameron Hurley. It was also nominated for the World Fantasy Award for Best Novel.

Publishers Weekly called the book "a strong and dramatic launch to Kuang's career," while Michael Nam, writing in New York Daily News, referred to The Poppy War as an ambitious start to a trilogy. He further described the book as "a dark and fatalistic tale of warfare."

While the book's worldbuilding has been lauded, its plot and development have garnered more critical reviews. In a review in Locus, Lila Garrott points out: "It's well executed for what it does, but it's a shame that Kuang chose to downplay the more original elements in favor of material that has been seen before. All of the novel's ambition seems to have gone into the worldbuilding and magic system and then not been allowed to affect the actual plot." In his Wired commentary on fantasy tropes, Jason Kehe agreed that the material did not represent a "revolution" in the genre, but said that "Kuang manages to pierce through."

== Awards ==
Year	Award	Category	Result	Ref.
2018	BookNest Fantasy Award	Debut Novel	Finalist	
2018	Goodreads Choice Awards	Debut Author	Nominated	
2018	Goodreads Choice Awards	Fantasy	Nominated	
2018	Kitschies	Golden Tentacle (Debut Novel)	Finalist	
2018	Nebula Award	Novel	Finalist	
2019	British Fantasy Award	Sydney J. Bounds Award	Nominated	
2019	Compton Crook Award	—	Won	
2019	Crawford Award	—	Won	
2019	Locus Award	First Novel	Finalist	
2019	RUSA CODES Reading List	Fantasy	Shortlisted	
2019	World Fantasy Award	Novel	Finalist	

== Translations ==
As of November 2024, The Poppy War has been translated into 15 languages: Bulgarian, Czech, French, German, Hungarian, Indonesian, Italian, Polish, Brazilian Portuguese, Romanian, Russian, Serbian, Spanish, Turkish, and Ukrainian.

== Television adaptation ==
In December 2020, the television adaptation rights to the books were bought by Starlight Media, to be a coproduction with SA Inc. The TV adaptation has been stuck in development hell since 2020.
