= Helen Bailey =

British author (1964–2016)

- Born: Helen Elizabeth Bailey; 22 August 1964; Ponteland, Northumberland, England
- Died: c. 11 April 2016 (aged 51); Royston, Hertfordshire, England
- Education: Ponteland High School; Thames Polytechnic
- Occupation: Author
- Spouse: John Sinfield (d. 2011)
- Partner: Ian Stewart
- Writing career
- Genres: Young adult fiction Children's fiction
- Notable work: Electra Brown series

Helen Elizabeth Bailey (22 August 1964 – c. 11 April 2016) was a British author who wrote the Electra Brown series of books aimed at a teenage audience.

Bailey was reported missing in April 2016; three months later on 15 July, her remains were found hidden at her home. Her partner, Ian Stewart, was charged with her murder and found guilty in February 2017; he was later found guilty of the murder of his first wife, Diane.

== Life and career ==
Bailey was born in Ponteland near Newcastle upon Tyne, and was brought up there. She later wrote of her experience at Ponteland High School: "Whilst at school I used to sit and stare out of the window, dreaming of anything but lessons, then go home and write pages and pages in my diary of who did what to whom and (usually) why wasn't I part of it."

She gained a degree in physiology at Thames Polytechnic in London, intending to become a forensic scientist, before undertaking postgraduate research in a teaching hospital. She then changed career to work in the media, and worked on licensing and marketing campaigns for characters such as Rugrats and Garfield, and for Nintendo, feature film and cartoon characters. While working as a temporary secretary, she met and, in 1996, married the head of a licensing rights company, John Sinfield. She moved from Clerkenwell to Highgate around the same time.

Bailey wrote five books of "teenage angst" in the Crazy World of Electra Brown series: Life at the Shallow End (2008), Out of my Depth (2008), Swimming Against the Tide (2009), Taking the Plunge (2009), and Falling Hook, Line & Sinker (2010). She was nominated for a "Queen of Teen" award in 2010. In Running in Heels (2011), she featured a new character, Daisy Davenport. Bailey also wrote books for younger children, including the Willow the Woodsprite series and the Topaz series, and co-authored books in the Felicity Wishes series. In all, she had 22 books of short stories, picture books and young-adult fiction published.

In February 2011, her husband John Sinfield drowned while swimming when the couple were on holiday in Barbados. They had been together for 22 years, and married for the last 15. Her first book for adults, When Bad Things Happen in Good Bikinis (2015), was based on her Planet Grief blog which sets out her "journey through grief" after he died. It was described in The Guardian as "a painful and companionable account of coming to terms with life without her husband." The book also noted her subsequent relationship, beginning in October 2011, with widower Ian Stewart, a father of two adult sons. She appeared on television to talk about the grieving process, and in October 2015, she discussed her experiences and the book on BBC Radio 4's Woman's Hour.

== Disappearance and death ==
Bailey was reported missing from her home in Royston, Hertfordshire, by her partner Ian Stewart, after last being seen out walking her dog on 11 April 2016. He claimed that a note was found, saying she was going to stay at the family holiday home in Broadstairs, but it was later established that she had not been there. Her brother and mother described her disappearance as out of character, and the police described it as "perplexing".

On 11 July, police reported that they had arrested a 55-year-old Royston man, and questioned him on suspicion of murder and disposing of a body. He was initially released on bail, but on 15 July police reported that human remains, and those of Bailey's dog, had been found in a hidden second septic tank at her house, Hartwell Lodge, in Royston. Police confirmed that the remains found were those of Bailey. Ian Stewart was charged on 16 July with murder, perverting the course of justice and preventing a lawful burial. He was remanded in custody and appeared at St Albans Crown Court on 19 July. On 12 October he pleaded not guilty, with his trial set for January 2017.

=== Murder trial ===
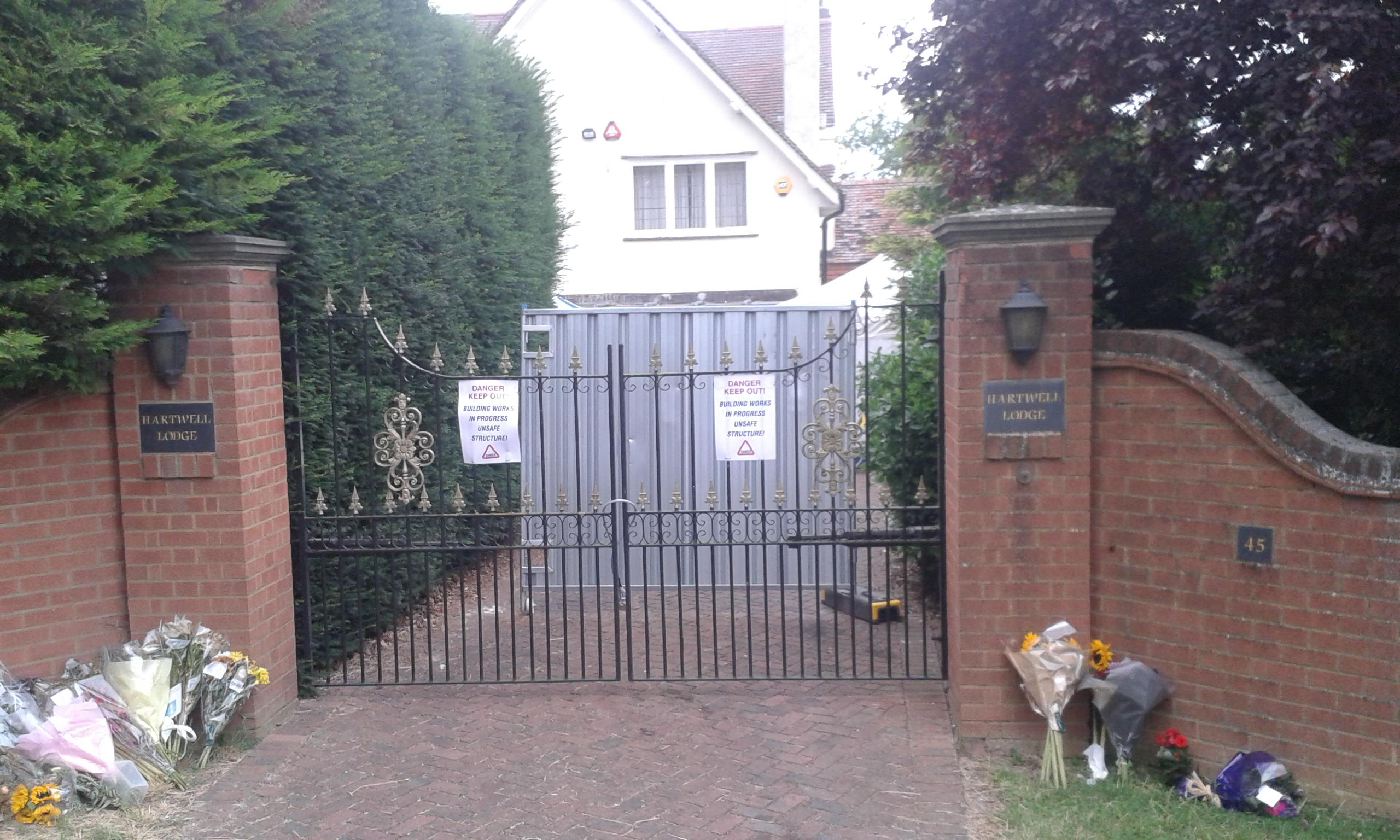
Residence of Helen Bailey, 23 July 2016

At the trial in January 2017, the prosecution alleged Stewart had secretly drugged Bailey with zopiclone sleeping pills for several months before suffocating her. It was later alleged that she may still have been alive when dumped in the cesspit. During the trial, the prosecution claimed that Stewart had inadvertently connected Bailey's mobile phone to the WiFi router in the couple's holiday home in Kent by visiting it the day after reporting her missing, an event which prosecutor Stuart Trimmer called 'very significant'.

The jury was later told by Bailey's brother that during his only visit to her home in Royston she had joked about the cesspit in the garage being a "good place to hide a body", and that the remark had been made in "full earshot" of Stewart. The members of the jury subsequently visited the site where her body had been discovered. They also heard that it was alleged by the prosecution that Stewart had twice attempted to use power of attorney to sell a flat owned by Bailey; these attempts included one on the afternoon of the day on which she went missing, when he told the solicitor dealing with the sale that Bailey was too unwell to attend in person. The jury heard that on the day she vanished Stewart increased a standing order to transfer money from Bailey's bank account to their joint account from £400 to £4,000 per month. The jury learned Stewart was the main beneficiary of Bailey's £3.4 million estate, and would also benefit from a large life insurance policy.

The jury was played a recording of Stewart's telephone call to the police in which he reported Bailey missing; when asked to describe her he could not recall the colour of her eyes, had to look up both her mobile phone number and date of birth, and was unable to give the address of their holiday home in Kent.

Helen's mother Eileen Bailey testified that Helen had been concerned that she was sleeping excessively, and about her state of mind. The prosecution stated that traces of anti-insomnia medication had been found in Bailey's body. In the weeks prior to her death, Bailey had made internet searches for "I'm so tired, falling asleep at work" and "falling asleep in the afternoon".

Giving evidence in his defence, Stewart claimed that Bailey and her dog had been kidnapped on 11 April 2016 by two men called Nick and Joe, saying that he had not told the police about this "to keep Helen safe" and that the kidnappers had demanded a ransom of £500,000. He said that he had spoken to her for the last time on a mobile phone belonging to one of the men on 15 April. He was subsequently presented in court with two men who the prosecution alleged he had based the descriptions of the kidnappers on: Nick Cook, Stewart's next-door neighbour, and Joe Cippullo, whom he knew from his former home in Bassingbourn. Stewart admitted to knowing both men, but denied that they matched the descriptions of the kidnappers which he had given to the police, saying "they don't compare at all".

The jury heard of several sightings of Bailey after the time at which the prosecution alleged that the murder had taken place. One of Bailey's neighbours gave evidence that she had seen the author walking her dachshund Boris "between 15:40 and 15:50" on the day of her disappearance. Two other neighbours said they had seen her walking her dog that day between about 13:20 and 14:20. A further witness claimed to have seen Bailey in Broadstairs after her alleged murder, but admitted under cross-examination that he had not thought about the sighting until a journalist from The Sun had interviewed him; he accepted that the sighting could have been in March, before Bailey was reported missing.

In his closing statement, prosecutor Stuart Trimmer QC told the jury that Stewart's version of events was "quite absurd" and that the accused had "grossly deceived" Bailey, saying: "It is perfectly plain she was completely overwhelmed by what some people might call 'love bombing'... it is a matter of common sense and knowledge that someone shortly bereaved might not have the logical equipment to see she was being deceived." In response, Simon Russell Flint, the barrister acting for Stewart, dismissed the prosecution's "highly speculative theories", and asked, "What possible motive could he have?"

On 22 February 2017, the jury found Stewart guilty of Bailey's murder. At St Albans Crown Court the following day, Judge Andrew Bright sentenced Stewart to life imprisonment with a minimum term of 34 years. Stewart was not in court to hear his sentence.

The detective who led the murder inquiry called Stewart a "greedy, wicked narcissist". Members of Stewart's former bowls club recalled how he was "obsessed with money" and extremely parsimonious: he accounted for every penny he spent or was owed, he caused a scene at a bowls match when asked to pay for a cup of tea as he argued that it should have been covered in his membership fee, he refused to chip in a few pounds for unforeseen repairs to the bowling green for the same reason, and he refused to participate in whip-rounds for colleagues' birthdays.

=== Aftermath ===
Stewart was the subject of the first episode of the true crime drama What The Killer Did Next, broadcast in February 2019 and presented by Philip Glenister.

=== Death of Stewart's wife (2010) ===
Following Stewart's conviction, the police began to re-examine the death of his first wife, Diane, in 2010. On 21 August 2018 he was arrested and questioned on suspicion of her murder. Subsequently charged with his wife's murder, Stewart appeared at St Albans Crown Court on 6 July 2020. He was remanded in custody until a plea hearing scheduled for 21 September 2020. In November 2021, Stewart pleaded not guilty to the charge.

On 9 February 2022, Ian Stewart was found guilty of Diane Stewart's murder. He was sentenced to life imprisonment with a whole life order, meaning that he would have served the sentence without the possibility of parole. However, Stewart appealed his sentence, which was reduced to a 35-year minimum term by the Court of Appeal on 29 July.

== See also ==
- List of solved missing person cases (post-2000)
- List of prisoners with whole life orders
