= Tom de Freston =

Visual artist and writer

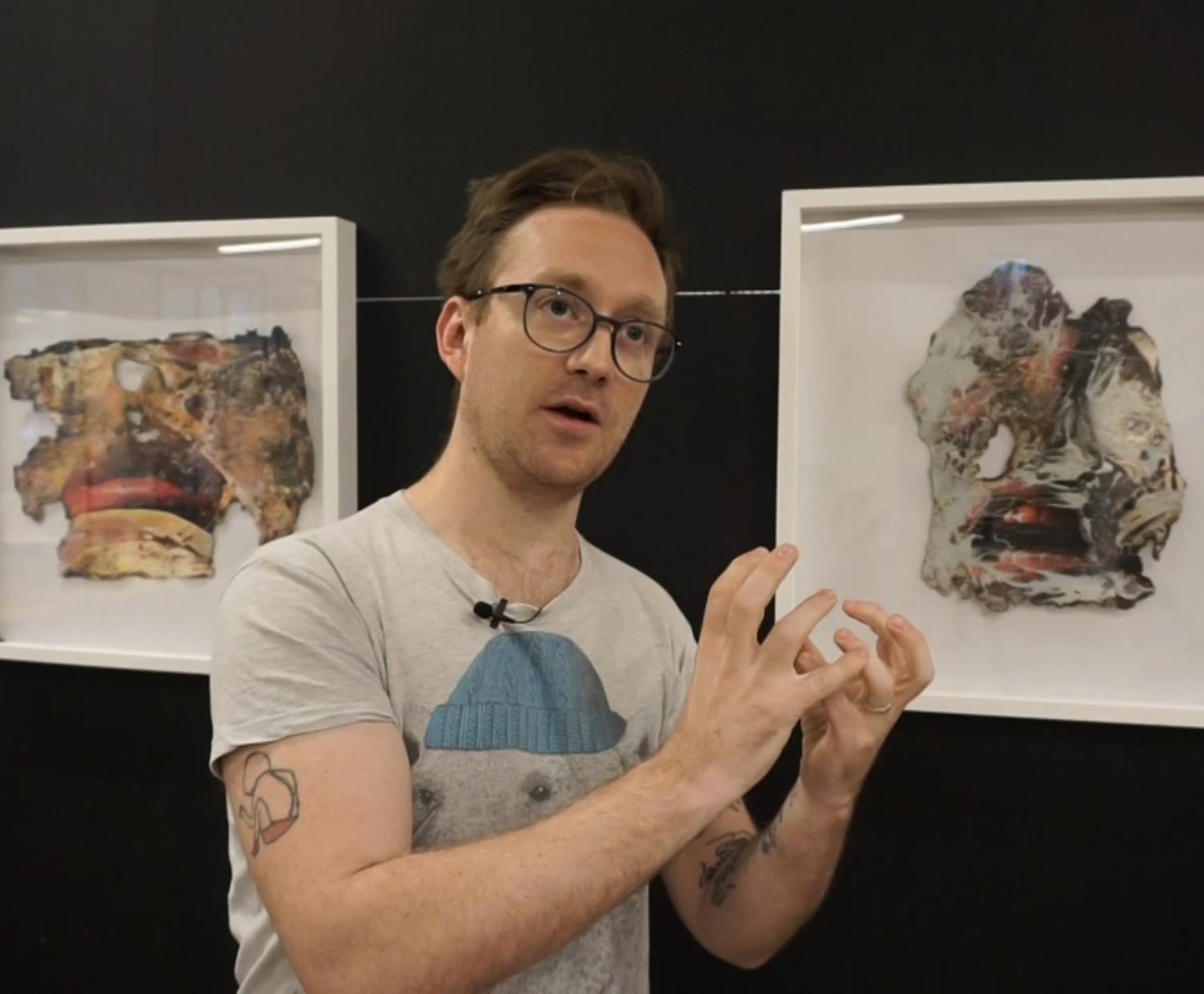
- de Freston in 2019
- Born: 23 May 1983 (age 43)
- Known for: Mixed media; painting; performance art
- Spouse: Kiran Millwood Hargrave
- Children: 1

Tom de Freston (born 23 May 1983, London) is a visual artist and writer based in Oxford. His work is known for his focus on images of humanity, despair, that ‘convey our most haunted fears about a world struggling for survival’ (Richard Cork). His practice is dedicated to the construction of multimedia worlds, combining paintings, film, writing and performance into immersive visceral narratives.

== Career ==
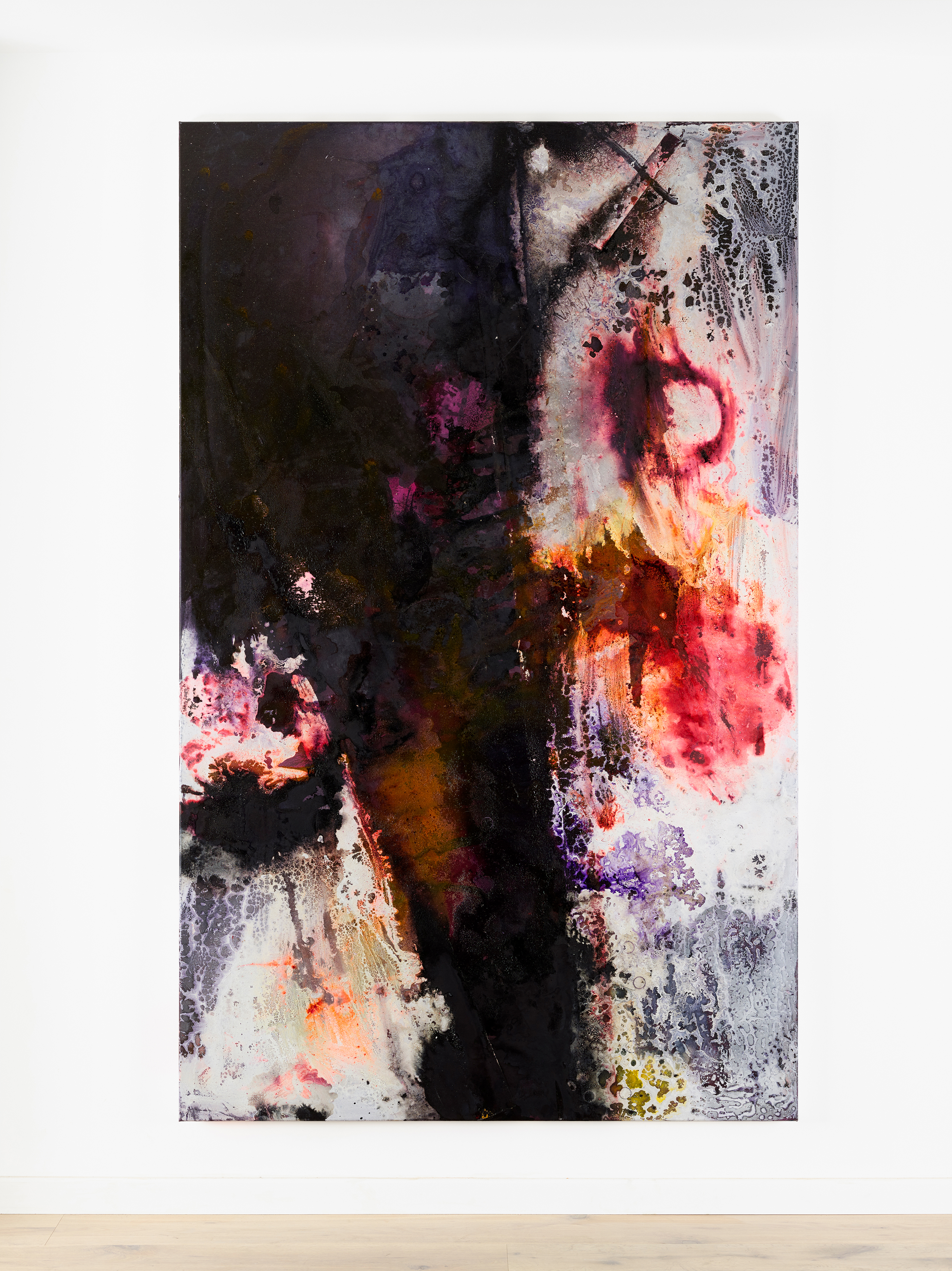
Wound by Tom de Freston (2021), Mixed media on canvas, 2x1.25M.

De Freston graduated from Cambridge University in 2007. His painterly, literary and stage projects are often collaborative and interdisciplinary, and frequently draw on literary, art historical, personal, and social sources and themes. Regular collaborators include his wife the writer Kiran Millwood Hargrave, the film maker Mark Jones (Unmarked Films), the writer and academic Professor Simon Palfrey and the academic Dr. Pablo de Orellana. Past and ongoing collaborative projects include I Saw This, Demons Land, Truthtellers, Poor Tom, Orpheus and Eurydice and Scavengers.

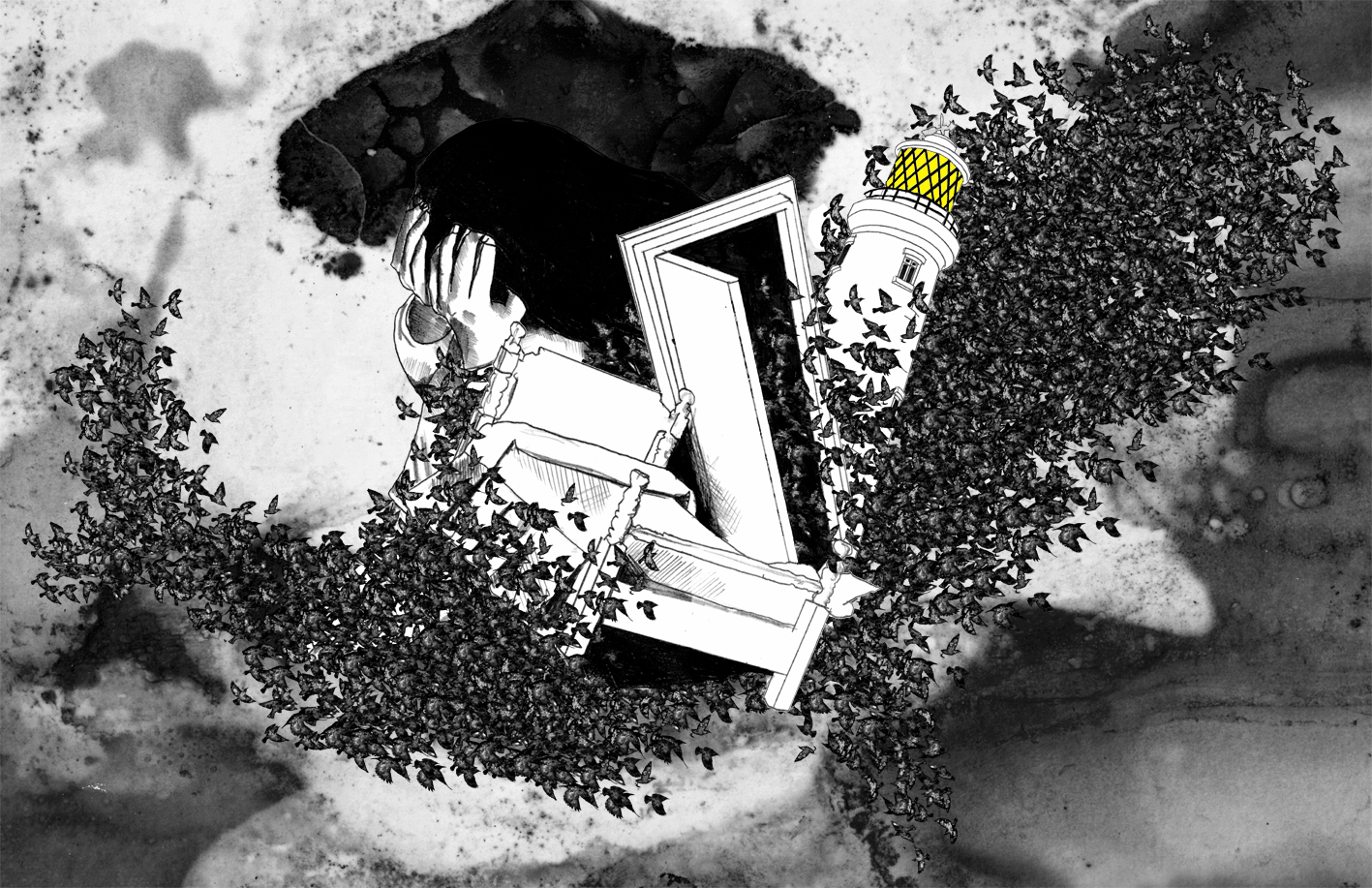
Artwork by Tom de Freston from Julia and the Shark, published in 2021 by Hachette Childrens Group

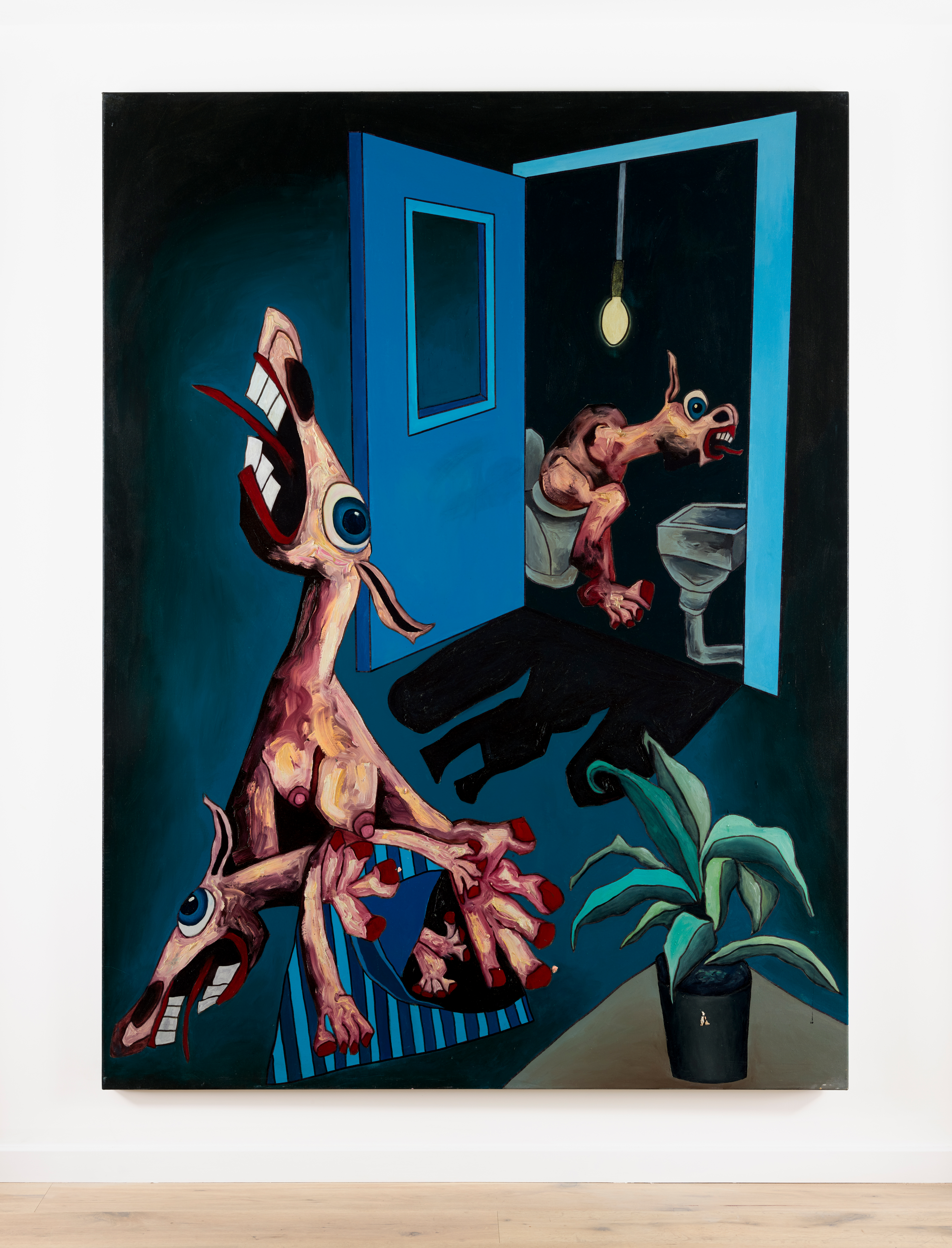
Mother Wept, by Tom de Freston (2014), Oil on canvas, 2x1.5M.

He started exhibiting professionally in 2008 and to date has had twenty-six solo shows. He was represented by Breese Little Gallery (London) from 2012 to 2016. He is currently represented by No20 arts, London. His debut solo show with No20 Arts was From Darkness, from March to July 2022. A monograph on de Freston’s work by the writer and academic Dr. Stephen Kenyon Owen is forthcoming with Gatehouse Press, 2024.

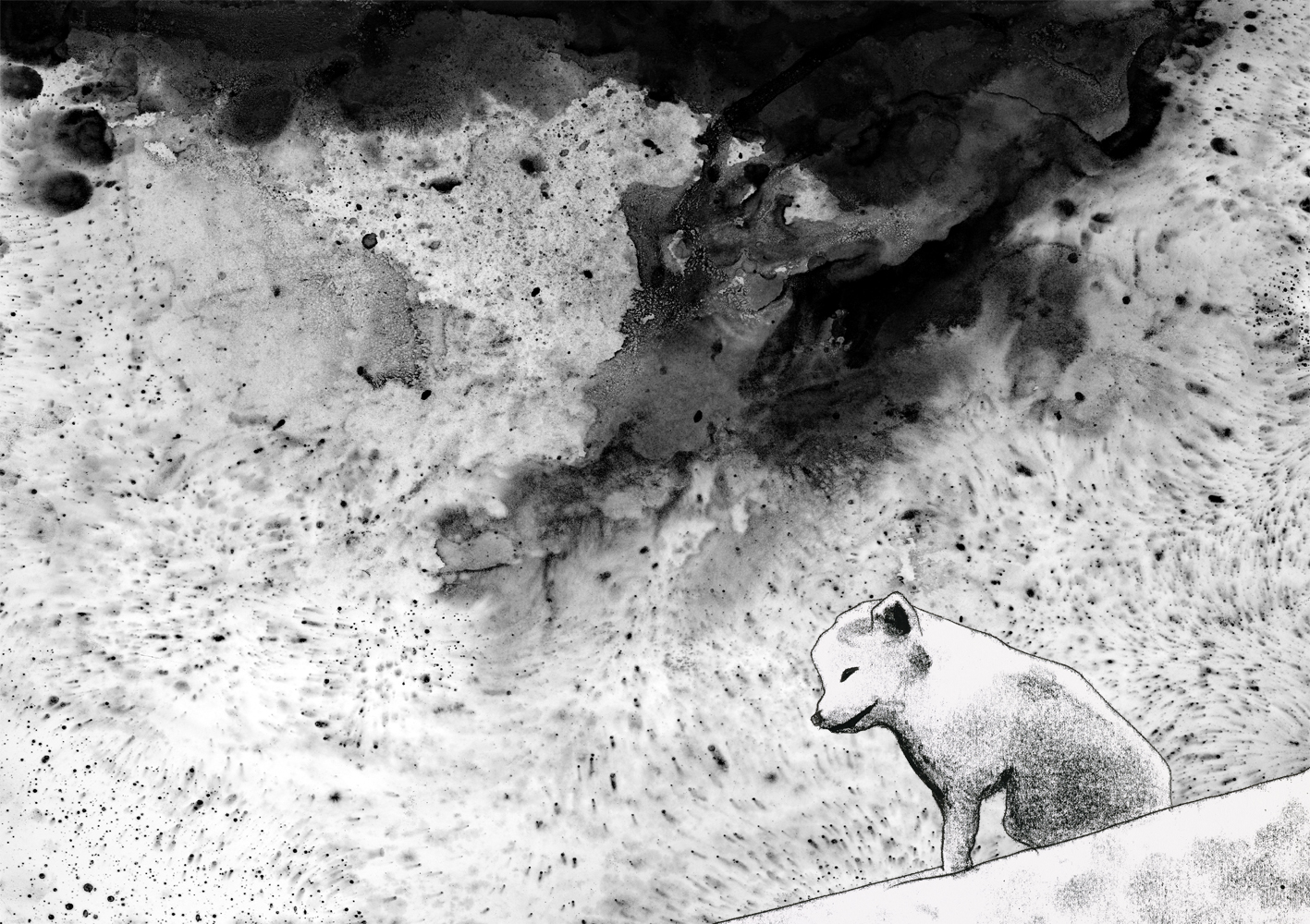
Artwork by Tom de Freston from Leila and the Blue Fox, published in September 2022 by Hachette Childrens Group

His writing is represented by the literary agent Harriet Moore at David Higham Associates. His debut work of narrative non-fiction, Wreck was published by Granta in 2022. His second narrative non-fiction book is forthcoming with Granta in March 2024.

As of January 2026 his illustration work is represented by Paul Black at The Bright Agency. Julia and the Shark (2021, Hachette) in collaboration with his wife, Kiran Millwood Hargrave, was shortlisted for Waterstones Book of the Year and the Wainwright Prize for Children's Writing on Nature and Conservation. It won the inaugural Waterstones Children’s Gift of the year. In September 2022 their next collaboration, Leila and the Blue Fox will be published (Hachette).

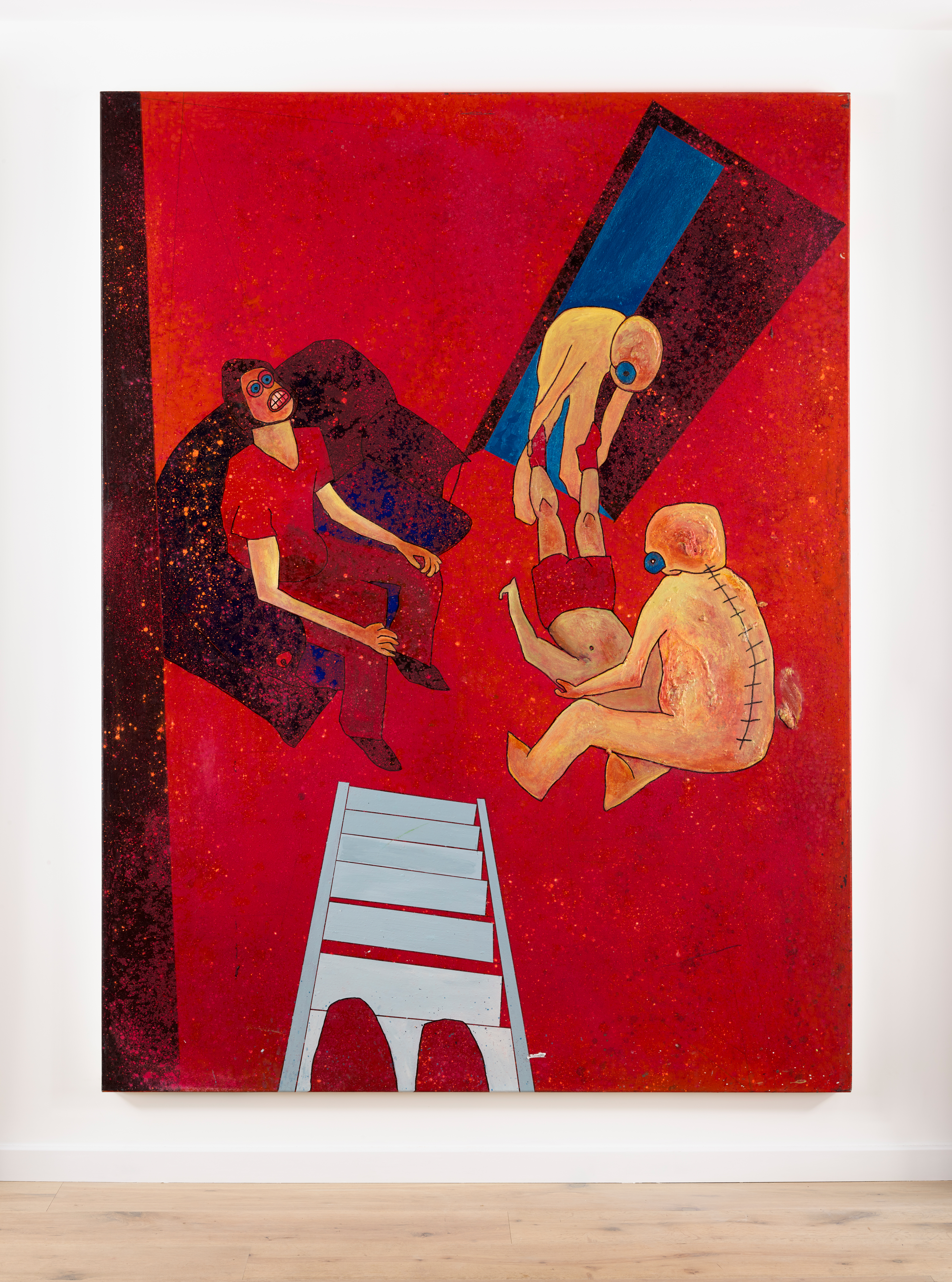
Dead Son, by Tom de Freston (2011), Oil on canvas, 2x1.4M.

Previous publications include various collaborative books. Orpheus and Eurydice, a graphic poetic novel in collaboration with his wife, Kiran Millwood Hargrave (Bloomsbury Academic). Poor Tom, a collaboration with the academic and writer Professor Simon Palfrey in conjunction with the exhibition Shakespeare’s Dead at the Bodleian Library, Oxford University. Charnel House, a poetic graphic novel in collaboration with 37 contemporary poets and writers (Bridgedoor Press), which won best anthology at the Saboteur Awards. House of the Deaf Man, a collaboration with the poet Andrea Porter (Gatehouse Press). A Fools World, a poetic visual pack of Tarot Cards with poet Helen Ivory (Gatehouse Press) which won best collaboration at the Saboteur Awards. Scavengers, poems and paintings in response to the plays of Shakespeare in collaboration with Kiran Millwood Hargrave (Cambridge University). Ekphrasis, poems in response to de Freston’s painting. Exhibition catalogues include, From Darkness (No 20 Arts), Demons Land (National Trust), On Falling (Breese Little), Reflections (Christ’s College, Cambridge), Deposition (Green Pebble).

Since 2016 he has been the artistic director of Medicine Unboxed. From 2016-17 he was the inaugural Creative Fellow at Birmingham University. In 2014 he held the Aldeburgh Lookout Tower residency as part of the Aldeburgh Poetry Festival. From 2013-2015 he was Artist in Residence from Medicine Unboxed. In 2012 he represented UK at World Event Young Artists 2012, Nottingham. In 2012 he was Artist in Residence, The Expansionists in Whitstable with Kiran Millwood Hargrave. In 2012 he held the Hatley Artist in Residence at the Centre for Recent Drawing (C4RD). From 2010-2011 he was a Leverhulme Artist in Residence, Cambridge University. From 2009 to 2011 he was Artist in Residence at The Leys in Cambridge. From 2008 to September 2009 he was the Levy Plumb Visual Arts Residency, Christ’s College Cambridge.

Two essays on his work were included in Figuring out figurative art (Routledge). Essays on his work have included pieces by Sir Nicholas Serota, Sir Trevor Nunn, Christiana Spens, Dr. Pablo de Orellana, Dr. Stephen Kenyon Owen, Chloe Ashby, Dr. James Cahill, Professor Lydia Goer, Dr. Sam Rose, Dr. Damien Freeman, Dr. Rye Holmboe, Dr. Christiana Spens, Simon Martin, Sean Troth, Dr. Anna Ferrari, Francesca Goodwin, Natalia Orellana and Richard Cork. Reviews and essays on his work have appeared in the Guardian, Elephant, TANK, Trebuchet and Quietus.

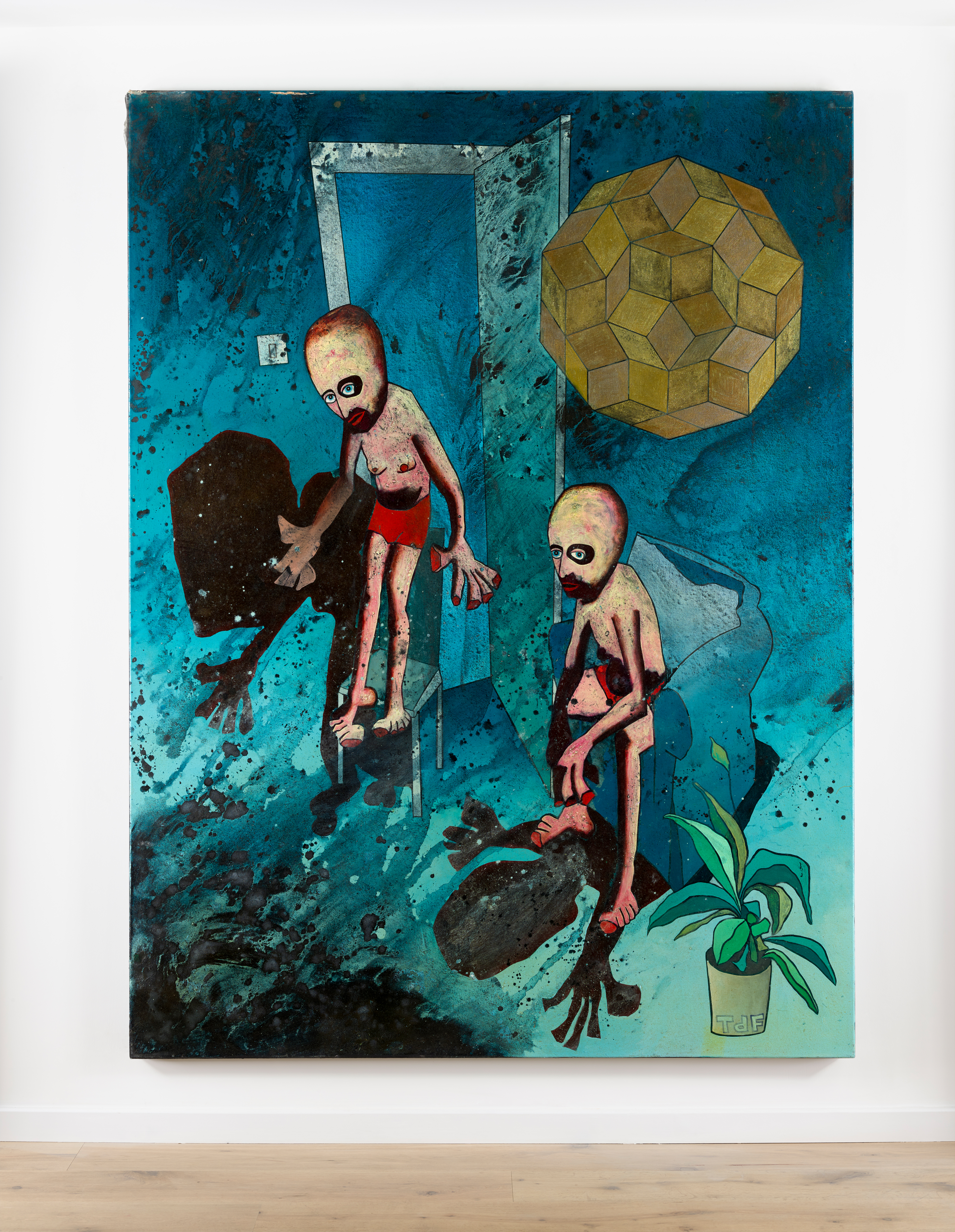
Untitled, by Tom de Freston (2015), Oil on canvas, 2x1.5M.

== Awards ==
- 2021: Waterstones Children’s Gift of the year winner for Julia and the Shark with Kiran Millwood Hargrave
- 2021: Waterstones book of the year shortlist for Julia and the Shark with Kiran Millwood Hargrave
- 2016–2022: National Trust, Oxford University, Queensland University and AHRC follow-on funding for Demons Land project
- 2016: Saboteur Award winner for A Fool’s Worlds
- 2016: Arts Council GFA for OE exhibition and performances
- 2016: Battersea Arts Centre and Guardian Artists Bedrooms commission
- 2016: Arts Council GFA for OE film
- 2015: Saboteur Award winner for The Charnel House
- 2012: Represented UK at World Event Young Artists 2012, Nottingham
  Installation photograph from From Darkness (2022), solo exhibition of Tom de Freston's work at No20 Arts, London.

== Bibliography ==
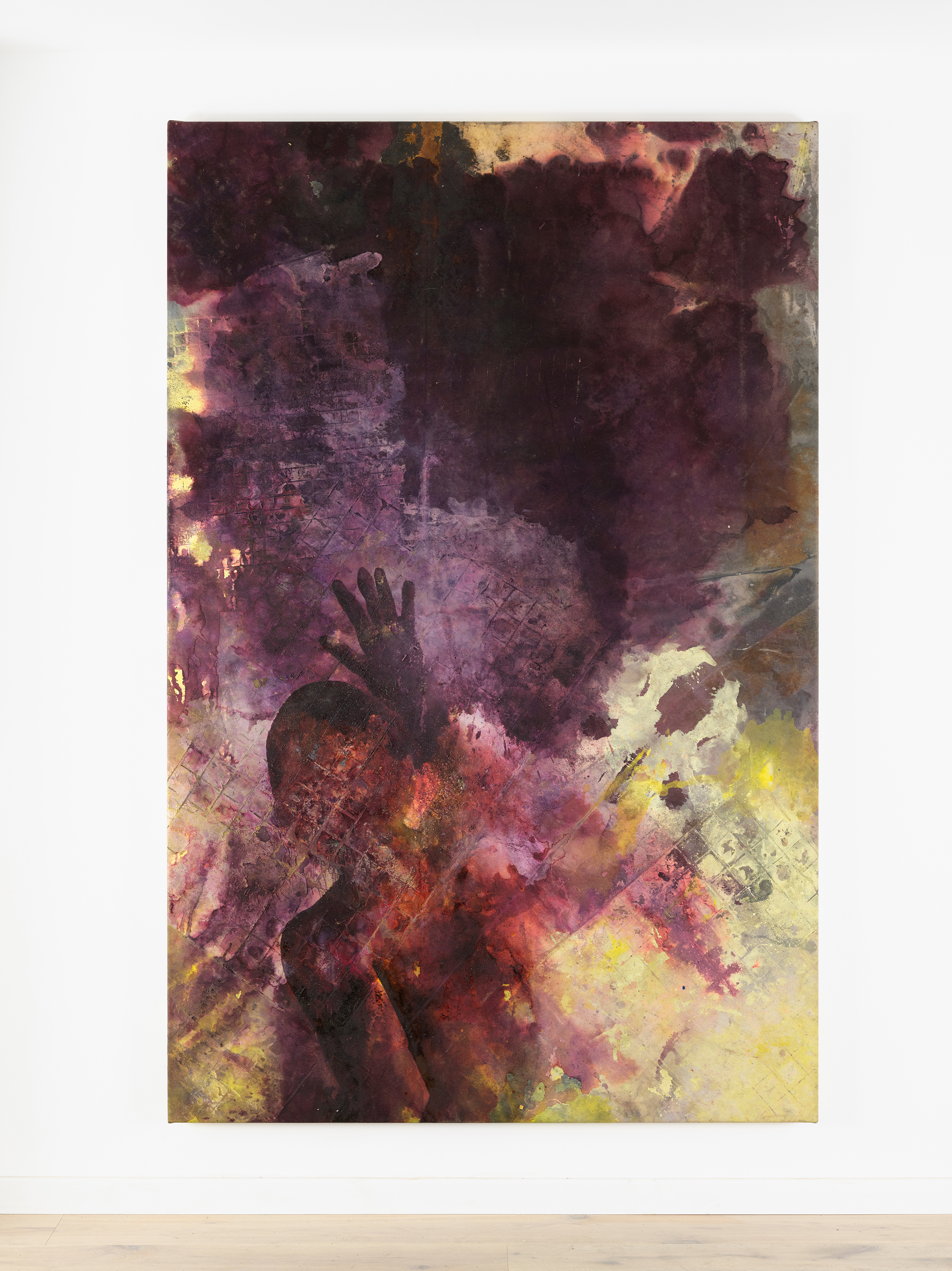
Raft, by Tom de Freston (2021), Mixed media on canvas, 2x1.25M.

- Tom de Freston, STRANGE BODIES (Granta Books, 2024)
- Tom de Freston, I SAW THIS (Anomie Press, 2023)
- Tom de Freston, SKELLIG by David Almond (25th anniversary illustrated edition) (Hachette, 2023)
- Tom de Freston, Wreck (Granta Books, 2022), ISBN 9781783786633
- Kiran Millwood Hargrave, Tom de Freston, Leila and the Blue Fox (Hachette, 2022), ISBN 9781510110274
- Kiran Millwood Hargrave, Tom de Freston, Julia and the Shark (Hachette, 2021), ISBN 9781510107779
- Tom de Freston, OE (Bloomsbury, 2016), ISBN 9781474276788
- Ewan Fernie, Simon Palfrey, Tom de Freston, Macbeth, Macbeth (Bloomsbury, 2016), ISBN 9781474235556
- Tom de Freston, Helen Ivory, Tarot - ‘A Fools World’ (Gatehouse Press, 2015)
- Tom de Freston et al., The Charnel House (Bridgedoor Press, 2014), ISBN 9780993016400, 2015 Saboteur Award Winner
- Tom de Freston, Andrea Porter, House of the Deaf Man (Gatehouse Press, 2012), ISBN 9780956638533
- Kiran Millwood Hargrave, Tom de Freston, Scavengers, with forewords by Sir Trevor Nunn and Dr. Abigail Rokison (BSA Publications, 2011)
- Richard Cork, Rye Holmboe, On Falling (Breese Little, 2011)
- Sir Nicholas Serota, The Right Hon. Rowan Williams, Deposition essays (Green Pebble, 2011)
- Kiran Millwood Hargrave (ed.), Ekphrasis, Fifteen poets in response to the paintings of Tom de Freston (Freewood Publications, 2010)
- Dr. Caroline Vout, Ruth Padel, Reflections essays (Tablo Arts, 2010)
