= Yellowface (novel) =

2023 novel by R. F. Kuang

- Author: R. F. Kuang
- Language: English
- Genre: Fiction
- Published: May 16, 2023
- Publisher: HarperCollins
- Pages: Hardcover: 336 pp. Paperback: 352 pp.
- ISBN: 9780063250833
- OCLC: 1341438278

Yellowface is a 2023 satirical novel written by R. F. Kuang. The book was described as a satire of racial diversity in the publishing industry as well as a metafiction about social media, particularly Twitter. Although Yellowface is written as a stand-alone project, Kuang has not ruled out a possible sequel.

In late 2024, the screen rights options were sold to Lionsgate Television with Karyn Kusama slated to direct and executive produce a potential limited series based upon this novel with Constance Wu, Justine Suzanne Jones, Ben Smith, and Adam Docksey announced as producers.

== Plot ==
The book is structured as a first-person narrative, with the protagonist June Hayward occasionally directly addressing the reader. June is an unsuccessful young white author who is the only witness to the death of her former classmate and casual friend, Athena Liu, a Chinese-American author who is an industry darling. On the night of her death, June steals Athena's unpublished manuscript The Last Front from her apartment, a novel about Chinese laborers in World War I. June decides to re-edit it supposedly as a writing exercise, but after feeling greater ownership of it, she submits it as her original work. She is immediately offered a large advance by the publisher Eden Press. Candice Lee, an editorial assistant, insists on hiring a sensitivity reader for the manuscript, but is brushed off. June defends herself to the reader, claiming that what she did was a kind of "collaboration" and that Athena often stole the life experiences of others as material for her work, including a date rape incident June survived while at Yale (for which she considers The Last Front "reparations").

Having positioned herself as a close friend and confidant of Athena to address perceived similarities between The Last Front and Athena's other work, June publishes the book under the Asian-sounding name "Juniper Song" (her full forename and middle name) and takes author portraits where she appears racially ambiguous. The book becomes an instant bestseller, but controversy surrounds the novel and June is accused of cultural appropriation on Twitter. While attending publicity events, June sees visions of Athena in the audience.

Before and after the book's publication, June attempts to prevent public revelations of her plagiarism. When Athena's mother Patricia decides to donate Athena's notes to a Yale literary archive, June dissuades her from doing so. An anonymous social media user called @AthenaLiusGhost claims that the book was stolen from Athena and starts an online shaming campaign. June surmises that the @AthenaLiusGhost accounts are being operated by Geoffrey Carlino, Athena's ex-boyfriend whose own literary career ended due to personal controversy. They meet, and Geoff asserts that he and Athena discussed the manuscript of The Last Front while they were dating. When he cannot offer evidence beyond hearsay, June leads him to suggest that she buy his silence while secretly recording him with her phone. Threatening to sue him for defamation, she coerces him into shutting down the accounts, quieting public debate over the plagiarism accusations.

Wanting to continue her literary success, June writes a novella Mother Witch that plagiarises a passage from a poem taken from Athena's apartment. However, the poem had been previously read in a workshop by Athena, and June is again accused of plagiarism. After June convinces Eden Press that she accidentally confused the passage for one of her own notes, the publisher insists that she rewrite the opening of Mother Witch and focus on her next book. However, public belief that June plagiarised Athena's work persists, with June facing public confrontations and ostracism within the literary world. She receives support primarily from conservative news outlets and commentators after the controversy becomes a talking point regarding free speech and cancel culture.

During work on her next project, June faces writer's block, believing that she can only write about Chinese themes due to her success with The Last Front. After refusing an offer to do intellectual property work, June is eventually inspired to write a roman à clef account of her theft of the manuscript, partly to sow doubt over the plagiarism accusations and partly to exorcise "Athena's ghost". After Athena's inactive social media accounts begin posting plagiarism accusations and disturbing Photoshopped images of Athena exclusively to June, June's book soon develops into a horror story, and she is haunted by visions of Athena. June confronts Geoff, but he asserts his innocence and claims that Athena used him and their relationship as a source for material.

Convinced that Athena is still alive, June agrees to meet "Athena" at the "Exorcist steps" at the Georgetown campus. After hearing Athena's disembodied voice, June confesses to her theft of The Last Front and offers to make amends. "Athena" reveals herself as Candice, who was fired for leaving a negative online review for The Last Front. Having been effectively blacklisted from the publishing industry, Candice sought revenge by orchestrating the social media posts that led to June's confession, which she secretly records with a camera. Candice refuses June's pleas not to release the recording, telling June that she will use it to write an exposé. June fights Candice for the camera, but falls in the struggle and is hospitalized.

After being discharged, June learns that Candice has made the confession public and has been given multiple offers to write a memoir. Hoping to sow doubt over Candice's claims, June is inspired to write her own account, planning to frame her theft and plagiarism as a hoax designed to expose the publishing industry for pitting female authors against one another, and depict herself as a victim and Candice as a cyberbully.

== Writing and development ==
Kuang began thinking about Yellowface in 2021, amidst conversations regarding diversity and representation in the publishing industry. She wrote the first draft over the course of a few months, taking inspiration from her own experiences as an Asian American author, such as being told her appeal is largely or entirely due to her being a "token" author.

Upon reading parts of the first draft, Kuang's literary agent was at first hesitant about the project and attempted to dissuade Kuang from pursuing it further due to its content being seen as an attack on the publishing industry. At Kuang's insistence, they continued the project; it was ultimately published by HarperCollins.

== Critical reception ==
=== Reviews ===
Kirkus Reviews called the book "a quick, biting critique of the publishing industry" but commented that it sometimes lacked nuance. The Guardian wrote "Kuang delivers a hugely entertaining account of a brazen literary heist." Amal El-Mohtar of The New York Times gave the book a positive but reserved review, calling it "viciously satisfying" but "on-the-nose" and overly blunt. NPR reviewed Yellowface positively, calling it a "well-executed, gripping, fast-paced novel." The Chicago Review of Books wrote "where [Yellowface] shines is Kuang’s darkly witty tone, critiques of publishing and cultural exploitation, and the all-consuming nature of internet personas." The Washington Post gave a critical review of the novel, saying that June's character was inconsistent and lacked depth, while the novel's depictions of the publishing industry were perfunctory and relied too heavily on replicating Twitter arguments in text.

=== Awards and honours ===
In 2023, Libro.fm named Yellowface one of the top 10 audiobooks of the year, and Time included it on their list of the "100 Must-Read Books of 2023". It was also named Amazon's Best Book of the Year.

Year	Award	Category	Result	Ref.
2023	Books Are My Bag Readers' Award	Fiction	Shortlisted	
2023	Foyles Books of the Year	Fiction	Won	
2023	Libby Book Award	Book Club Pick	Won	
2023	Los Angeles Times Book Prize n. Helen Laser	Audiobook	Finalist	
2023	New England Book Award	Fiction	Won	
2023	Waterstones Book of the Year	—	Shortlisted	
2024	American Book Award	—	Won	
2024	Aspen Words Literary Prize	—	Longlisted	
2024	Audie Awards n. Helen Laser	Fiction	Finalist	
2024	British Book Awards	Fiction Book of the Year	Won	
2024	Goldsboro Books Glass Bell Award	—	Longlisted	
2024	Goodreads Choice Awards	Fiction	Won	
2024	Indie Book Awards (UK)	Fiction	Won	
