= Kiran Millwood Hargrave =

British poet, playwright and novelist (born 1990)

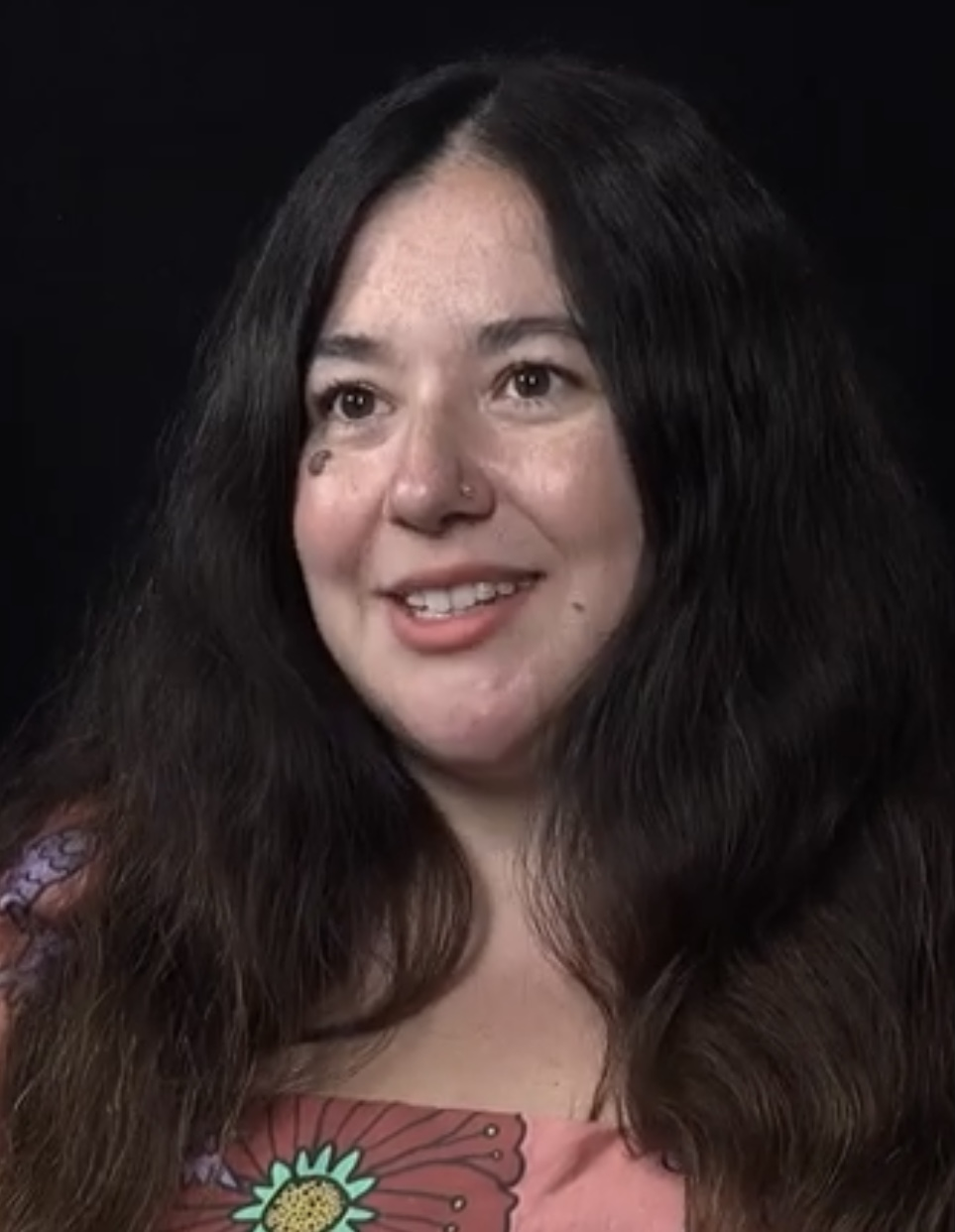
- Hargrave in 2023
- Born: Kiran Ann Millwood Hargrave; 29 March 1990 (age 36); Surrey, England
- Education: Homerton College, Cambridge; University of Oxford
- Years active: 2009–present
- Spouse: Tom de Freston
- Children: 1
- Website: www.kiranmillwoodhargrave.com

Kiran Ann Millwood Hargrave FRSL (born 29 March 1990) is a British poet, playwright and novelist. In 2023, she was elected a Fellow of the Royal Society of Literature.

== Early life ==
Hargrave was born on 29 March 1990 in Surrey. She is of Indian descent on her mother's side. Hargrave graduated with a degree in English and Drama from Homerton College, Cambridge in 2011. She later completed an MSt in Creative Writing at Oxford University in 2014.

== Career ==
She started writing for publication in 2009. In 2014, her debut novel The Girl Of Ink and Stars, aka The Cartographer's Daughter, was bought as part of a six-figure, two-book deal by Knopf Random House (US), and Chicken House Scholastic (rest-of-world). It was published in May 2016 in the UK, where it won the overall Waterstones Children's Book Prize 2017 and the British Book Awards Children's Book of the Year. The US release was in November 2016. It has sold to more than 25 territories around the world and is a perennial bestseller in the UK.

Hargrave's poetry has appeared internationally in journals such as Magma, Room, Agenda, Shearsman, The Irish Literary Review and Orbis. In 2013, Neil Astley judged her poem "Grace" as winner of the Yeovil Literary Prize. This poem appeared in her third collection, Splitfish (Gatehouse Press, 2013). Her first piece as a playwright, about human trafficking, was entitled BOAT, and first dramatized in October 2015 by PIGDOG theatre company at Theatre N16 in Balham. It opened to five-star reviews, with CultureFly calling it "the most compelling and urgent piece of theatre you will see this year."

Her second children's novel of The Island at the End of Everything (2017) which is set in the early 1900s in the Culion leper colony in the Philippines was shortlisted for the 2017 Costa Book Awards. Her third children's novel, The Way Past Winter, was published in late 2018, followed in 2019 by her debut YA novel, The Deathless Girls. Her first adult novel, The Mercies, was published by Picador in 2020, and became an instant bestseller. Julia and the Shark (2021) in collaboration with her husband, Tom de Freston, was shortlisted for Waterstones Book of the Year and the Wainwright Prize for Children's Writing on Nature and Conservation.

== Personal life ==
Hargrave currently lives in Oxford with her husband, the visual artist Tom de Freston. They have a daughter, born 2023. Hargrave had previously struggled with hyperfertility and a series of miscarriages. She is bisexual.

== Works ==
=== Adult novels ===
- —— (2020). The Mercies. Picador. ISBN 9780316529259.
- —— (2023). The Dance Tree. Picador. ISBN 9780063274778.
- —— (2026). Almost Life. Pan Macmillan. ISBN 9781668204276.

=== Young adult novels ===
- —— (2019). The Deathless Girls. Orion Children's Books. ISBN 9781510106741.

=== Children's books ===
- —— (2016). The Girl of Ink and Stars. Chicken House. ISBN 9781910002742.
- —— (2017). The Island at the End of Everything. Chicken House. ISBN 9781910002766.
- —— (2018). The Way Past Winter. Chicken House. ISBN 9781911077930.
- —— (2020). A Secret of Birds & Bone. Chicken House. ISBN 9781911077947.
- ——; de Freston, Tom (illustrator) (2 September 2021). Julia and the Shark. Orion Children's Books. ISBN 9781510107786.
- ——; —— (2022). Leila and the Blue Fox. Orion Children's Books. ISBN 9781510110274.

Geomancer Trilogy

- —— (2023). In the Shadow of the Wolf Queen. Orion Children's Books. ISBN 9781510107830.
- —— (2024). The Storm and the Sea Hawk. Orion Children's Books. ISBN 9781510107885.
- —— (2025). The Wolf Trials: World Book Day 2025. Orion Children's Books. ISBN 9781510113442.
- —— (2025). The Ship of Strays. Orion Children's Books. ISBN 9781510107939.

== Awards and recognitions ==
- 2013: Yeovil International Poetry Prize, winner
- 2017: Waterstones Children's Books Prize, winner (The Girl of Ink & Stars)
- 2017: British Book Awards Children's Book of the Year, winner (The Girl of Ink & Stars)
- 2017: Jhalak Prize, shortlist (The Girl of Ink & Stars)
- 2017: Costa Book Prize, shortlist (The Island at the End of Everything)
- 2018: The Blue Peter Book Award, shortlist (The Island at the End of Everything)
- 2018: Jhalak Prize, shortlist (The Island at the End of Everything)
- 2018: CILIP Carnegie Medal, longlist (The Island at the End of Everything)
- 2018: Blackwell's Children's Book of the Year, winner (The Way Past Winter)
- 2018: Specsaver's National Book Award, longlist (The Way Past Winter)
- 2019: YA Book Prize, shortlist (The Deathless Girls)
- 2020: The Diverse Book Awards, shortlist (The Deathless Girls)
- 2020: Prix Femina, finalist (The Mercies)
- 2020: Prix Rive Gauche à Paris, winner (The Mercies)
- 2021: CILIP Carnegie Medal, longlist (The Deathless Girls)
- 2021: Betty Trask Award (The Mercies)
- 2021: Waterstones Book of the Year, shortlist (Julia and the Shark)
- 2021: Waterstones Gift of the Year, winner (Julia and the Shark)
- 2022: Wainwright Prize for Children's Writing on Nature and Conservation, shortlist (Julia and the Shark)
- 2023: Jake Fox Award for Excellent Books (Julia and the Shark)
