= Anna James (writer) =

English children's writer (fl. 2025)

Anna James is an English writer of children's books.

== Early life and education ==
James grew up in Ponteland, Northumberland, and attended Ponteland Middle School and Ponteland High School.

== Career ==
James was a school librarian for five years before becoming book news and media editor at The Bookseller. There she launched their YouTube presence and established a prize for young adult literature, and during this period was shortlisted for the 2015 Kim Scott Walwyn Prize, which "celebrates exceptional women in publishing". has also been literary editor for ELLE UK.

== Writing ==
James published the "Pages & Co." series of six books, featuring a bookshop of that name, between 2018 and 2023, and in 2024 began her Chronicles of Whetherwhy.

Her Alice with a Why, a "reimagining" of Lewis Carroll's Alice's Adventures in Wonderland illustrated by Matthew Land, was shortlisted for the 2025 Waterstones Book of the Year.

Her first novel for adults, Good Fortunes, is to be published by HQ, an imprint of Harper Collins.

== Selected publications ==
=== Pages & Co. series ===
1. The Bookwanderers (2018, Harper Collins: ISBN 978-1-9848-3712-7)
2. The Lost Fairy Tales (2019, HarperCollins: ISBN 978-1-9848-3729-5)
3. The Map of Stories (2020, HarperCollins: ISBN 978-1-9848-3732-5)
4. The Book Smugglers (2021, HarperCollins: ISBN 978-0-00-841081-0)
5. The Treehouse Library (2022, HarperCollins ISBN 978-0-00-841088-9)
6. The Last Bookwanderer (2024, Harper Collins: ISBN 978-0-00-841092-6)

=== Whetherwhy Chronicles series ===
1. The Age of Enchantment (2024, HarperCollins: ISBN 978-0-00-861157-6)
2. The Season of Flames (to be published in 2026)

=== Standalone children's titles ===
- Alice with a Why (2025, Harper Collins: ISBN 978-0-00-861147-7)

=== Books for adults ===
- Good Fortunes (Forthcoming, as of December 2025)
