= Ponteland High School =

Location
- The Crescent Callerton Lane; Ponteland, Northumberland, NE20 9EG; England; 55°02′36″N 1°44′34″W

Information
- Type: Academy
- Established: 1972
- Local authority: Northumberland
- Trust: Pele Trust
- Department for Education URN: 145783 Tables
- Ofsted: Reports
- Head Master: Stefan McElwee
- Staff: 350
- Gender: Co-educational
- Age: 11 to 19
- Enrolment: 1060
- Website: Official website

Ponteland High School is a co-educational secondary school and sixth form located in Ponteland, Northumberland, England. It has had academy status since 2019.

== History ==
The school opened in purpose-built accommodation in September 1972. It was the first state school in the country to gain Language College status in 1995. In 2001, as a result of changes introduced in the School Standards and Framework Act 1998, the school changed from being a County High School to a Community High School offering courses and activities to the local community. Since 2000 there have been significant additions to and refurbishments of the school buildings including new science laboratories, a new sixth form centre and a four-classroom block added to the humanities area. A notable change to the school was a relocation in building. In September 2020, the school moved into a new building, which is shared with Ponteland Primary School and Ponteland Leisure Centre.

The School intended to leave Local Authority control and become a Foundation School with Trust status. The original plan was to effect this change by 1 January 2010 involving four local partners namely Northumberland County Council, the Co-operative Group, Newcastle Airport and the Newcastle Business School at Northumbria University.

The plans were delayed after opposition from the local community and staff who submitted as petition against it. Following this a new implementation date of April 2010 was announced. However this was further delayed by the decision of two of the four potential partner organisations in the trust, Newcastle Airport and Newcastle Business School, to pull out in January 2010.

The school converted to academy status in 2019, and then expanded from being a high school to a full secondary school, educating pupils between the ages of 11−19.

== Academic and extracurricular activities ==
The school has high academic achievement. At GCSE Level its proportion of A*-C grades including English and Maths is 71%. At A Level, its pass rate is 98% with 57% of students receiving A or B grades. Eighty per cent of the school's sixth form pupils go on to university.

The school had its best ever GCSE results in 2017 in spite of the recent changes to introduce more difficult GCSE qualifications. 79% of students achieved at least a standard pass in both English and Maths, which is an increase on 2016 results (76%). 31% of students achieved the English Baccalaureate, and 20% of students achieved 5 or more A*-A/7-9 grades, with 41% achieving 5 or more A*-B/6-9 grades.

In the core subjects of English and Maths in 2017:

- 89% of students gained a ‘standard pass’ (grade 4 or better) in English qualification
- 70% of students achieved a ‘strong pass’ (grade 5 or better)
- 81% of students gained a ‘standard pass’ (grade 4 or better) in Maths qualification
- 64% of students achieved a ‘strong pass’ (grade 5 or better)

At A level, results in 2017 were an improvement from 2016 with an increase in the average points score. In addition, 28% of all entries were awarded the top grades of A*-A or equivalent, with 49% A*-B and 69% A*-C. Over 40% of students gained A*-B grades in a wide range of courses.

The school won the Bar National Mock Trial in 2002 and 2009.

The school has a range of international activities in which pupils may participate, and for which the school was awarded International School Award for 1999–2001, 2002–2004, and 2013–14.

== Notable former pupils ==
- Helen Bailey - Writer
- Anna James - children's writer
- Neale McDermott – Former footballer
- Max Thompson - footballer
