= Susie Yang =

American novelist

- Born: June 19; Chongqing, China
- Education: Rutgers University
- Occupation: Novelist
- Writing career
- Genre: Fiction
- Website: www.susiebooks.com

Susie Yang (born June 19) is a Chinese American novelist currently based in the United Kingdom. Her first novel, White Ivy, was published by Simon & Schuster in November 2020. It became an instant New York Times bestseller and was longlisted for the Center for Fiction's 2020 First Novel Prize.

== Biography ==
Yang was born in Chongqing, China, and moved to the United States as a child. She received her doctorate of pharmacy from Rutgers University and launched a tech startup in San Francisco that taught coding.

She came up with her debut novel in 2016, working on the draft for nine months between the hours of 10 P.M. and 5 A.M, and landed a publishing deal near the end of 2017 with Simon & Schuster. White Ivy follows the unreliable narrator Ivy Lin, a second generation Chinese American who desires acceptance among the dominant white upper-class and will stop at nothing to obtain her dream. Yang was inspired by the television shows Breaking Bad and House of Cards, where "dominant male personalities ... do really awful things, but they're entertaining, and you watch them try to manipulate people." She also drew influence from her own upbringing as a Chinese American and spending summers in China.

== Bibliography ==
=== Standalone ===
- White Ivy (2020)

=== Short stories ===
- "Nutrire la Speranza" (2021; from Vogue Italia; ed. Federico Chiara)
- "The Unknowable Pleasures" (2023; from In These Hallowed Halls; ed. Marie O'Regan and Paul Kane)
