= White Ivy =

2020 book

- Author: Susie Yang
- Language: English
- Genre: Fiction; literary fiction; coming-of-age
- Publisher: Simon & Schuster
- Publication date: November 3, 2020
- Publication place: United States
- Pages: 368
- ISBN: 978-1982100612

White Ivy is the debut literary thriller novel of American writer Susie Yang that delves into themes of wealth, class, privilege, and otherness. Published through Simon & Schuster on November 3, 2020, it follows Chinese immigrant Ivy Lin, who moves with her family to the United States to pursue the American Dream. Ivy develops a crush on Gideon Speyer, the golden boy of her school who comes from an affluent political family, and offers the life she's always wanted. When they meet again as adults and enter a romantic relationship, someone from her past threatens her idyllic dream.

== Background ==
Prior to writing White Ivy, Yang completed a degree at pharmacy school and launched the tech start-up, BaseRails, that taught coding. In 2016, she came across the essay of Paul Graham, who advised those who wanted something not to fantasize if they didn't actually do it. This encouraged her to start the book. Her high school friend who got published, Lucy Tan, suggested she join a MFA program. Yang gave herself one year to conceive a novel, and handed the draft to her literary agent. She received offers from publishers in December 2017, and landed with Simon & Schuster.

The author described Ivy as an "anti-hero", where the beginning characterization as a thief and underestimated appearance was the root idea for the novel.

== Title ==
The title was based on the Chinese proverb featured in the book's epigraph: 'The snow goose need not bathe to make itself white', which connects to the protagonist's own desire to belong. Yang elaborated in an interview, "Ivy wants to be a snow goose, someone natural with inherent virtue, yet she rejects her own inherent virtues and aspires to the cultivated ones."

== Plot summary ==
Ivy is raised by her grandmother Meifeng in China until the age of five, where they move to live with her parents and younger brother in Boston, Massachusetts. She admires Meifeng, who teaches her how to steal from yard sales and secondhand stores. During middle grade, she desires popularity, though seldom fits in due to her shyness and Asian appearance. She harbors a crush on the golden boy of the school, Gideon Speyer, and has only one friend named Roux Roman, who is of lower-class with a prostitute as a mother.

When Ivy is invited to Gideon's fourteenth birthday party, she shops for a gift, which Roux ends up purchasing since she doesn't have the money. To Ivy's mortification, her family visits the Speyer residence the next morning to bring her home. Ivy's mother is furious that she lied about her whereabouts and discovers the items she's stolen, throwing them away. As an act of defiance, Ivy loses her virginity to Roux.

Ivy is sent to Chongqing, China, to live with her relatives for the summer. She decides to rebrand herself when she returns to school. Instead, her family moves to Clarksville, New Jersey, where Ivy attends a predominantly Chinese school. Going against her parents' wishes of getting into medical school or becoming married to a doctor, she enrolls into a women's college.

When Ivy is older, she returns to Boston as an elementary teacher and runs into Gideon's older sister, Sylvia, who is the cousin of one of her students. She is invited to Sylvia's New Year's party, where she reunites with Gideon. Later, she and Gideon go on a double date with his childhood friend, Tom Cross. At the outing, Tom and his girlfriend reveal their engagement.

As Ivy and Gideon progress to a romantic relationship, she is invited to vacation with him and his family at the Speyer summer cottage in Cattahasset. Sylvia also invites her date, which turns out to be Roux, who now appears to be a successful business owner. Ivy can't help but feel drawn to Roux, which Sylvia notices enough to become disgruntled.

When Roux has to leave (and subsequently breaks up with Sylvia), Ivy visits him during the night and announces she'll break up with Gideon and they can run away together. This sentiment changes when Gideon proposes to her the next day; Ivy accepts, much to Roux's disgust, who leaves. However, Ivy continues an affair with Roux due to lack of physical intimacy with Gideon.

Roux lavishes Ivy with gifts but has a temper. One day, he is furious and gives Ivy an ultimatum: she must disclose to Gideon about the affair and if they're still together, then Roux will leave her alone. If she fails to tell, then he will. Ivy orchestrates a romantic hiking trip in the mountains during wintertime, where she pushes Roux over a ledge of the unmarked trails. His death is ruled as a tragic accident.

On her wedding day, Ivy witnesses Tom tearfully say goodbye to Gideon and realizes they are gay but entered heterosexual relationships. She marries Gideon, anyway, to secure her future.

== Characters ==
- Ivy Lin – a second-generation Chinese American immigrant who seeks wealth, opportunity, and belonging in America.
- Meifeng – Ivy's maternal grandmother who teaches thievery and indulges her granddaughter's whims.
- Nan (née Miao) and Shen Lin – Ivy's strict mother and mild-mannered father.
- Austin Lin – Ivy's younger brother who is coddled by his family and flunks out of school and work.
- Roux Roman – a Romanian man who's had a hard upbringing and turns to criminal activity to rise up in power. He uses money, charm, and intimidation to get what he wants.
- Gideon Speyer – the golden boy who comes from a WASP family.
- Sylvia Speyer – Gideon's older sister who is popular and bohemian.
- Andrea – Ivy's promiscuous roommate who plays for the Boston Symphony Orchestra.
- Dave Finley – an elderly man who is the partner of a venture capital firm in Boston; husband to Liana.
- Liana Finley – a Chinese human-rights lawyer turned philanthropist; wife to Dave.

== Reception ==
White Ivy was met with mostly positive critical reception, including starred reviews from Booklist and Library Journal. It was included on Jenna Bush Hager's book club picks.

In a starred review, Shelf Awareness called it an "electrifying debut novel" and suspenseful, where "one surprise begets another shocking turn." Library Journal held equal enthusiasm, stating how Yang "[skillfully created a] surprising, even shocking plot twists will leave readers breathless." Victoria Zhuang of The Boston Globe wrote, "The plot, at times thriller-paced, makes it an easy page-turner, but the cutting prose movingly portrays many layers of tribulation and traumas, and marks Yang as a voice to watch."

Morgan Hines of USA Today conceded that while the protagonist's decisions are immoral, "Yang's expert character development leads the reader to grapple with [it] just as much as she does as Ivy pursues the aspirational life she crafted during adolescence." The Washington Post's Leland Cheuk penned, "a highly entertaining, well-plotted character study", while The Irish Times's Sarah Gilmartin compared it to a hybrid of Jane Austen and Donna Tartt.

The Globe and Mail contributor Margaret Cannon described it as a "first-rate psychological novel with an intriguing and memorable heroine." In a similar vein, Publishers Weekly asserted how the author "has created an ambitious and sharp yet believably flawed heroine who will win over any reader, and the accomplished plot is layered and full of revelations."

Los Angeles Times wrote favorably of how "each plot point of the romance is fulfilled but also undercut by a traumatic pratfall, described in language as bright and scarring as a wound." Lynn Steger Strong of The New York Times was less sanguine, saying how it began as an interesting concept though Ivy's stealing was less relevant in the first half and there were little consequences for her actions. Strong summarized how the book "is chock-full of compelling, exciting ideas. What it does not quite do is give the reader access to the experiences that might portray those ideas effectively in the context of a narrative."

== Adaptation ==
The screen rights were sold to Shonda Rhimes for a reported sum of $150 million, who envisioned it as a Netflix limited series. Yang saw Rooney Mara or Elle Fanning as Sylvia and Timothée Chalamet to fit any of the male roles.
