= R. F. Kuang =

American writer (born 1996)

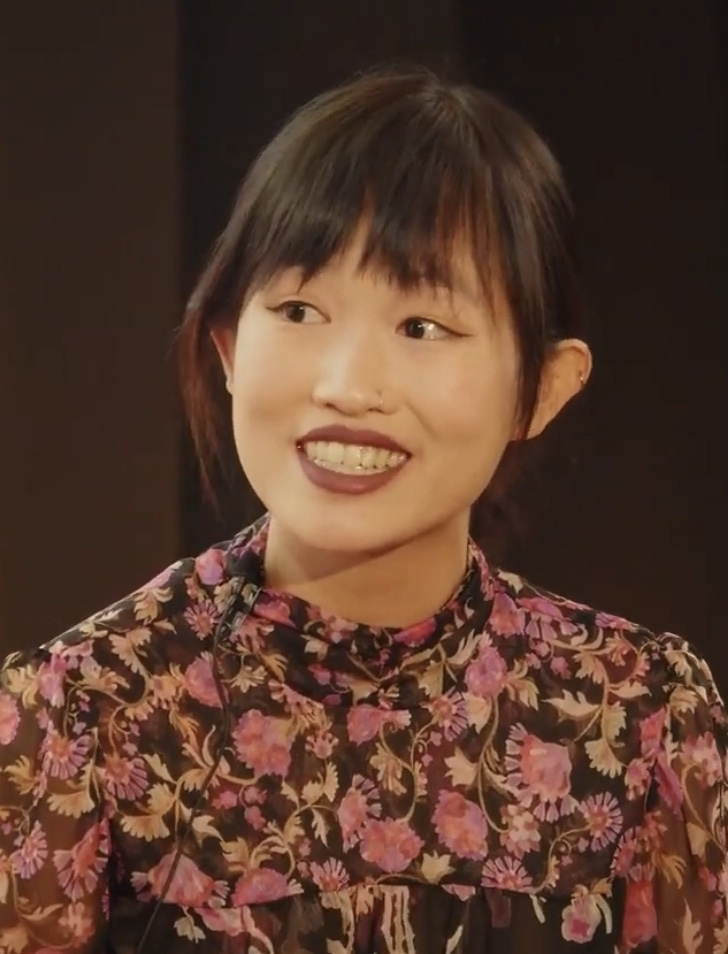
- Kuang in 2023
- Born: May 29, 1996 (age 30); Guangzhou, Guangdong, China
- Education: Georgetown University (BA); Magdalene College, Cambridge (MPhil); University College, Oxford (MSc); Yale University
- Occupation: Author
- Spouse: Bennett Eckert-Kuang
- Writing career
- Language: English
- Years active: 2018–present
- Notable awards: Compton Crook Award (2019); Crawford Award (2019); Astounding Award for Best New Writer (2020)

Chinese name
- Traditional Chinese: 匡靈秀
- Simplified Chinese: 匡灵秀
Transcriptions
Standard Mandarin
- Hanyu Pinyin: Kuāng Língxiù
- Wade–Giles: K’uang Ling-hsiu
- Website: rfkuang.com

Rebecca F. Kuang (Chinese: 匡灵秀; pinyin: Kuāng Língxiù; born May 29, 1996), writing as R. F. Kuang, is an American novelist and short-story writer. She is known for her fantasy novels, which include The Poppy War trilogy and her novel Babel, or the Necessity of Violence (2022), which placed first on The New York Times Best Seller list and won the 2022 Nebula Award for Best Novel. She is currently the inaugural Millard Distinguished Writer in Residence at the College of the Holy Cross.

== Early life and education ==
Kuang was born in Guangzhou, China. She immigrated to the U.S. with her family when she was four years old. Her father was raised in Leiyang, Hunan, and her mother was raised in Hainan province. Her maternal grandfather was a soldier under Chiang Kai-shek. Her father's family experienced the Japanese occupation of Hunan during World War II.

Kuang was raised in Dallas, Texas, and graduated from the Greenhill School in 2013. She has said that China Miéville's books added adult fantasy to her teenage reading list. After high school, she attended Georgetown University, where she majored in history. While in college, Kuang began writing Poppy War during a gap year in China, where she worked as a debate coach. The book was published shortly before her 22nd birthday. She graduated from the Odyssey Writing Workshop in 2016, then from Georgetown's School of Foreign Service in June 2018.

After graduation, Kuang received a Marshall Scholarship to pursue graduate studies in England. She obtained an M.Phil. from Magdalene College, Cambridge, in Chinese studies and an M.Sc. in contemporary Chinese studies from University College, Oxford. Kuang returned to the United States in the fall of 2020 to pursue a Ph.D. in East Asian languages and literatures at Yale University. In 2023, she spent two months in Taipei for an intensive Mandarin course at the International Chinese Language Program.

== Career ==
Kuang publishes as both R. F. Kuang and Rebecca F. Kuang. She has cited the works of Vladimir Nabokov, Kazuo Ishiguro, Susanna Clarke, and Joan Didion as major influences on her writing.

=== Poppy War trilogy ===
Kuang's debut novel The Poppy War, a Chinese military fantasy, was published by Harper Voyager in 2018 and is the first book in the Poppy War trilogy. The Poppy War has received mainly favorable reviews, with Publishers Weekly calling it "a strong and dramatic launch to Kuang's career". In October 2020, the first two books in the Poppy War trilogy were included in Time magazine's list of the 100 best fantasy books of all time.

In December 2020, Peter Luo's Starlight Media, the U.S. film subsidiary of China-based Starlight Culture Entertainment Group, optioned the rights to adapt Kuang's Poppy Wars trilogy for television with SA Inc. producing. The TV adaption has been stuck in development hell since 2020.

==== The Poppy War ====
The Poppy War, a grimdark fantasy, draws its plot and politics from mid-20th-century China, with the conflict in the novel based on the Second Sino-Japanese War, and an atmosphere inspired by the Song dynasty. The Poppy War was nominated for the 2019 World Fantasy Award for Best Novel.

==== The Dragon Republic ====
Released in 2019, The Dragon Republic is the sequel to The Poppy War. The Nikan Empire begins to fall apart due to infighting and the Hesperians return. The reviewer for Fantasy Book Review wrote: "Kuang excels at wreaking emotional havoc while delivering a powerful meditation on war and survival." Publishers Weekly said that "Kuang brings brilliance to this invigorating and complex military fantasy sequel to The Poppy War."

==== The Burning God ====
Released in 2020, The Burning God is the sequel to The Dragon Republic and the conclusion to the Poppy Wars series. Rin fights the forces that have torn her country apart into a civil war. A reviewer for The Fantasy Hive wrote: "Rebecca Kuang's conclusion to her debut trilogy, The Poppy War, is testament to her growth as a writer; not only is it a fitting close to an ambitious series." The reviewer for Publishers Weekly said that "[t]he result is a satisfying if not happy end to the series."

=== Babel ===
Babel is an alternative history novel, set in a fantastical version of Oxford in 1830s England. In the second week of September 2022, Babel was placed at the top spot on The New York Times Best Seller list for hardcover fiction, but dropped to the ninth spot the following week before disappearing from the list by the end of the month. Kuang's Babel was excluded from consideration for the 2023 Hugo Award along with Chinese Canadian author Xiran Jay Zhao's Iron Widow. The awards ceremony that year was held in Chengdu, China, and leaked emails later revealed that an administrator had recommended that books whose content might prove controversial in China be excluded from the list of nominees.

The screen rights options for this novel were sold in early 2024 to wiip studios for a television and/or film adaptation with Temple Hill Entertainment producing.

=== Yellowface ===
Publisher William Morrow and Company stated in a press release that Kuang's fifth novel, Yellowface, follows "a white author who steals an unpublished manuscript, written by a more successful Asian American novelist who died in a freak accident, and publishes it as her own". The title of the novel, Yellowface, refers to the film industry practice of yellowface, in which white actors are used to portray Asian characters, analogously to blackface, in which white actors use makeup to portray black or African characters. Satirical, sharp and cynical (in accordance with a review posted at an online site), this book is Kuang's first foray into the literary fiction genre. Writing in the "Acknowledgement" section of the book, Kuang considers her book a "horror story about loneliness in a fiercely competitive industry".

In the last week of May 2023, Yellowface debuted at the eighth spot on the Los Angeles Times bestseller list for hardcover fiction. In the first week of June 2023, Yellowface debuted at the fifth spot on The New York Times Best Seller list for hardcover fiction. The reviewer for NPR called the book "a well-executed, gripping, fast-paced novel about the nuances of the publishing world when an author is desperate enough to do anything for success." Writing for the New York Times, award-winning author Amal El-Mohtar wrote that the novel is "a breezy and propulsive read, a satirical literary thriller that's enjoyable and uncomfortable in equal measure."

The screen rights options were sold to Lionsgate Television in late 2024 with Karyn Kusama slated to direct and executive produce a potential limited series based upon this novel with Constance Wu, Justine Suzanne Jones, and Ben Smith announced as producers.

=== Katabasis ===
In February 2023, Kuang reported that while working on her doctoral degree at Yale, she was also working on her sixth novel, a fantasy about two PhD students who study magick at Cambridge University. After their adviser is killed in an experiment, the students travel to Hell "to rescue the soul of their [adviser so that he] can write their job recommendation letters". In an interview with The Guardian, Kuang calls the project "nonsense literature". During a November 2023 book promotion tour at the Brattle Theatre near Harvard University, Kuang stated that her upcoming book "... started as this cute, silly adventure novel about like, 'Haha, academia is hell.' And then I was writing it and I was like, 'Oh, no, academia is hell.'"

The publisher HarperCollins described the book as a dark academia fantasy in which "Dante's Inferno meets Susanna Clarke's Piranesi". Book Riot named Kuang's sixth novel as "one of the most anticipated books of 2025". Katabasis was released in August 2025.

Obtaining an advance reader copy (ARC or eARC (electronic ARC)) of Katabasis several months before the book was made available to general public was highly prized among some readers. Early eARC reviews were very positive.

In an Elle magazine interview, the author described Katabasis as "a world of ideas, and [she] liked the freedom to chase a logical paradox or a philosophical puzzle."

A week before the book was scheduled to be released, the screen rights options for the novel were sold to Amazon MGM Studios for development as a television series with Angela Kang set as writer and showrunner. Kang will also executive produce along with Kuang, Mandy Safavi, Ben Smith, and Jeffrey Weiner.

=== Taipei Story ===
In April 2023, she also announced that two additional books had been acquired by HarperCollins, a "historical novel and a fantasy," neither of which are Katabasis.

Two years later, she finished the first draft of her seventh novel, titled Taipei Story, in April 2025. At a November 2024 University College Oxford literary discussion, Kuang described her book as a "love story set in the capital of Taiwan", a story that is unrelated to the 1985 Taiwanese movie of the same name. Taipei Story was released on September 8, 2026.

The novel is a coming-of-age work about a college freshman at a language study abroad program in Taipei. In another interview, Kuang stated that the book is "about language, grief, and coming of age." In a third interview, Kuang described the seventh book as "literary fiction". She also describes it as "a coming-of-age story set in a language school in Taiwan, which will be in the larky style of the American novelists Elif Batuman and Patricia Lockwood." "The main character, studying abroad in Taipei, doesn't learn Chinese before her grandfather unexpectedly passes." Kuang wrote this book after the death of her grandfather.

== Academic career ==
In June 2026, she was appointed as the inaugural Millard Distinguished Writer in Residence at the College of the Holy Cross.

== Personal life ==
Kuang is married to Bennett Eckert-Kuang, a philosopher and Junior Fellow at the Harvard Society of Fellows, whom she met in high school.

== Awards and honors ==
In addition, Kuang has won the Compton Crook Award, the Crawford Award, and the 2020 Astounding Award for Best New Writer, and has been a finalist for the Nebula, Locus, World Fantasy, Kitschies, and British Fantasy awards for the 2018 novel The Poppy War. Elle magazine called Kuang "a prolific phenomenon".

In 2018, Barnes & Noble included The Poppy War on their list of Favorite Science Fiction & Fantasy Books of 2018.

In 2022, Kirkus Reviews and The Washington Post named Babel, or the Necessity of Violence one of the best science fiction and fantasy books of the year. Amazon, NPR, and Barnes & Noble named it one of the best books of the year, regardless of genre.

In 2023, Kuang appeared on the Time 100 Next list & was also nominated for the 2023 Books Are My Bag Readers' Awards' "Breakthrough Author" of the year.

=== Honors ===
Year	Award	Category	Result	Ref.
2019	John W. Campbell Award for Best New Writer	—	Finalist	
2020	Astounding Award for Best New Writer	—	Won	
2023	Books Are My Bag Readers' Awards	Breakthrough Author	Shortlisted	

=== Literary awards ===
Year	Title	Award	Category	Result	Ref.
2018	The Poppy War	BookNest Fantasy Award	Debut Novel	Shortlisted	
2018	The Poppy War	Goodreads Choice Award	Debut Author	Nominated–7th	
2018	The Poppy War	Goodreads Choice Award	Fantasy	Nominated–6th	
2018	The Poppy War	Kitschies	Golden Tentacle (Debut)	Finalist	
2018	The Poppy War	Nebula Award	Novel	Finalist	
2019	The Poppy War	British Fantasy Award	Sydney J. Bounds Award	Shortlisted	
2019	The Poppy War	Compton Crook Award	—	Won	
2019	The Poppy War	Crawford Award	—	Won	
2019	The Poppy War	Locus Award	First Novel	Nominated–2nd	
2019	The Poppy War	RUSA CODES Reading List	Fantasy	Shortlisted	
2019	The Poppy War	World Fantasy Award	Novel	Finalist	
2019	The Dragon Republic	Goodreads Choice Award	Fantasy	Nominated–14th	
2020	The Dragon Republic	Ignyte Award	Adult Novel	Finalist	
2020	The Burning God	Goodreads Choice Award for	Fantasy	Nominated–11th	
2021	The Poppy War trilogy	Hugo Award	Series	Finalist	
2022	Babel, or the Necessity of Violence	Goodreads Choice Award	Fantasy	Nominated–2nd	
2022	Babel, or the Necessity of Violence	Nebula Award	Novel	Won	
2022	Babel, or the Necessity of Violence	New England Book Award	—	Shortlisted	
2022	Babel, or the Necessity of Violence	Waterstones Book of the Year	—	Shortlisted	
2023	Babel, or the Necessity of Violence	Alex Awards	—	Won	
2023	Babel, or the Necessity of Violence	British Book Award	Fiction	Won	
2023	Babel, or the Necessity of Violence	Dragon Awards	Fantasy Novel	Shortlisted	
2023	Babel, or the Necessity of Violence	Ignyte Awards	Adult Novel	Shortlisted	
2023	Babel, or the Necessity of Violence	Locus Award	Fantasy Novel	Won	
2023	Babel, or the Necessity of Violence	RUSA CODES Reading List	Fantasy	Shortlisted	
2023	Yellowface	Books Are My Bag Readers' Awards	—	Shortlisted	
2023	Yellowface	Foyles Books of the Year	Fiction	Won	
2023	Yellowface	Goodreads Choice Awards	Fiction	Won	
2023	Yellowface	Libby Book Award	Book Club Pick	Won	
2023	Yellowface	Los Angeles Times Book Prize n. Helen Laser	Audiobook	Finalist	
2023	Yellowface	New England Book Award	Fiction	Won	
2023	Yellowface	Waterstones Book of the Year	—	Shortlisted	
2024	Yellowface	American Book Awards	—	Won	
2024	Yellowface	Aspen Words Literary Prize	—	Longlisted	
2024	Yellowface	Audie Awards n. Helen Laser	Fiction	Finalist	
2024	Yellowface	British Book Awards	Fiction	Won	
2024	Yellowface	Goldsboro Books Glass Bell Award	—	Longlisted	
2024	Yellowface	Indie Book Awards (UK)	Fiction	Won	
2025	Katabasis	Nebula Award	Novel	Finalist	
2026	Katabasis	Locus Award	Fantasy Novel	Finalist	
2026	Babel, or the Necessity of Violence	Seiun Award	Translated novel	Won	

== Bibliography ==
=== Poppy War series ===
- —— (2018). The Poppy War (hardcover 1st ed.). Harper Voyager. ISBN 978-0-06-266256-9.
- —— (2019). The Dragon Republic (hardcover 1st ed.). Harper Voyager. ISBN 978-0-06-266263-7.
- —— (2020). The Burning God (hardcover 1st ed.). Harper Voyager. ISBN 978-0-06-266262-0.
- —— (2020). The Drowning Faith. Harper Voyager. A collection of three episodes related to the series, "from Nezha's point of view"

=== Other novels ===
- —— (2022). Babel, or the Necessity of Violence (hardcover 1st ed.). Harper Voyager. ISBN 978-0-06-302142-6.
- —— (2023). Yellowface (hardcover 1st ed.). Harper Voyager. ISBN 978-0-06-325083-3.
- —— (2025). Katabasis (deluxe lmtd ed.). Harper Voyager. ISBN 978-0-06-302147-1.
- —— (2026). Taipei Story (hardcover 1st ed.). William Morrow. ISBN 978-0-06-347374-4.

=== Anthology (edited works) ===
- ——, ed. (2023). The Best American Science Fiction and Fantasy 2023. Series editor John Joseph Adams. New York: Mariner Books. ISBN 978-0-06-331574-7. (guest editor)

=== Short stories ===
- —— (July 2020). "The Nine Curves River". In Strahan, Jonathan (ed.). The Book of Dragons (anthology). ISBN 978-0-06-287716-1. (story read by LeVar Burton via LeVar Burton Reads)
- —— (November 2020). "Against All Odds". From a Certain Point of View: 40 stories celebrating 40 years of The Empire Strikes Back (anthology). Random House Worlds. ISBN 978-0-593-15774-9.
  The short story is in the Star Wars universe, about a Rebel Alliance defender on the ice planet Hoth named Dak Ralter.
- —— (November 2025). "Making Space". In Adams, John Joseph (ed.). The Time Traveler's Passport (anthology). ISBN 978-1-6625-3110-1.

=== Non-fiction ===
- —— (March 6, 2018). "How to Talk to Ghosts". Uncanny Magazine. No. 21.
