= The Burning God =

2020 fantasy novel by R. F. Kuang

- First edition
- Author: R. F. Kuang
- Audio read by: Emily Woo Zeller
- Cover artist: Jung Shan Chang
- Language: English
- Series: Poppy War trilogy
- Release number: 3
- Genre: Grimdark, High fantasy
- Publisher: Harper Voyager
- Publication date: November 17, 2020
- Publication place: United States
- Media type: Print, digital
- Pages: 640
- ISBN: 978-0062662620 (hardback)
- OCLC: 1141153867
- Preceded by: The Dragon Republic

The Burning God is a grimdark fantasy novel by American writer R. F. Kuang and published by Harper Voyager on November 17, 2020, as the third and final installment in her Poppy War trilogy.

== Background ==
The book was published on November 17, 2020, by Harper Voyager. In a 2020 interview with Andrew Liptak for Tor.com, Kuang said that Rin was based on Mao Zedong. In the book, Rin is now the leader of the Southern Coalition, which is going to war with Vaisra.

== Plot ==
Having been betrayed by the ruling House of Yin of the Nikan Republic, the fire shaman Fang Runin "Rin" and her comrades Chen Kitay and Sring Venka escape to join the Southern Coalition's resistance against the Republic and its domineering Hesperian allies. Taking advantage of the Republic's current focus on eliminating Imperial holdouts in the North, Rin leads a Southerner army on a campaign to liberate the South from remaining Federation of Mugen holdouts from the Third Poppy War.

Eventually she liberates her childhood home town of Tikany, but a surprise Republican-Hesperian attack inflicts heavy casualties on the Southerner army. During the attack, Rin encounters the former Empress Su Daji, who allies with Rin in their shared objective of removing Hesperian presence in Nikan. Shortly thereafter, the Southern leaders betray Rin to the Republic, exchanging her in hopes of negotiating a peace. However, Daji hypnotizes Rin's captors and diverts their transport to the Chuluu Korikh, where she revives from immurement the "Gatekeeper" and Rin's Lore Master, Jiang Ziya.

Daji and Jiang are members of the Trifecta, a trio of extremely powerful spiritually-bound shamans. They aim to wake their third member, the Dragon Emperor Yin Riga, from confinement at the Heavenly Temple on Mount Tianshan. En route, Rin, Daji and Jiang rescue Kitay from Republican captivity. They then reunite with the Southerner army and break through a Republican-Hesperian siege. Rin captures and executes the Republican leader Yin Vaisra, and the Southern leaders who had betrayed her.

After a grueling march, the Southerner army joins with allies from Dog Province near Mount Tianshan. Rin, Daji and Jiang enter the Heavenly Temple and wake Riga, who attempts to kill Rin. To escape, Rin attracts the attention of Hesperian forces. In the resulting battle, the Trifecta and a large portion of the Hesperian forces are destroyed, but Rin survives.

With the Republican-Hesperian forces significantly weakened, Rin marches on the capital Arlong, where she hopes to defeat her schoolmate and new Republican leader, Yin Nezha. While battle rages in Arlong, Rin infiltrates Arlong's nearby grottos in hope of defeating the Dragon god, which is the source of Nezha's shamanic powers over water. The Dragon and Nezha prove too powerful initially, but a Hesperian device neutralizes the Dragon. Rin's forces succeed in capturing Arlong, prompting the Republican-Hesperian forces to evacuate Nikan.

Rin, Kitay and Venka attempt to govern in the civil war's aftermath. Venka is killed while protecting Rin from an assassination attempt. Facing a continent-wide famine among other challenges to their rule, Rin and Kitay meet with Nezha on Speer to discuss terms for accessing Hesperian aid. The terms prove too onerous and humiliating, so Rin considers continuing the war by unleashing the full destructive power of the Phoenix god. However, realizing this course will lead to utter global destruction, Rin instead sacrifices herself and Kitay, in doing so giving Nezha a chance to save Nikan through strategic supplication to the Hesperians.

== Reception ==
Publishers Weekly found it a satisfying, if not happy, conclusion to the series. Kirkus Reviews similarly described it as a bleak and devastating conclusion. Booklist called it a poignant conclusion and later included it among its top ten science fiction, fantasy and horror novels of 2021. Library Journal praised its flawed characters and worldbuilding. Writing for Locus, Elsa Sjunneson was critical of the novel's depiction of disability. The novel was also a nominee in the 2020 Goodreads Choice Awards.
