= Katabasis (novel) =

2025 fantasy novel by R. F. Kuang

- Author: R. F. Kuang
- Audio read by: Morag Sims; Will Watt
- Cover artist: Patrick Arrasmith
- Language: English
- Genre: Fantasy
- Publisher: Harper Voyager
- Publication date: August 26, 2025
- Publication place: United States
- Pages: 560
- ISBN: 978-0063021471

Katabasis is a 2025 fantasy novel by American writer R. F. Kuang. It was released on August 26, 2025. The novel follows two magicians, doctoral candidates, who must venture into hell to save their thesis advisor in order to receive letters of recommendation.

Katabasis received mixed reviews, with some critics describing it as overlong and meandering.

== Background ==
In 2023, Kuang announced that she was writing her sixth novel, Katabasis. Kuang wrote it while being enrolled as a PhD student in East Asian Languages and Literatures at Yale University, teaching, and planning her wedding. She stated that the idea for the book came out of a "cute, silly" idea about how "academia is hell" before seriously realizing, "Oh, no, academia is hell."

== Plot ==
Alice Law, a postgraduate student steeped in the arcane arts at Cambridge, practices a dangerous and archaic form of magick. When a mismanaged spell causes her adviser, the influential Professor Jacob Grimes, to perish violently, his spirit is dispatched to Hell. Consumed by what she believes is her own guilt and a desperate need for his letter of recommendation to secure her academic future, Alice resolves to retrieve his soul. The ritual to open a gateway to the underworld demands a steep price: half her remaining lifespan. Her plans are complicated when her academic competitor and colleague, Peter Murdoch, forces his way into her descent. Alice harbors a deep resentment for Peter, who has always been the department's favored student, making his companionship an unwelcome burden on her mission.

Their journey through the afterlife brings them into contact with skeletal beings commanded by Nick and Magnolia Kripke, two amoral magicians on a quest for the Dialetheia, an object capable of creating a True Contradiction. During these encounters, Alice learns that a pentagram Grimes had drawn on her grants a peculiar resistance to the memory-wiping waters of the Lethe. The travelers soon face a test from a divine being, the Weaver Girl, who offers them a choice presented as two apples. Alice's subconscious decision differs from Peter's, an act of disloyalty that leaves him ensnared by the deity. The timely arrival of Elspeth Bayes, a former advisee of Grimes who took her own life years prior, saves them from the Kripkes' minions. However, upon discovering their objective is to rescue Grimes, a furious Elspeth casts them from her boat, abandoning them.

Alone, the two scholars begin to share their histories. Alice discloses that Grimes had assaulted her and that her true intention is vengeance: to bind his spirit to her will, making him her instrument. Peter then admits his own culpability; he intentionally overlooked the fatal error in the spell after the professor stole his research. His plan had been to use a specific incantation to let Alice escape the underworld alone and clear her name. Soon after, they become stuck in an impossible geometric prison constructed by the Kripkes. Peter devises a solution based on the Hangman's Paradox, a logical puzzle that guarantees his own demise but frees Alice. Alone in the Land of Dis, she contrives a stratagem to defeat the Kripkes, luring them and their child into the Lethe, which permanently erases their identities.

Elspeth reappears, bestowing the Dialetheia upon Alice and clarifying that the Kripkes had been hunting her, not Alice, all along. Granted an audience with Lord Yama, the underworld's adjudicator, Alice summons Grimes's shade. The professor attempts to lure her into an eternity of study by his side, but she is no longer under his influence. She rejects him and exchanges his soul for Peter's return. Reunited, Alice and Peter share an immediate, heartfelt kiss. Alice then presents the Dialetheia to Yama, negotiating a final bargain: the restoration of half their sacrificed years and safe passage back to the mortal world.

== Critical reception ==
=== Reviews ===
Reviews for Katabasis among critics have been mixed.

In a starred review, Kirkus Reviews stated "this is a tightly constructed novel that aims a clear lens on academia, with both its faults and its virtues" and called it "a learned, literary manifesto on academia—and its darkness." Also in a starred review, Library Journal called the book "A must-read for fans of Naomi Novik, Olivie Blake, and Lev Grossman's scholastic fantasies, with explorations of purpose, grief, and relationships that open the novel to a more universal audience." The reviewer for The Guardian called the book "a celebration of the acrobatics of thought." Writing for The New York Times Book Review, American author Kiersten White wrote "Overall, “Katabasis” shines with devastatingly real characters and absorbing world building. Kuang’s sentences are delicious, her insights well-earned and deeply affecting. She’s also funny." In his Locus Magazine article, Gary K. Wolfe called the book "A rich combination of dream vision, acerbic satire, intellectual playfulness, and human drama." The NPR reviewer raved about Katabasis.

In a more measured review, Publishers Weekly stated "[Kuang] takes readers on a clever and deeply cerebral, if sometimes fatiguing, journey through hell... It’s not perfect, but Kuang’s devoted fans will find this hits the spot."

Writing for The Washington Post, critic Stephen Kearse called the novel a "bloated, tedious epic," stating that "instead of immersive environments and scenes, Kuang offers tedious problem sets that lack narrative tension" and calling Katabasis "a dark academia tale that dawdles like a graduation ceremony." In her Slate Magazine review, critic Laura Miller noted that "Kuang’s abiding weakness as a novelist lies with character" and that the novel "is an unusual fusion of academic satire and allegory, but it’s also obsessed with the toll of superhuman diligence and the overvaluing of rank and laurels." Miller went on to write that the novel loses its footing when it "goes astray in long passages on the torments of Alice’s conscience and other, less coherent agonies that resemble passages from a teenager’s diary; when Kuang flaunts her familiarity with philosophers and logical thought problems to no great furtherance of the story; and when she delivers the pat romantic ending that her worst readers expect of her." The reviewer for The Irish Times admitted that the book was not meant for her and she found the book tiresome and wished that she "could have skipped chunks in the middle".

=== Lists ===
For the week ending August 30, 2025, Katabasis debuted at the top spots of both The New York Times Best Seller lists for Hardcover Fiction and for Combined Print & E-Book Fiction. The book remained at the top position for Hardcover Fiction for two consecutive weeks before dropping down to number 2 during the third on the Hardcover Fiction list while dropping to number three for Combined Print & E-Book Fiction during the second week on the list. The book remained on the Hardcover Fiction and the Combined Print & E-Book Fiction lists for a continuous five weeks since its debut.

The book also debuted:

- at the number one position in the Southern California Bestsellers list for Hardcover Fiction for the week of September 7, 2025 and remained there for two consecutive weeks before dropping to number 2 during its third week on the list. The book remained on the Hardcover Fiction list for five concecutive weeks since its debut.
- at the top spot on the USA Today's Best-selling Booklist for the week of September 3, 2025 and remained there for two consecutive weeks before dropping to number four during its third week on the list. The book remained on the Booklist for five consecutive weeks since its debut.
- at the top spot in August 2025 on the Official UK Top 50.
- as the Canadian Indie Bookstore Overall top bestseller for a week during the month of August.

=== Awards and honors ===
For their September 2025 Indie Next List, the American Booksellers Association had selected Katabasis as their number one pick.

Katabasis was a finalist for the 2025 Nebula Award for Best Novel and the 2026 Locus Award for Best Fantasy Novel.

== Adaptation ==
Before the book was released, the screen rights options for the novel were sold to Amazon MGM Studios for development as a television series with Angela Kang set as writer and showrunner. Kang is also said to executive produce along with Kuang, Mandy Safavi, Ben Smith, and Jeffrey Weiner, with Adam Docksey acting as co-executive producer.
