= Tanya Byrne =

English writer

- Born: Tanya Elizabeth Byrne; 23 December 1976 (age 49); London, England
- Occupations: novelist, freelance journalist
- Writing career
- Pen name: Lizzie Byron
- Genres: young adult; romance
- Notable work: Heart-Shaped Bruise

Tanya Elizabeth Byrne (born 23 December 1976) is a British author and freelance journalist. She mostly writes young adult fiction. Byrne has also written adult fiction under the pen name Lizzie Byron.

== Early life ==
Byrne is from East London. Her late mother was Guyanese. Byrne studied Law.

== Career ==
Byrne began her career working for BBC Radio. After eight years at BBC, she left to write her first novel Heart-Shaped Bruise, which was published by Headline in 2012. This was followed by Follow Me Down in 2013 and For Holly in 2015.

In 2018, Byrne collaborated on the novel Floored with Sara Barnard, Holly Bourne, Non Pratt, Melinda Salisbury, Lisa Williamson, and Eleanor Wood. She also contributed to the short story anthology A Change is Gonna Come, which was named a Sunday Times Children's Book of the Week, and Juno Dawson's 2019 Proud anthology.

Byrne moved to Hachette Children's Group (HGC) in 2019 for the publication of her next YA novel Afterlife in 2021.

Under the pen name Lizzie Byron, Hodder & Stoughton acquired the rights to publish her debut adult romance novel Someday at Christmas in 2020. Her second adult novel was Suddenly That Summer (2022). As a journalist, Byron has written for The Guardian and The Pool.

Byrne's next YA novels In the Shallows and Rebel Hearts were published in 2024 and 2025 respectively.

== Adaptations ==
In March 2021, Two Rivers Media optioned the rights to adapt Afterlove for television.

== Personal life ==
Byrne moved to Brighton in 2017 and now lives there with her dog Frida. She came out as gay at age 40.

== Publications ==
=== Young adult ===
- Heart-Shaped Bruise (2012)
- Follow Me Down (2013)
- For Holly (2015)
- Floored (2018) (co-written with six other authors)
- Afterlove (2021)
- In the Shallows (2024)
- Rebel Hearts (2025)

=== Adult ===
- Someday at Christmas (2020)
- Suddenly That Summer (2022)

=== Contributions ===
- "Hackney Moon" in A Change is Gonna Come (2017)
- "Almost Certainly" in Proud (2019), edited by Juno Dawson

== Accolades ==
Year	Award	Category	Title	Result	Ref.
2012	Crime Thriller Awards	CWA New Blood Dagger	Heart-Shaped Bruise	Shortlisted	
2012	National Book Awards	New Writer of the Year	Heart-Shaped Bruise	Shortlisted	
2013	Branford Boase Award		Heart-Shaped Bruise	Longlisted	
2018	YA Book Prize	Special Achievement Award	A Change is Gonna Come	Won	(Note: Shared with fellow authors and publishers of the anthology.)
2022	YA Book Prize		Afterlove	Shortlisted	
