= Zain Iqbal =

British actor (born 1998)

- Born: 28 May 1998 (age 28)
- Education: Royal Exchange Theatre
- Occupation: Actor
- Years active: 2019–present
- Height: 6 ft 2 in (1.88 m)

Zain Iqbal (born 28 May 1998) is a British actor. He is known for his role as Ravi Singh in the BBC Three teen crime drama A Good Girl's Guide to Murder (2024), based on the novel of the same name.

== Early life and education ==
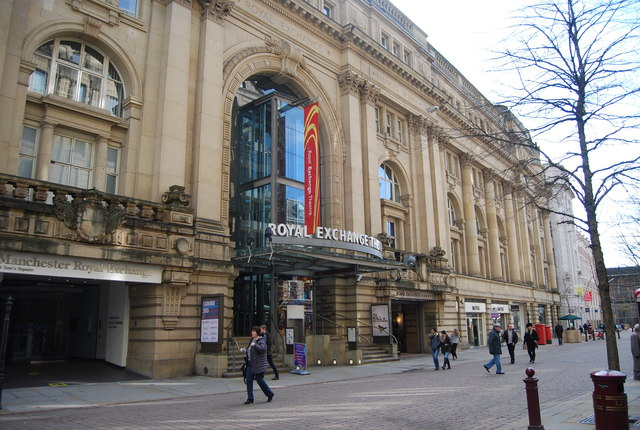
The Royal Exchange Theatre, where Iqbal studied in the Young Company programme

Iqbal grew up in Cheadle, Greater Manchester. Iqbal's father is a film buff and introduced him to Western films growing up. He cites Marlon Brando and Clint Eastwood as his biggest acting inspirations, and admired their performances from a young age in films like The Godfather and The Good, the Bad and the Ugly. He particularly looked up to Dev Patel and Riz Ahmed to see how actors who look like him navigate and succeed in the film industry. He has also cited Jack O'Connell, Ben Mendelsohn, Barry Keoghan, Kristen Stewart, and Robert Pattinson as acting influences due to their "very unique, almost odd, approaches to the craft."

== Career ==
Prior to acting, Iqbal was a model for a short time. He gave up modelling due to struggles with the casting process. Iqbal acted in student films during his time with the Royal Exchange Theatre. He was in a short film named Why ME? in 2019, and had his feature film debut in the 2022 film All Crazy Random.

In 2023, it was announced Iqbal would star in the BBC Three series A Good Girl's Guide to Murder as Ravi opposite Emma Myers. He was described as the "perfect Ravi" by series author Holly Jackson, while executive producer Matthew Read described him as "brilliant." The six-part series was released on BBC Three in August 2024.

== Personal life ==
Iqbal currently lives in London. He has lived in Holborn, West London, and Hampstead.

In an interview with Vogue Singapore, Iqbal stated that he would like to play a villain or Batman. Outside of acting, Iqbal enjoys boxing.

== Filmography ==
=== Film ===
Year	Title	Role	Notes	Refs.
2019	Why ME?	Kyle	Short film	
2022	All Crazy Random	Boris		
TBD	Death, Whatever!	Mark	Post-production; Short film	

=== Television ===
Year	Title	Role	Notes	Refs.
2024–present	A Good Girl's Guide to Murder	Ravi Singh	Main role	
