= TikTok Book Awards =

Annual awards given to a works of fiction

- Date: 25 July 2024
- Country: United Kingdom and Ireland
- Presented by: TikTok
- First award: 2023; 3 years ago

The TikTok Book Awards, established in May 2023, are annual literary awards presented by TikTok, leveraging the success of its BookTok subcommunity. The awards are intended to "recognise the community's favourite authors, books and creators, through categories inspired by the BookTok ecosystem." An initial longlist is narrowed down by a judging panel with the winners ultimately decided by public vote within the app from the ensuing shortlist.

In 2023 the winners of the Book of the Year and Author of the Year categories received £5,000 to donate to a literary charity.

== Shortlisted nominees and winners ==
=== 2023 ===
Presented: 17 August 2023 in London.
| BookTok Book of the Year | BookTok Author of the Year | BookTok Creator of the Year |
|---|---|---|
| Honey & Spice by Bolu Babalola (Headline Review); Lies We Sing to the Sea by Sarah Underwood (Electric Monkey); Young Mungo by Douglas Stuart (Picador); Maame by Jessica George (Hodder & Stoughton) | Holly Jackson; Dr Suzie Edge; Lex Croucher; Bolu Babalola | Eden Victoria (@edenvictorria); @abbysbooks; @compulsivebookbuyers; @sivanreads |
| Indie Bookshop of the Year | Best BookTok Revival | Best Book to End A Reading Slump |
| Portobello Bookshop, Edinburgh; Chapters Bookstore, Dublin; The Feminist Bookshop, Brighton; Mr B's Emporium of Reading Delights, Bath | Pride & Prejudice by Jane Austen; One Day by David Nicholls (Hodder & Stoughton); Never Let Me Go by Kazuo Ishiguro (Faber & Faber); 1984 by George Orwell | Everything I know About Love by Dolly Alderton (Fig Tree); The Family Remains by Lisa Jewell (Century); My Sister, the Serial Killer by Oyinkan Braithwaite (Atlantic Books); The Silent Patient by Alex Michaelides (Orion) |
Best Book I Wish I Could Read Again For The First Time
Heartstopper: Volume One by Alice Oseman (Hodder Children's Books); Noughts and Crosses by Malorie Blackman (Penguin); Normal People by Sally Rooney (Faber & Faber); Open Water by Caleb Azumah Nelson (Viking)

=== 2024 ===
The new award for TikTok Shop Book of Year was based on "TikTok Shop sales data and the impact the book has had on TikTok" and was not decided by public vote.

Presented: 25 July 2024 in London.
| BookTok Book of the Year | BookTok Book of the Year (International) | BookTok Breakthrough Author |
|---|---|---|
| None of This is True by Lisa Jewell (Century); Gwen & Art Are Not in Love by Lex Croucher (Bloomsbury YA); Small Worlds by Caleb Azumah Nelson (Penguin); The Rachel Incident by Caroline O'Donoghue (Little, Brown Book Group) | Fourth Wing by Rebecca Yarros (Piatkus); Yellowface by R. F. Kuang (The Borough Press); Sword Catcher by Cassandra Clare (Tor); Chain-Gang All-Stars by Nana Kwame Adjei-Brenyah (Vintage) | Talia Hibbert; Ben Alderson; Martin Knights; Claire Wright |
| BookTok Creator of the Year | BookTok Rising Star Creator | Indie Bookshop of the Year |
| Maisie Matilda (@Maisie_Matilda); @zai_rambles; @cultofbooks; @literaryfling | John-Paul Kunrunmi (@JPreads6); @greendragonbooknooks; @fictionalfates; @booksonthebedside | The Bookshop by the Sea, Aberystwyth; Imaginarium Books, Lymington; The Little Bookshop, Skipton; House of Books & Friends, Manchester |
TikTok Shop Book of the Year
The Pumpkin Spice Café by Laurie Gilmore (HarperCollins)
