= A Good Girl's Guide to Murder (TV series) =

2024 British mystery thriller TV series

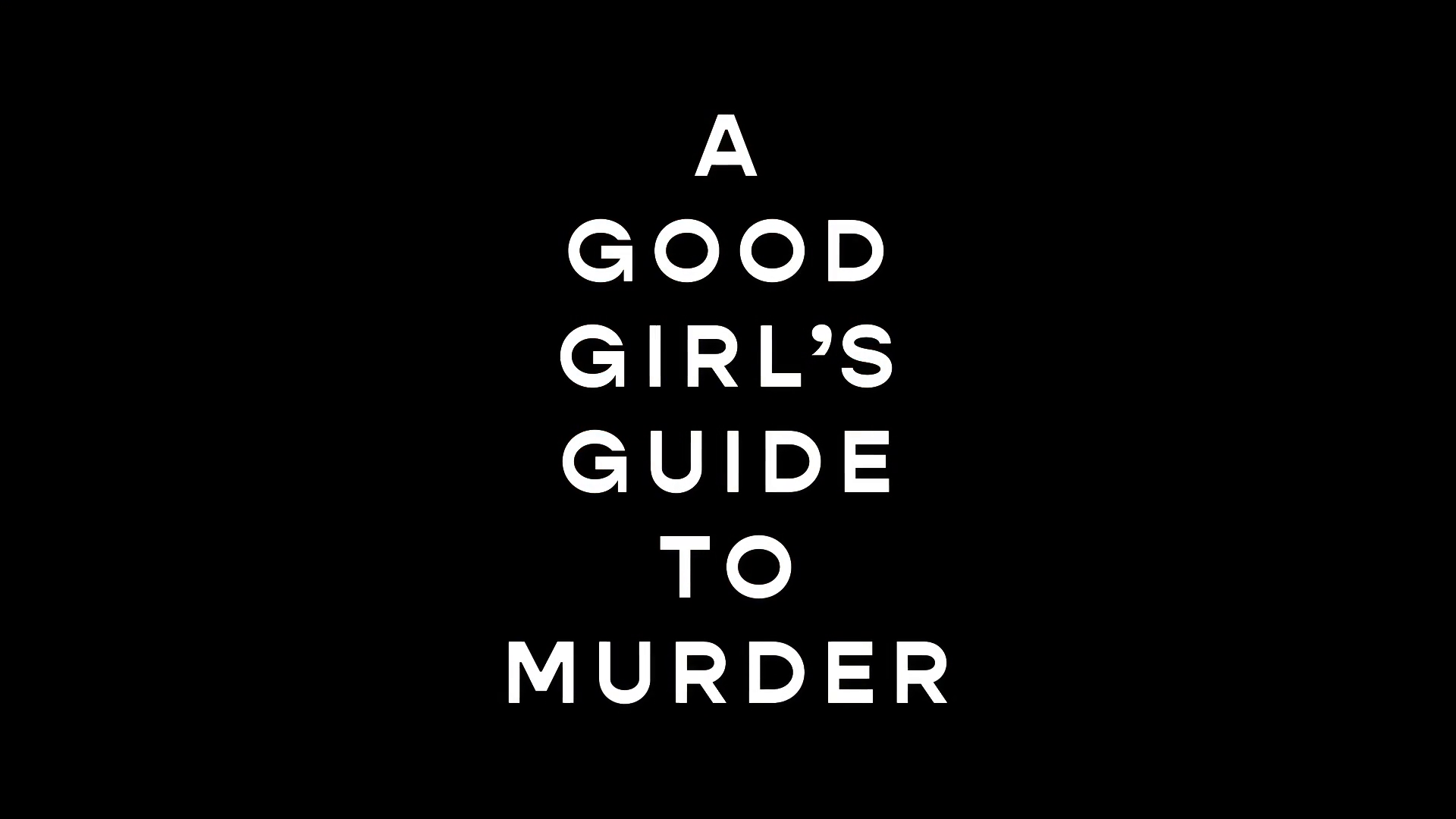
- Genre: Mystery thriller
- Created by: Holly Jackson; Poppy Cogan
- Based on: A Good Girl's Guide to Murder by Holly Jackson
- Written by: Poppy Cogan; Ruby Thomas; Zia Ahmed; Ajoke Ibironke; Holly Jackson
- Directed by: Dolly Wells; Tom Vaughan; Asim Abbasi; Jill Robertson
- Starring: Emma Myers; Zain Iqbal; Asha Banks; Raiko Gohara; Jude Morgan-Collie; Yali Topol Margalith; Yasmin Al-Khudhairi; Henry Ashton; Carla Woodcock; Mathew Baynton; Gary Beadle; Anna Maxwell Martin; Peter Sullivan
- Music by: Heather Christian
- Country of origin: United Kingdom
- Original language: English
- No. of series: 2
- No. of episodes: 12

Production
- Executive producers: Matthew Read; Matthew Bouch; Frith Tiplady; Holly Jackson; Poppy Cogan; Dolly Wells; Simon Crawford Collins; Asim Abbasi; Emma Myers
- Producers: Florence Walker; Sophie Klein; Sophie MacClancy
- Running time: 40–49 minutes
- Production companies: Moonage Pictures; ZDFneo

Original release
- Network: BBC iPlayer
- Release: 1 July 2024 – present

A Good Girl's Guide to Murder is a British mystery thriller television series based on the 2019 novel by Holly Jackson, adapted by Poppy Cogan, directed by Dolly Wells, and developed by Moonage Pictures and the German public broadcaster ZDFneo for BBC Three. The series, consisting of six episodes, covers events from the first book, and premiered on 1 July 2024 on BBC iPlayer in the United Kingdom, followed by its terrestrial premiere on BBC Three on 10 July. It was released internationally on Netflix on 1 August 2024.

The second series was released on 27 May 2026. A third and final series is set to premiere in 2027.

== Premise ==
Teenage sleuth Pippa "Pip" Fitz-Amobi (Emma Myers) is not satisfied with the police's handling of cases in her small English town, Little Kilton, and investigates, while producing her EPQ and podcast on it.

The first season revolves around the killing of Andie Bell, a student at Pippa "Pip" Fitz- Amobi's school. She was assumed to have been murdered by her boyfriend, Sal Singh, who seemingly confessed to the murder and committed suicide shortly after. Pip investigates further to clear Sal's name and gets closer to his brother, Ravi (Zain Iqbal), whose family was ostracized after Sal was accused of killing Andie.

The second season revolves around the disappearance of Pip's best friend Connor's brother, Jamie. Connor pleads with Pip to help in the search for Jamie, who was last seen at a memorial for Sal and Andie, a few days before he is to appear as a witness in court. Pip investigates and helps spread awareness about Jamie's disappearance through episodes of her podcast.

== Cast and characters ==
=== Main ===
- Emma Myers as Pippa "Pip" Fitz-Amobi
  - Kitty Anderson as young Pip
- Zain Iqbal as Ravi Singh, Sal's younger brother
- Asha Banks as Cara Ward, Pip's best friend
- Raiko Gohara as Zach Chen (season 1)
- Jude Morgan-Collie as Connor Reynolds
- Yali Topol Margalith as Lauren Gibson
- Yasmin Al-Khudhairi as Naomi Ward (season 1; guest season 2)
- Henry Ashton as Max Hastings
- Carla Woodcock as Becca Bell
- Mathew Baynton as Elliot Ward, Cara and Naomi's father (season 1)
- Gary Beadle as Victor Amobi, Pip's stepfather
- Anna Maxwell Martin as Leanne Amobi, Pip's mother
- Peter Sullivan as Christopher Epps (season 2)

=== Recurring ===
- India Lillie Davies as Andie Bell, Sal's girlfriend who was assumed to have been killed by him
- Rahul Pattni as Sal Singh, Ravi's older brother
- Jackson Bews as Dan Da Silva, a police officer and Nat's brother
- Kamari Loyd as Josh Amobi, Pip's younger brother
- Matthew Chambers as Jason Bell, Andie's father
- Annabel Mullion as Rosie Hastings
- Adam Astill as Toby Hastings
- Andy McLeod as DI Hawkins
- Jessica Webber as Nat Da Silva, a friend of Andie's
- Orla Hill as Ruby Foxcroft
- Thomas Gray as Howie Bowers, a local drug dealer
- Matthew Khan as Dylan (season 1)
- Oliver Wickham as Jesse Walker (season 1)
- Georgia Lock as Isla Jordan (season 1)
- Eden Hambelton Davies as Jamie Reynolds, Connor's brother (season 2)
- Lu Corfield as Joanna Reynolds (season 2)
- Jack Rowan as Charlie Green (season 2)
- Anna Brindle as Flora Green (season 2)
- Freddie England as Robin Hastings, Max's cousin (season 2)
- Oliver Coopersmith as Adam Clark, Pip's teacher (season 2)
- Misia Butler as Stanley Forbes (season 2)
- Freddie Thorp as Luke Eaton (season 2)

=== Guest ===
- Georgia Arron as Emma Hutton (season 1)
- Ephraim O.P. Sampson as Jake Lawrence (season 1)

== Episodes ==
=== Series overview ===
Series	Episodes	Originally released
1	6	1 July 2024
2	6	27 May 2026
3	4	2027

=== Series 1 (2024) ===
No. overall	No. in season	Title	Directed by	Written by	Original release date
1	1	"Episode 1"	Dolly Wells	Poppy Cogan	1 July 2024
Pippa 'Pip' Fitz-Amobi is entering her final year of school and hopes to go to university, and for the subject of her EPQ she decides to investigate the local 2019 disappearance of Andie Bell from five years earlier. A popular pupil, Andie was dating classmate Sal Singh when she disappeared, with police suspecting him of being responsible for her murder. Before he could be charged Sal allegedly confessed to killing Andie and then took his own life. However, Pip believes that Sal was innocent and is determined to find out the truth. After initially being rebuffed by Sal's brother Ravi, she begins her investigation by interviewing Sal's friend Naomi Ward, the older sister of Pip's best friend Cara, whose father Elliot is an English teacher at their school. Naomi reveals that Sal had an alibi for the night of Andie's disappearance, though doesn't elaborate after their conversation is interrupted. Following an interview with Sal's friend Max Hastings, who claims Naomi is lying to protect Sal, she approaches Ravi again. After she tells him that she believes Sal is innocent, Ravi shows Pip Sal's phone, indicating that someone else appears to have sent the confession text from his phone due to the difference in grammar.
2	2	"Episode 2"	Dolly Wells	Poppy Cogan	1 July 2024
Now working with Ravi, Pip turns her attention to Andie's two best friends, Emma Hutton and Nat Da Silva. Interviewing them, she finds out that Andie had a secret second, older boyfriend. Taking a break from the investigation, Pip goes camping with her friends Cara, Lauren, Zach, and Connor. During the trip she finds an anonymous warning left in her bed telling her to stop digging. Returning from the camping trip, Pip and Ravi deduce from Andie's social media photos that shortly before her disappearance, she and Nat had had a falling out, which they presume was related to nude photos of Nat having been leaked and suspect that Andie may have been responsible. Pip and Ravi confront Nat who denies hurting Andie and discloses that Andie was involved with Max. Pip goes back to interview Max, finding an intimate photo of Andie in his room, however he claims that he found it at school, that his relationship with Andie was not romantic, and that in fact Andie dealt drugs and he was one of her customers.
3	3	"Episode 3"	Dolly Wells	Ruby Thomas	1 July 2024
Pip decides that she must track down the drug dealer Andie was dealing for. To do so she must find the location of a Calamity party, an infamous secret teen party supposedly full of drugs and sex. Later, attending the party with her friends Cara and Lauren, she manages to find the drug dealer, who reveals that Andie kept a secret burner phone along with a drug stash in a stuffed rabbit. Afterwards Pip narrowly escapes an unwanted sexual encounter with another partygoer whom she'd misled during her undercover ruse. Back at home she receives a threatening text message that tells her to stop investigating. The next day an impromptu conversation with Andie's sister, Becca Bell, discourages her from continuing her investigation, but then deciding that she needs to find the rabbit and phone, Pip breaks into Andie and Becca's house with Ravi, where they are almost caught by Becca and Nat's brother, policeman Dan Da Silva.
4	4	"Episode 4"	Tom Vaughan	Zia Ahmed & Poppy Cogan	1 July 2024
Going through the stuffed rabbit that they stole from Andie's house, Pip and Ravi find a list of Andie's customers written out in code. Later that day, Pip also discovers that the customer list was written on a piece of paper from the Ivy House Hotel. Going to investigate, Pip steals the guest list from 2019 and during their escape, they discover that Andie stayed at the hotel when Pip recognises the floor from a selfie Andie took there. Pip determines that Andie stayed with her older boyfriend under the pseudonyms of Daisy Buchanan and Jay Gatsby. Pip attempts to call the number associated with the booking but finds that it is disconnected. The next day, on her way to school, Dan corners Pip, revealing that he knows it was she who broke into the Bell house and pressuring her to stop investigating — even going so far as to show her a video of Sal getting aggressive during a police interview. Unsure of the meaning of the video, Pip wonders if Sal did commit the murder. She remembers seeing Sal and Andie the day before Andie disappeared, with Sal asking Pip if she had seen Andie, when Andie wanted to be left alone. After an argument with Ravi, Pip returns to Cara's house, where Naomi gives Pip access to her laptop before leaving for the 2019 class reunion. On the laptop, Pip finds screenshots from Max Hastings's alternate Instagram account proving Sal's alibi: he had, in fact, been with his friends until after midnight on the night of Andie's disappearance. Pip then goes to find Naomi to ask her why she, Max, and Jake Lawrence had lied to the police saying that Sal left their hangout to go find Andie at 10:30 that night.
5	5	"Episode 5"	Tom Vaughan	Poppy Cogan & Ajoke Ibironke	1 July 2024
At the 2019 class reunion party, Naomi reveals to Pip that she, Max, and Jake were involved in a drunk driving collision on New Year's Day 2019. Max, the driver, had called someone to have it covered up. Naomi further reveals that someone had blackmailed the three of them into lying to the police in order to implicate Sal. Later that night, Pip receives further threatening text messages. Attempting to goad the killer, she makes a video claiming that she has proof Sal is innocent. However, the next day, during a family birthday party, Pip's dog Barney is killed. Distraught, Pip realises that Max must have called Dan after the accident. When Pip confronts Dan at the police station, he admits that he committed statutory rape against a 15-year-old Andie, two years before her death, and that Max was blackmailing him. The next day at school, Pip gets a call from Andie's secret older boyfriend's number. When Pip answers, it turns out to be Naomi using her father Elliot's old phone. After getting picked up by Elliot for a movie night with Cara, Pip deliberately leaves her phone in the car so she can track it with her laptop. She then discovers that Elliot printed the message telling her to stop digging, and sees that Elliot has gone to the old Ward family home, which they moved out of years earlier. After notifying Ravi where she is going, she goes to the house and confronts Elliot. He confesses that he had an inappropriate romantic relationship with Andie, which ended when she started dating Sal. Elliot further reveals that months later, Andie approached him and tried to blackmail him for money. Refusing to pay her, they fought, and Andie fell and hit her head on the counter. He then went to call an ambulance, but when he came back, she was gone. After finishing his story, Pip hears a tapping coming from the pipes. Assuming it is Andie, Pip races up to the attic to discover a woman bearing a striking resemblance to Andie. Elliot closes the door to the attic, trapping Pip inside.
6	6	"Episode 6"	Tom Vaughan	Poppy Cogan	1 July 2024
The young woman in the attic, Isla, tells Pip she had been homeless when Elliot offered to let her stay at the house. That evening, he confessed to her that he murdered Sal to prevent the police from investigating him for Andie's disappearance. Elliot lured Sal into the woods, then drugged and killed him before sending the false confession using Sal's phone. He then kept Isla trapped in the house for the next five years. The police arrest Elliot, though he still denies having killed Andie. Realising that Elliot could not have been the one who abducted Barney, Pip confronts him at the police station, and he reveals that he blackmailed Naomi and her friends, having learned about the hit-and-run from reading Naomi's diary. Elliot also shares that he believes Andie wanted money because she wanted to run away from her abusive father, Jason. Pip learns from Jesse, an employee at Jason's recycling plant, that Andie's sister Becca was once drugged with Rohypnol and raped at a Calamity party; Pip deduces that Max used the Rohypnol he bought from Andie to sexually assault Becca. Becca tells Pip that Andie dissuaded her from reporting the assault to the police because it would implicate Andie as Max's drug dealer. Upon learning that Andie had been planning to run away from home, Becca, feeling abandoned, pushed Andie, who was already injured from her struggle with Elliot, and killed her. Becca takes Pip to where she hid Andie's body in a septic tank, before revealing that she drugged Pip's tea with Rohypnol and intends to kill her too, but Ravi and Cara arrive just in time, and the police apprehend Becca. A flashback reveals that, on the day Andie went missing, Sal had been looking for her so that he could support her plans to run away from home. Pip and Ravi ultimately confess their feelings for each other.

=== Series 2 (2026) ===
No. overall	No. in season	Title	Directed by	Written by	Original release date
7	1	"Episode 1"	Asim Abbasi	Holly Jackson	27 May 2026
In a flashforward, a devastated Pip attempts CPR on an unknown person. Pip records for her podcast, but is conflicted over publishing it due to the effect it will have on those involved, especially Cara. She, Ravi, and their friends attend Connor's murder mystery themed birthday party, where his brother Jamie acts strangely and yells at Pip when he believes she is looking through his phone. Becca Bell refuses to testify against Max, and Pip becomes determined to change her mind. Whilst visiting the police station, Pip snoops through Max's case files and discovers Jamie is also a witness in the case. Jamie admits he is the prosecution's key witness, as one of the only people who knows 'Woman A' personally. At the woman's prison, Pip begs Becca to testify, but Becca tearfully refuses, instead breaking down and repeatedly apologising for hurting her. Pip forgives Becca and vows to still have Max found guilty; the pair hug before Pip is forcefully ejected by staff. Becca later renounces her decision and decides to testify. Tension forms in Pip's friend group when Lauren begins dating Robin Hastings, Max's cousin, and Cara becomes ostracised at school due to her father's actions. Pip receives two threatening messages, one of which asks her to meet during Ravi's speech at a memorial for Sal and Andie. The author is revealed to be Max, although he claims to have only sent one message, and he threatens Pip to prevent her from testifying against him. Pip picks up a high and intoxicated Cara from a Calamity party, where Cara blames her for encouraging hatred against her by publishing her podcast. The following day, Connor asks Pip for help, as Jamie has disappeared.
8	2	"Episode 2"	Jill Robertson	Poppy Cogan	27 May 2026
Pip refuses to help Connor, but ultimately reports Jamie's disappearance to DI Hawkins under the belief Max is behind it. Hawkins is sceptical, but Dan Da Silva secretly expresses support. Ravi encourages Pip to help Connor, and she organises their friend group to put up missing posters. Here, she questions Robin about Max and convinces him to help her find his whereabouts on the night Jamie disappeared. Ravi and Pip investigate the golf course Max claims to have been, where they meet security guard Stanley Forbes. Pip discovers that Max was not lying, to her frustration. Connor admits he caught Jamie stealing money from their mother due to a "life or death" situation, and that Jamie has feelings for Nat Da Silva. They discover a bracelet and a note in Jamie's room with the name "Hillary Weiseman" who died sixty years prior. Pip continues to receive threatening messages, although now they are telling her to stop investigating Jamie. Pip learns that Nat and Jamie had an argument at the memorial, so visits her and her boyfriend Luke, but they both claim that she no longer speaks to Jamie. Nat later admits to arguing with Jamie due to her belief that he had become readdicted to drugs, and insists he has to be found before the court date the next day. Becca testifies against Max, but the defence discredits her due to her blacking out on the night, and being in jail for manslaughter. Pip's neighbours, Charlie and Flora, show her doorcam footage they captured of Jamie breaking into their house, with the only thing missing being Flora's bracelet, which Pip and Connor found in Jamie's room.
9	3	"Episode 3"	Jill Robertson	Poppy Cogan	27 May 2026
Pip testifies in court against Max, but is unable to display her phone call due to her decision to remove mentions of the hit and run, making it inadmissible in court. The defence scrutinise Pip for her prior behaviour to Max during her investigation of Andie, causing an outburst by Pip that only serves to help Max. She privately threatens to release the edited recording, but Max dismisses her. Connor's mother finds a bloodied sweater hidden under Jamie's bed and a knife is missing from their kitchen. Connor pretends to be a customer to the newly released Howie Bowers, where they see Stanley Forbes talking to Howie. Howie attacks Connor after realising he is recording. Pip and Ravi intervene, where Howie reveals that he has not seen Jamie for months and Cara owes him money for MDMA. Max convinces Robin to help him remove the recording on Pip's phone, but his actions cause his mother, Rosie, to become doubtful of his innocence. Pip forcibly takes the MDMA from Cara, and discovers Jamie's phone charger in her pocket, causing an argument between the pair. On her podcast, Pip asks for footage of the Calamity Party, finding proof that Jamie was there and meeting with Ruby. Woman A testifies, and is revealed to be Nat, who states she was also drugged and raped by Max. Pip flees detention to question Ruby, who reveals she did not know Jamie, he mistook her for someone named Layla. Pip deduces that someone was catfishing Jamie with Ruby's pictures. Ravi, Connor, and Pip make a fake dating profile and find the account, discovering her posts have been liked by their English teacher Mr Clarke. Ravi gets fired from his internship, as Max threatened would happen if Pip were to testify. Lauren and Robin arrive to help, where Robin is caught attempting to steal Pip's phone. Layla replies to their fake account addressing Pip directly and taunting her about being close to the truth.
10	4	"Episode 4"	Jill Robertson	Holly Jackson	27 May 2026
Layla deletes her account, so the trio investigate the graveyard for answers, there they find Hillary's grave. Following the instructions on Jamie's note, they find a coded message from Jamie to Layla filled with money. Stanley Forbes discovers them, stating that Max forced him to fabricate the alibi and that Max was not at the golf course that night. Rosie finds Max's roofies and angrily disowns him, refusing to be his character witness. Pip asks Dan about his suspicions surrounding Max, upon which Dan admits that the blood on Jamie's jumper is his. Pip panics, believing Dan killed Jamie, but Dan insists that Max had blackmailed him into intimidating Jamie, so he would revoke his testimony, but Jamie had refused and injured him. Pip informs Dan that Nat is Woman A, causing him to agree to help Pip. Dan claims to have been sent to escort Max, but instead kidnaps him and attempts to force him to confess to doctoring his alibi. Max claims he was buying drugs from Howie and also saw Jamie walking, wearing a different outfit. Connor and Pip find the clothing Max claimed Jamie was wearing is missing and manage to break into Jamie's laptop, discovering he walked about 1,000 steps after Max supposedly saw him. Max offers to plead guilty to reconcile with Rosie, but on the stand instead claims that Sal Singh was the rapist. Pip interrogates Mr Clarke, who recounts that he spoke to Layla on the phone and she questioned him about his family and claimed to have an inoperable brain tumor. Pip hosts a search party for Jamie, convincing Jason to allow them to search his recycling plant. The group find the missing knife at an abandoned manor house.
11	5	"Episode 5"	Jill Robertson	Holly Jackson	27 May 2026
Connor, Ravi, and Pip return to the house at night, where they eavesdrop on Howie Bowers making a deal with an unknown man. They chase the man in Pip's car, but she spins out of control, injuring Connor and upsetting Ravi. Pip identifies the car as Luke's, but Nat refuses to speak to her. Max is found not guilty, and Pip returns to comfort the distraught Nat. Pip physically attacks Robin after he insists on Max's innocence and taunts her, resulting in her suspension. Pip argues with her parents and Ravi, blaming herself for the verdict. A dead body is found, believed to be Jamie, prompting Pip to go to Charlie, who tells her that Max has not won yet. Pip publishes a podcast episode with the edited recording of their phone call, before vandalising his house. Pip reconciles with Ravi, and the pair go to question Luke. Nat, motivated by Pip's actions, leaves Luke and tells Pip about what Jamie would have testified, she also reveals that Luke met Layla the day Jamie disappeared. Luke reveals he gave Jamie the money they found at the grave, and that Jamie is Layla, who told Luke "child brown sick" before running away. Pip and Ravi realise that Jamie said Child Brunswick, the 10-year-old son of a serial killer who was helping his father but ultimately testified against him, who matches the description and age of Layla's catfish victims. They theorise that Layla recruited Jamie to find Child Brunswick, and his strange actions were because Layla was testing how far Jamie would go for her. Connor discovers that Child Brunswick once told his girlfriend his true identity, resulting in him having to be given a new identity, and later that someone claimed they knew Child Brunswick was in Little Kilton as a former cellmate was friends with him. A person using the same texting style as Layla replied, interested. Believing this former cellmate to be Howie, the trio leave to meet him, when Pip suddenly realises that Stanley Forbes is Child Brunswick.
12	6	"Episode 6"	Asim Abbasi	Holly Jackson	27 May 2026
Pip refuses to involve the police, not trusting them, and the trio decide to lure Stanley out by pretending to be Layla, allowing Connor and Ravi to break into his house. Pip recruits Cara to keep lookout with her, although their friendship is still strained. Pip reveals herself to Stanley, who agrees to talk to her, he divulges that Layla asked to meet at the manor house, but Jamie was there and attempted to kill him with a knife after Stanley reacted to the name Child Brunswick. Ravi and Connor discover Jamie still alive inside Stanley's house. Jamie begs Connor to leave him there, insisting he is alright and needs to stay. Stanley reveals he has been holding Jamie hostage, unsure if Jamie was actually Layla, but the both of them came to an understanding. Cara goes to help Pip, but is taken at gunpoint by Charlie, who reveals he and Flora are the real Layla, intending to avenge his murdered twin sister. Charlie angrily confronts Stanley, but Pip calls 999 on Howie's burner phone, distracting Charlie and allowing her and Cara to escape. Pip returns to save Stanley, but Charlie refuses, comparing the situation to Pip and Max; he shoots Stanley numerous times before setting the building on fire. Pip drags Stanley out of the building, performing CPR after he falls unconscious, refusing to stop even after Dan arrives to help. Charlie and Flora escape, and Pip repeatedly experiences vivid flashbacks to Stanley's death. At the funeral, Pip and Jamie discuss Stanley and he reassures her that Charlie was wrong. Pip has a panic attack during her speech after seeing vandalism calling Stanley a murderer. Nat and Jamie begin dating, whilst Cara and Pip mend their relationship. Pip returns home to find threatening messages on her laptop.

=== Series 3 (2027) ===
No. overall	No. in season	Title	Directed by	Written by	Original release date
13	1	"Episode 1"	TBD	Holly Jackson	2027
14	2	"Episode 2"	TBD	TBD	2027
15	3	"Episode 3"	TBD	TBD	2027
16	4	"Episode 4"	TBD	TBD	2027

== Production ==
In September 2022, the project was announced as a BBC Three television adaptation of the Holly Jackson novel A Good Girl's Guide to Murder, produced by Moonage Pictures. Dolly Wells is a director on the project from a script by Poppy Cogan, alongside Zia Ahmed, Ajoke Ibironke, and Ruby Thomas. It is produced by Florence Walker, and executive producers include Matthew Read, Matthew Bouch and Frith Tiplady for Moonage Pictures, and Lucy Richer and Danielle Scott-Haughton for the BBC, along with Wells, Holly Jackson, and Cogan.

Despite the executive producer Frith Tiplady stressing that the first series has a real end, it was renewed for a second series on 20 November 2024, which adapts the second book, Good Girl, Bad Blood. Jackson and Cogan returned to write the screenplay while Myers and Iqbal reprised their respective roles. In June 2026, a third and final series was confirmed to have already been filmed, which will adapt the third book, As Good As Dead.

=== Casting ===
In June 2023, production started with Emma Myers and Zain Iqbal cast into the lead roles of Pip and Ravi.

=== Filming ===
Filming took place around Bristol and Somerset. Locations include the Redcliffe Caves, the Avon Valley Railway car park, Redland, Redmaids' High School, Westbury-on-Trym, and Axbridge. Filming for the second series took place in the final week of April 2025 in Axbridge, Somerset.

== Release ==
A Good Girl's Guide to Murder premiered on 1 July 2024 on BBC iPlayer in the United Kingdom and in Ireland, Stan in Australia, and ThreeNow in New Zealand. A terrestrial broadcast on BBC Three began on 10 July 2024, with two episodes being broadcast per week. The series was released in Germany on 30 August 2024 on the ZDFmediathek service, while ZDFneo broadcast two episodes per week beginning from 8 September 2024. The series was released on Netflix on 1 August 2024.

The second series was released on BBC iPlayer and ZDFmediathek on 27 May 2026. The third and final series is set to be released in 2027.

== Reception ==
On the review aggregator website Rotten Tomatoes, 83% of 41 critics' reviews are positive, with an average rating of 6.4/10. The website's consensus reads: "A frothy series that carries off the classic murder mystery with a light touch, A Good Girl's Guide to Murder's checks all the boxes for a sweetly satisfying binge." Metacritic, which uses a weighted average, assigned a score of 69 out of 100, based on 20 critics, indicating "generally favorable" reviews.

For the second series, 92% of 13 critics' reviews on Rotten Tomatoes are positive, with an average rating of 7.5/10. The website's consensus reads: "A Good Girl's Guide to Murder returns for a darker, more narratively rich season two, weaving a new web of intrigue that Emma Myers embraces with aplomb."
