= Lisa Williamson =

Lisa Williamson may refer to:

- Lisa Williamson, actress who played the character Dawn Cunningham in the British soap opera Hollyoaks
- Lisa Williamson (writer) (born 1980), British writer
- Lisa Williamson (One Life to Live), a fictional character in the American soap opera One Life to Live
- Sister Souljah (Lisa Williamson, born 1964), American author, rapper and activist
