= Five Survive =

Novel by Holly Jackson

- Author: Holly Jackson
- Language: English
- Genre: Thriller
- Publisher: Electric Monkey (UK); Delacorte Press (US)
- Publication date: 29 November 2022
- Publication place: United Kingdom; United States

Five Survive is a thriller novel by Holly Jackson published by Electric Monkey in the United Kingdom and by Delacorte Press in the United States. The book came out 29 November 2022 and is the author's first standalone novel. Holly Jackson is the bestselling author of the A Good Girl's Guide To Murder series. Five Survive reached number one in the New York Times Young Adult Hardcover Bestseller list.

== Plot summary ==
Five Survive follows six high school seniors going on a road trip during their spring break. 18 year old Red Kenny, the protagonist, joins her friends on a journey in a borrowed RV, hoping to find some normalcy and fun after experiencing personal challenges, including the death of her mother. Red is accompanied by her best friend Maddy, Maddy's brother Oliver, Reyna, and their friends Simon and Arthur. As they drive through a desolate part of South Carolina, a series of unexpected events turns their holiday into a nightmare. The trouble begins when the group takes a wrong turn and ends up on a desolate road far from their planned route.

First, the RV gets a flat tire in the middle of nowhere, leaving them stranded without a way to call for help due to poor reception. They think they have just hit a sharp rock and while they attempt to fix it, they discover that the damage appears intentional, as if someone had purposely sabotaged their vehicle. While outside of the vehicle trying to make sense of what happened to the tires, Red sees something out of the ordinary. A small red dot is moving slowly against the RV, coming from somewhere in the forest. Before they can make sense of this, they find themselves under attack. Someone is shooting at the RV from the darkness. The sniper hits the fuel tank, and they are left deserted on the road.

Panic sets in as they realize they are being targeted. Suddenly an unfamiliar voice comes through a hidden walkie-talkie, revealing that someone is out there with a sniper rifle, and they are not just stranded by chance. The sniper gives them a chilling ultimatum. One of the six holds a secret, and until that secret is revealed, they will not be allowed to leave. They must find the truth within the group or none of them will survive.

At first, the group is in disbelief, thinking it's some sort of sick joke or misunderstanding. But when the sniper proves his deadly seriousness by shooting objects near them, their fears are confirmed. Trapped and surrounded, the group of teens are forced to take the sniper's demands seriously. They realize the sniper knows intimate details about them and is willing to kill if they do not comply. The group becomes frantic, searching for the secret that could save their lives.

Oliver quickly takes charge. As they start to turn on each other, it becomes apparent that there are fractures within their friend group that the sniper is making use of. The claustrophobic atmosphere of the RV, combined with the terror of being hunted, pushes everyone to their breaking points.

With the clock ticking, the group tries to escape multiple times, but every plan fails. The sniper's aim is too good and every failed attempt makes them more desperate. As their fear grows, secrets begin to spill out. Oliver and Maddy's mom, Catherine, is an assistant district attorney who is involved in a case against a member of the Philadelphia mafia, Frank Grotti. Oliver believes the secret could have something to do with the case.

Oliver's secret is that he beat up a man who was looking at his girlfriend, Reyna, and left him injured, with a serious brain injury. Reyna reveals that she knew the man who was killed and was having an affair with him, while she was dating Oliver, which enrages him.

Simon's secret is that he has helped his uncle steal cars, and the vehicle in which they were travelling was, in fact, a stolen van.

Oliver starts accusing Red and Arthur of working with the sniper. Red then realizes that there is a chance that she is the one the sniper is after. Red reveals that she herself is an eyewitness in the Frank Gotti case. Oliver quickly decides that Red must be the one the sniper is after. He forces her out of the RV into the darkness.

The sniper does not shoot and Red survives. This makes Oliver suspicious of her involvement with the sniper. Oliver then decides to have his sister Maddy pretend to be Red and get outside of the RV. Because of Oliver's plan, Maddy gets shot in the leg by the sniper.

After that, Red manages to get through radio interference on the walkie-talkie but then Arthur abruptly smashes it. Red then admits that she hasn't been telling the truth and Catherine, Oliver and Maddy's mom made her lie. Red isn't actually the eyewitness. Catherine had promised to give Red money for the false account.

Red had assumed that Frank Gotti was the one that killed her mom, because of the similar manner in which she and the recent victim were killed. Catherine stood to gain a lot from the trial. When she won, she would be the top candidate for District Attorney. However, as soon as the signed Red up for the deal, she sold out her name, under the title of her coworker, Mo Frazer, who was the only other contender that could possibly beat her at elections.

She made sure to leave a trace the police could follow aroind the information leak, so that he would get arrested, and she would, also in this scenario, win her position.

It is revealed that the sniper outside of the RV is Arthur's brother and that they are Frank Gotti's sons. Arthur then confesses that Frank did not kill Red's mom at all. That's when Red finally realizes that Catherine had made up a story and lied to her. The one who killed Red's mom was Catherine. Maddy then speaks up, admitting that she already knew that her mom Catherine was responsible for Red's mother's death.

Finally a police car arrives at the scene. Red rushes out of the RV and Arthur runs after her. Oliver also follows close behind, intent on killing Arthur. In the chaos Red gets shot by a police officer since she accidentally thought that the walkie-talkie in her hand was a gun and Oliver gets shot by the sniper. The last part of the book includes a newsletter, a police radio transcript and a letter from Arthur to Red where it is revealed that Red survived.

== Development ==
Holly Jackson said that "after the A Good Girl's Guide to Murder series, I wanted to write the most different kind of crime thriller I could, almost as a palate cleanser. And I have always wanted to write a book in real time, the entire story unfolding in the same amount of time it takes to read it."

== Literary significance and reception ==
Kirkus Reviews stated that Five Survive has "Intervals of intense suspense and a well-crafted puzzle blend to create a thrill ride of a story". A reviewer on Bookgeeks gave a mixed review, noting that at times "the suspense felt prolonged and unnecessary, particularly at the beginning" but at the same time there were moments in the story that will completely get you off guard: "The author skilfully leads you to think you have it all figured out when, in reality, the truth lies far from your assumptions."

== Awards and nominations ==
Winner of the 2022 Crimefest Award for Best Crime Fiction Novel for Young Adults.

Nominated in a Goodreads Choice Award for Reader's Favorite Young Adult Fiction (2023).
