= Josh Silver (author) =

British author (born 1989)

- Silver in 2026
- Education: RADA (2012) King's College London (2022)
- Occupations: Author, actor, nurse
- Writing career
- Genres: Literary fiction, Contemporary, Queer, Psychological Thriller, Satire, YA Fiction, Dystopia
- Subjects: Mental health, LGBTQI+, addiction

Josh Silver (born 15 September 1989) is a British author and former actor and mental health nurse. He is best known for his debut adult novel, Fruit Fly (2026), a literary satire and psychological thriller exploring authorship, appropriation, addiction and identity. The novel was named a must-read book of 2026 by the BBC and became a New York Times, Sunday Times and USA Today bestseller.Its television rights were acquired by A24, with Silver attached as an executive producer.

Silver began his writing career in young adult fiction. HappyHead (2023), was shortlisted for the YA Book Prize and nominated for the Carnegie Medal for Writing. His third young adult novel, Traumaland (2025), won the 2026 YA Book Prize and was published in the United States under the title Erase Me.

== Biography ==
Silver grew up on a farm in the Lake District and moved to Manchester when he was a teenager. He attended RADA at the age of 18. After appearing on Broadway (the Royal Shakespeare Company's adaptation of the Hilary Mantel books Wolf Hall and Bring up the Bodies), and in the West End (notably alongside Nicole Kidman in Photograph 51), he later retrained as a mental health nurse and began writing at the same time. He is an identical twin.

== Bibliography ==
- —— (2023). HappyHead. Rock the Boat.
- —— (2024). Dead Happy. Rock the Boat.
- —— (2025). Traumaland. Rock the Boat.
- —— (2026). Fruit Fly. Magpie.

== Awards and accolades ==
Title	Year	Award	Result
TraumaLand / Erase Me	2026	YA Book Prize	Winner
TraumaLand / Erase Me	2025	A Waterstones YA Book of the Year	Named
TraumaLand / Erase Me	2026	Carnegie Medal for Writing	Nominated
TraumaLand / Erase Me	2025	The Observer Best YA books of 2025	Named
HappyHead	2024	YA Book Prize	Shortlisted
HappyHead	2024	Carnegie Medal for Writing	Nominated
HappyHead	2023	Amazon YA Book of the Year	Named
HappyHead	2025	Massachusetts Teen Choice Award	Shortlisted
HappyHead	2023	Irish Independent on Sunday Book of the Year	Named
