= Lex Croucher =

English author and YouTuber (born 1992)

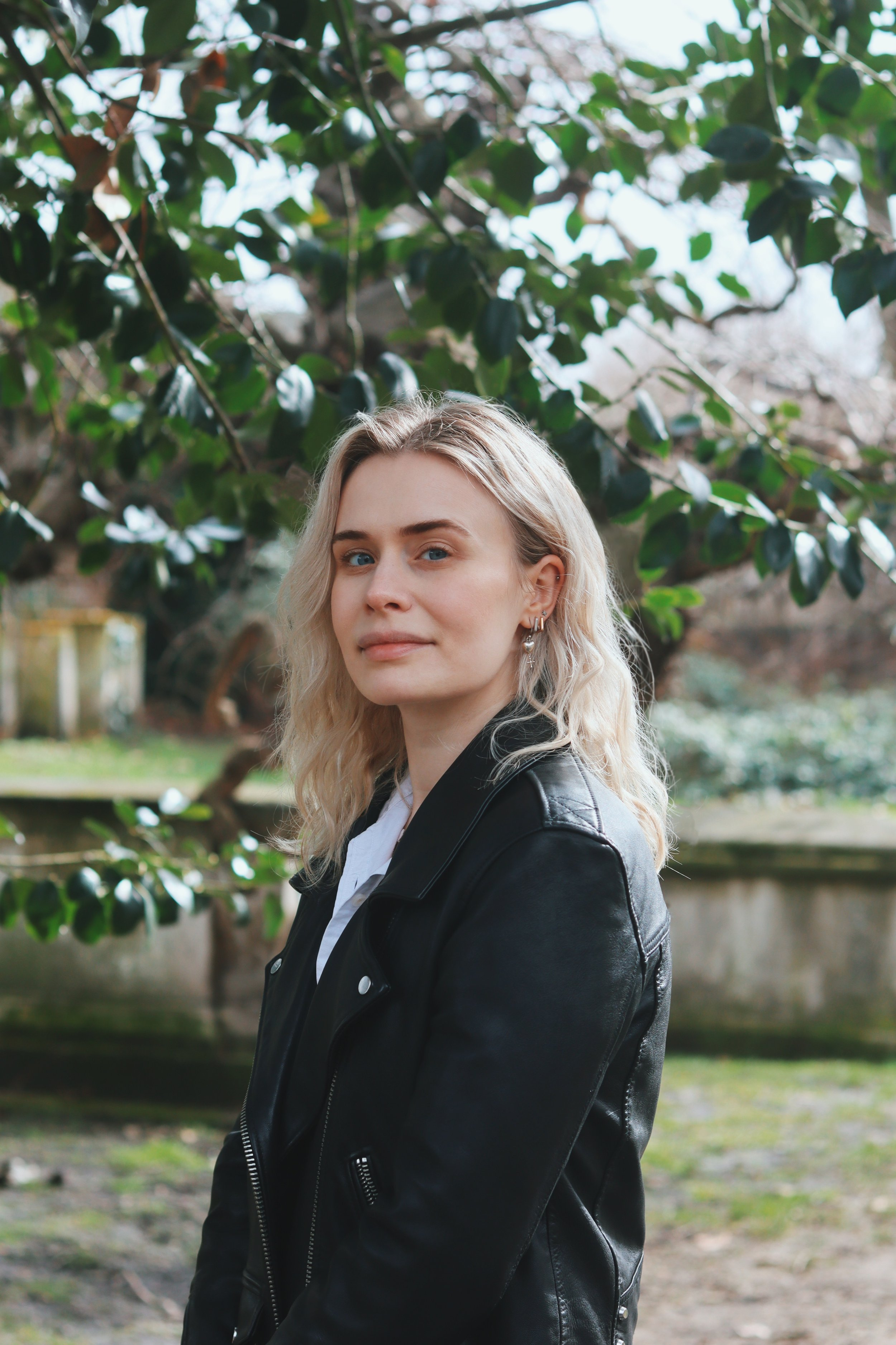
- Croucher in 2023
- Born: 8 March 1992 (age 34)
- Education: University of Southampton

YouTube information
- Channel: Lex Croucher
- Years active: 2008–present
- Website: lexcroucher.co.uk

Lex Croucher (born 8 March 1992) is an English author and YouTuber. Croucher began their career on YouTube before going into writing with their debut non-fiction book You're Crushing It (2019) and novel Reputation (2021). Their Arthurian novel Gwen & Art Are Not in Love (2023) won the 2024 YA Book Prize among other accolades.

== Early life and education ==
Croucher grew up in Surrey. They graduated from the University of Southampton with a degree in English.

== Career ==
=== YouTube ===
Having done some BlogTV shows and discovered AmazingPhil through MySpace, Croucher created their YouTube channel under the username tyrannosauruslexxx on 2 June 2008. Also inspired by fiveawesomegirls, charlieissocoollike, and John Green, Croucher used their phone camera to film videos. In 2011, Croucher won Google's NextUp grant, which allowed them to buy a video camera, laptop, and editing equipment, and to go to VidCon. By 2013, Croucher had over 60 thousand subscribers, and their content shifted from autobiographical vlogs towards advice and opinion pieces. As of September 2020, Croucher's main channel had over 120 thousand subscribers. Croucher has been on an indefinite hiatus from YouTube since 2021.

In addition, Croucher created the side channels lexcanroar in 2008, featuring mostly vlogs, and girlyashell, featuring beauty content. From 2011 to 2014, Croucher was a member of the collaboration channel Sarcaschicks.

At both Summer in the City (SitC) and VidCon, Croucher co-founded and chaired the Women on YouTube panel from 2012, discussing the experiences of women creators in an online space. The SitC 2015 panel included Cherry Wallis, Theadora Lee, Dodie Clark, Laci Green, Lucy Moon, and Jana Damanhouri.

Due to their sex education-related videos, in 2014, Croucher was invited to appear on the BBC Two programme Newsnight to discuss the new NICE guidelines around the morning-after pill.

In 2017 and 2018, Croucher hosted an advice podcast with fellow YouTuber Rosianna Halse Rojas titled Make Out With Him, with a focus on dating and relationships.

=== Writing ===
After graduating from university, Croucher contributed to HuffPost UK and had a WordPress-based blog.

Croucher began their professional writing career with You're Crushing It: Positivity for Living Your Real Life, a non-fiction self-help guide aimed at teenagers published by Bloomsbury Children' Books in 2019.

In September 2019, shortly after Croucher first spoke of it on at SitC, Zaffre (a Bonnier Books imprint) picked up the rights to publish Croucher's debut fiction novel Reputation, a Regency-era romantic comedy, in July 2021, billed as Mean Girls meets Jane Austen. Zaffre acquired the rights to two further Regency novels from Croucher in February 2022: Infamous, published 21 July 2022, and Trouble, published a year later. The former had a US release via St. Martin's Press in March 2023. Croucher was nominated for the 2023 TikTok Book Award for Author of the Year.

Also in 2023, Croucher released their first young adult novel Gwen & Art Are Not in Love via Bloomsbury UK in the UK and Commonwealth and Wednesday Books (a St. Martin's Press imprint) in the US; both publishers had acquired the rights in 2021. The Arthurian Camelot-set novel centres on the arranged betrothal between a lesbian princess and a gay duke. Croucher told The Bookseller: "I wanted it to be absolutely over-the-top ridiculous, funny, escapist; full of things like flirty sword fights and terrible puns". Gwen & Art Are Not in Love won the 2024 YA Book Prize and the 2023 Books Are In My Bag Readers' Award for Young Adult Fiction. It was also shortlisted for an inaugural Nero Book Award, a Barnes & Noble Award, a Polari Prize, and another TikTok Book Award, and longlisted for the Branford Boase Award. The sequel, Bridget & Gabe Are Not Okay, was released in August 2026.

Croucher released their second YA medieval romance Not For the Faint of Heart, a Robin Hood reimagining, with Bloomsbury UK. In March 2024, Croucher signed a two-standalone book deal with Gollancz (an Orion Publishing Group imprint), which won a 10-way bidding war for the rights to The Unmagical Life of Briar Jones, a fantasy novel.

== Philanthropy and activism ==
As part of their YouTube career, Croucher traveled to Syria with the charity Save the Children.

In 2015, Croucher started an online petition calling on Sea Life London Aquarium to improve its penguins' living conditions, which garnered media attention and over 100 thousand signatures.

In April 2020, Croucher presented a video for Greenpeace's channel and website titled Do hashtags and petitions actually work?; in the video, Croucher discusses the effectiveness of online activism (via petitions, social media, and hashtags) and the term slacktivist.

In 2020, Croucher added their name to an open letter from The Second Shelf, a feminist bookstore, showing their support for the transgender and non-binary community, along with over 200 other authors.

== Personal life ==
Croucher lives in London. In 2020, Croucher came out as non-binary via Twitter, which they elaborated on in a YouTube video.

== Bibliography ==
=== The Camelot Disasters ===
- Gwen & Art Are Not in Love (2023)
- Bridget & Gabe Are Not Okay (2026)

=== Non-fiction ===
- You're Crushing It: Positivity for Living Your REAL Life (2019)

=== Adult standalone ===
- Reputation (2021)
- Infamous (2022)
- Trouble (2023)
- The Unmagical Life of Briar Jones (2026)

=== Young adult standalone ===
- Not for the Faint of Heart (2024)

== Accolades ==
Year	Title	Award	Category	Result	Ref.
2023	—	TikTok Book Awards	Author of the Year	Shortlisted	
2023	Gwen & Art Are Not in Love	Books Are My Bag Readers' Awards	Young Adult Fiction	Won	
2023	Gwen & Art Are Not in Love	Nero Book Awards	Children's Fiction	Shortlisted	
2024	Gwen & Art Are Not in Love	Branford Boase Award	—	Longlisted	
2024	Gwen & Art Are Not in Love	Barnes & Noble Children's and YA Awards	Young Adult	Shortlisted	
2024	Gwen & Art Are Not in Love	TikTok Book Awards	Book of the Year	Shortlisted	
2024	Gwen & Art Are Not in Love	YA Book Prize	—	Won	
2024	Gwen & Art Are Not in Love	Polari Prize	Children's and YA	Shortlisted	
