= Not Quite Dead Yet =

2025 novel by Holly Jackson

- British first edition hardback cover
- Author: Holly Jackson
- Cover artist: Erin Shappell
- Language: English
- Genre: Mystery, thriller
- Publisher: Penguin Books (UK); Ballantine Books (US)
- Publication date: 17 July 2025
- Pages: 448
- ISBN: 9780241753682

Not Quite Dead Yet is a 2025 mystery thriller novel by British author Holly Jackson. It was published by Penguin Books in the United Kingdom and by Ballantine Books in the United States. It won a Goodreads Choice Award in the Readers' Favorite Mystery & Thriller category. It is Jackson's debut adult thriller novel.

== Development ==
The idea of the novel came to Jackson while she was writing The Reappearance of Rachel Price. She stated that doing brain research for the novel was the first time she had to consult an expert.

== Synopsis ==
The novel follows Jet Mason, a twenty-seven-year-old woman from Woodstock, Vermont. On Halloween night, she is attacked from behind and left for dead. She wakes up thirty-six hours later in a hospital with a skull so severely fractured that she is left with the option to either undergo an immediate surgery with a high fatality rate or die of an aneurysm in a week. She declines the surgery, and decides to spend her final week alive finding her attacker.

== Reception ==
The novel won a Goodreads Choice Award in the Readers' Favorite Mystery & Thriller category. It was Good Morning America's book club pick for August. It reached the number one position on the New York Times Hardcover Fiction Best Sellers List.

Shelf Awareness praised it for having the same "propulsive plotting" as Jackson's young adult novels. In a review for the New York Times, Sarah Lyall called it "surprisingly suspenseful and compelling" despite its "bonkers premise". In a review for the Washington Post, E.A. Aymar praised the sarcastic voice of the novel's protagonist as the book's biggest draw. However, he stated that the extent of the protagonist's investment in solving her own murder strains credulity at times, and noted that some readers may find her nihilism and constant quips exasperating.
