= Bea Fitzgerald =

English novelist

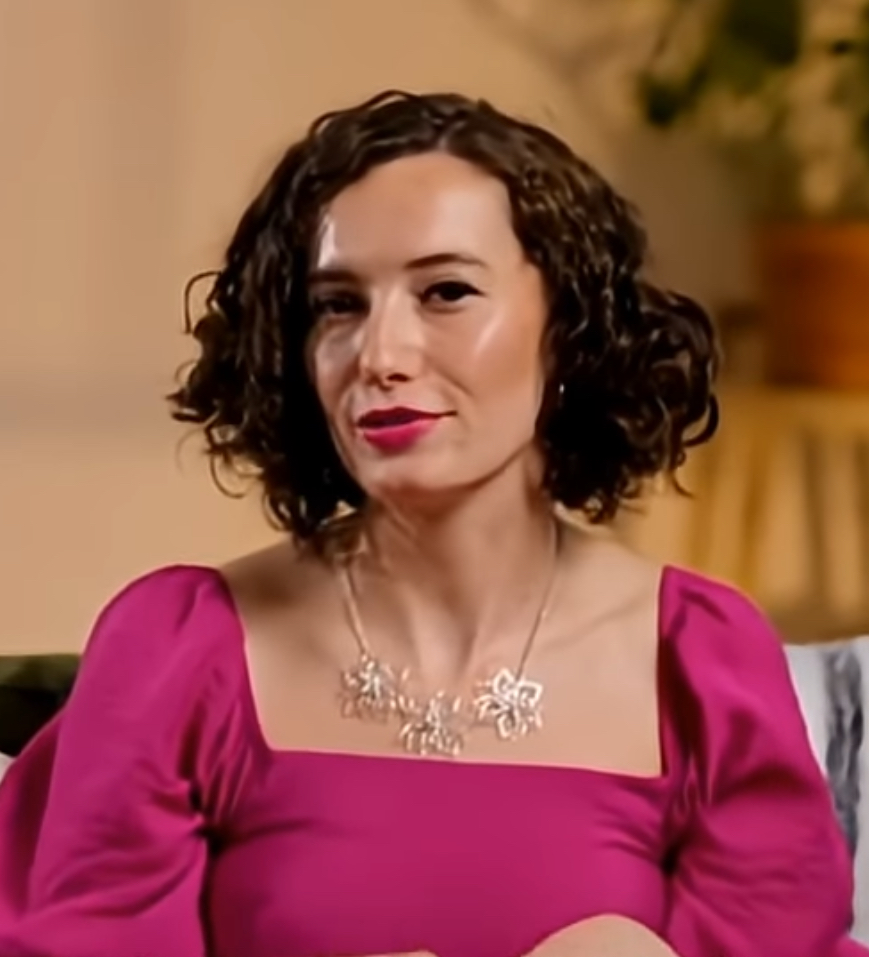
- Fitzgerald in 2026
- Born: 19 August 1996 (age 30)
- Education: University of Reading (BA, 2017)
- Years active: 2018–present
- Website: beafitzgerald.com

Bea Fitzgerald (born 19 August 1996) is an English novelist. Her debut young adult novel Girl, Goddess, Queen (2023) became a Sunday Times bestseller and received a Romantic Novel of the Year Award among other accolades.

== Early life ==
Fitzgerald is from Maldon, Essex. She graduated with a Bachelor of Arts in English literature from the University of Reading in 2017.

== Career ==
After graduating from university, Fitzgerald got a marketing job at Scholastic. Fitzgerald then worked as an assistant editor for Hodder & Stoughton. In 2022, she joined the Blair Partnership as a digital agent.

In 2022, Fitzgerald signed her first three-book deal with Penguin Books and Puffin Books, through which she published her debut novel Girl, Goddess, Queen in 2023. The novel is a young adult retelling of the Greek myth of Hades and Persephone. Girl, Goddess, Queen became a Sunday Times bestseller, won a Romantic Novel of the Year Award in the Fantasy category, and was shortlisted for the Waterstones Children's Book Prize for Older Fiction, the YA Book Prize, and a Books Are My Bag Readers' Award.

The second and third myth retellings sold in the book deal titled The End Crowns All, a sapphic reimagining of the Trojan War, and A Beautiful Evil, based on the myth of Pandora, followed in 2024 and 2025 respectively. Also in 2024 via a two-book deal with Penguin Michael Joseph (PMJ), Fitzgerald published her first adult thriller novel Then Things Went Dark.

She is a writing coach at The Novelry.

== Personal life ==
Fitzgerald is autistic and identifies as both bisexual and asexual.

== Bibliography ==
=== Young adult ===
- Girl, Goddess, Queen (2023)
- The End Crowns All (2024)
- A Beautiful Evil (2025)
- This Divine Revelry (2026)

=== Adult ===
- Then Things Went Dark (2024)
- Better Than Revenge (2026)

== Accolades ==
Year	Award	Category	Title	Result	Ref.
2023	Books Are My Bag Readers' Awards	Young Adult Fiction	Girl, Goddess, Queen	Shortlisted	
2024	Waterstones Children's Book Prize	Older Fiction	Girl, Goddess, Queen	Shortlisted	
2024	Romantic Novel Awards	Fantasy	Girl, Goddess, Queen	Won	
2024	YA Book Prize	—| style="background: #FE9; color:black; vertical-align: middle; text-align: center; " class="table-no2"|Shortlisted	Girl, Goddess, Queen		
2025	YA Book Prize	—| style="background: #FE9; color:black; vertical-align: middle; text-align: center; " class="table-no2"|Shortlisted	The End Crowns All	Shortlisted	
