= Danielle Jawando =

English writer

- Born: Danielle Nadine Jawando; June 1988; Manchester, England
- Education: University of East London (BA, MA); University of Greenwich (PGCE)

Danielle Nadine Jawando (born June 1988) is an English writer best known for her young adult novels. Her second novel When Our Worlds Collided (2022) won the Jhalak Prize and the YA Book Prize.

== Early life and education ==
Jawando was born in Manchester to an Irish-Nigerian father and an Irish-Ghanaian mother. Her father also has Brazilian heritage through his grandfather. Jawando attended Oakwood High School (now Chorlton High School). She graduated with a Bachelor of Arts (BA) in 2009 and a Master of Arts (MA) in 2012, both in Creative Writing from the University of East London (UEL). After completing her MA, Jawando pursued a Post-Graduate Certificate (PGCE) at the University of Greenwich. She later received the 2021 Alumni Change Maker Award from UEL.

== Career ==
Jawando began her career teaching English and Creative Writing at a further education college (FEC) and started her writing career upon publishing the short story "Paradise 703" for DeadInk. In 2015, Jawando worked as a storyline writer for the ITV soap opera Coronation Street. She became an Associate Lecturer in Creative Writing at Manchester Metropolitan University and the University of Roehampton, as well as a Writer-in-Residence at New Writing North.

Her short story "The Deerstalker" was a finalist in the 2017 We Need Diverse Books competition. In 2019, she wrote a non-fiction installment of Laurence King Publishing's Little Guides to Great Lives series on Maya Angelou. Jawando signed a two-book deal with Simon & Schuster, through which she published her debut fiction novel And the Stars Were Burning Brightly in 2020. Set in Wythenshawe, the novel follows 15-year-old Nathan who grapples with his older brother Al's suicide. And the Stars Were Burning Brightly won Best Senior Novel at the Great Reads Award and was shortlisted for the Waterstones Children's Book Prize, the YA Book Prize, the Jhalak Prize, and the Branford Boase Award. It was also longlisted for the Carnegie Medal.

Jawando's second novel When Our Worlds Collided was published in 2022. When Our Worlds Collided won the Jhalak Prize, the YA Book Prize, and the Diverse Book Award. It was also shortlisted for the Books Are My Bag Readers' Choice Award and longlisted for the Carnegie Medal. It was also called a book to change the world by Laura Bates. In 2023, Bernardine Evaristo in British Vogue named Jawando a breakthrough Black British female novelist.

Jawando then signed another two-book deal with Simon & Schuster, through which she published her third novel If My Words Had Wings. The novel follows a teenager named Tyrell who discovers his voice through spoken word poetry in a young offenders' prison. It explores the disparities within the justice system, mental health and Joint Enterprise. Suzi Feay of Financial Times named If My Words Had Wings one of the best summer 2024 YA novels. If My Words Had Wings was longlisted for the Carnegie Medal and shortlisted for the YA Book Prize, UKLA Book Awards, Diverse Book Awards and the Peter's Children's Book of the Year.

== Publications ==
=== Novels ===
- And the Stars Were Burning Brightly (2020)
- When Our Worlds Collided (2022)
- If My Words Had Wings (2024)

=== Non-fiction ===
- Maya Angelou (2019)

=== Short stories ===
- "Paradise 703" in DeadInk (2012)
- "The Deerstalker" (2017)

== Awards ==
Awards for Jawando's writing
| Year | Title | Award | Category | Result | Ref. |
|---|---|---|---|---|---|
| 2021 | And the Stars Were Burning Brightly | YA Book Prize | | Shortlisted | |
| 2021 | And the Stars Were Burning Brightly | Jhalak Prize | Children's and Young Adult | Shortlisted | |
| 2021 | And the Stars Were Burning Brightly | Carnegie Medal | | Longlisted | |
| 2021 | And the Stars Were Burning Brightly | Waterstones Children's Book Prize | Older Fiction | Shortlisted | |
| 2021 | And the Stars Were Burning Brightly | Branford Boase Award | | Shortlisted | |
| 2021 | And the Stars Were Burning Brightly | Lancashire Book of the Year | | Shortlisted | |
| 2022 | When Our Worlds Collided | Books Are My Bag Readers' Awards | Young Adult Fiction | Shortlisted | |
| 2023 | When Our Worlds Collided | Jhalak Prize | Children's and Young Adult | Won | |
| 2023 | When Our Worlds Collided | Carnegie Medal | | Longlisted | |
| 2023 | When Our Worlds Collided | YA Book Prize | | Won | |
| 2023 | When Our Worlds Collided | Diverse Book Awards | YA Fiction | Won | |
| 2025 | If My Words Had Wings | Carnegie Medal | | Longlisted | |
| 2025 | If My Words Had Wings | YA Book Prize | | Shortlisted | |
| 2025 | If My Words Had Wings | UKLA Book Awards | 11–14+ | Shortlisted | |
| 2025 | If My Words Had Wings | Diverse Book Awards | YA | Shortlisted | |
| 2025 | If My Words Had Wings | Peter's Children's Book of the Year | Teen Fiction | Shortlisted | |
