= A Song for Ella Grey =

2014 novel by David Almond

- First edition
- Author: David Almond
- Illustrator: Karen Radford
- Language: English
- Genre: Young adult fiction
- Published: 2014 (Hodder Children's Books)
- Publication place: England
- Media type: Print (hardback)
- Pages: 276
- ISBN: 9781444922134
- OCLC: 893311046

A Song for Ella Grey is a 2014 young adult novel, written by David Almond and illustrated by Karen Radford. It is based on the legend, Orpheus and Eurydice.

== Reception ==
Publishers Weekly, in a starred review of A Song for Ella Grey, wrote "Like Orpheus’s music, Almond’s lyrical narrative will sweep readers on a journey to unearthly, mysterious realms and back. Mythological characters come to life while remaining enigmatic enough to set imaginations spinning." and Kirkus Reviews wrote "Almond brings his hypnotic lyricism to this darkly romantic tale that sings of the madness of youth, the ache of love, and the near-impossibility of grasping death." The Guardian called it "a beautiful book that works on several levels."

A Song for Ella Grey has also been reviewed by Booklist, Voice of Youth Advocates magazine, The Horn Book Magazine, School Library Connection, The School Library Journal, The Bulletin of the Center for Children's Books, and The Daily Telegraph.

== Awards ==
- 2015 The Bookseller YA Book Prize - shortlist
- 2015 Guardian Children's Fiction Prize - winner
- 2015 IBW Children's Book Award - shortlist
- 2015 Peters' Book of the Year Teen Fiction - winner
- 2016 UKLA Book Award - longlist
- 2016 Carnegie Medal - nominated
- 2016 YALSA Best Fiction for Young Adults
