= Patrice Lawrence =

British writer and journalist (born 1960s)

Patrice Lawrence MBE, FRSL
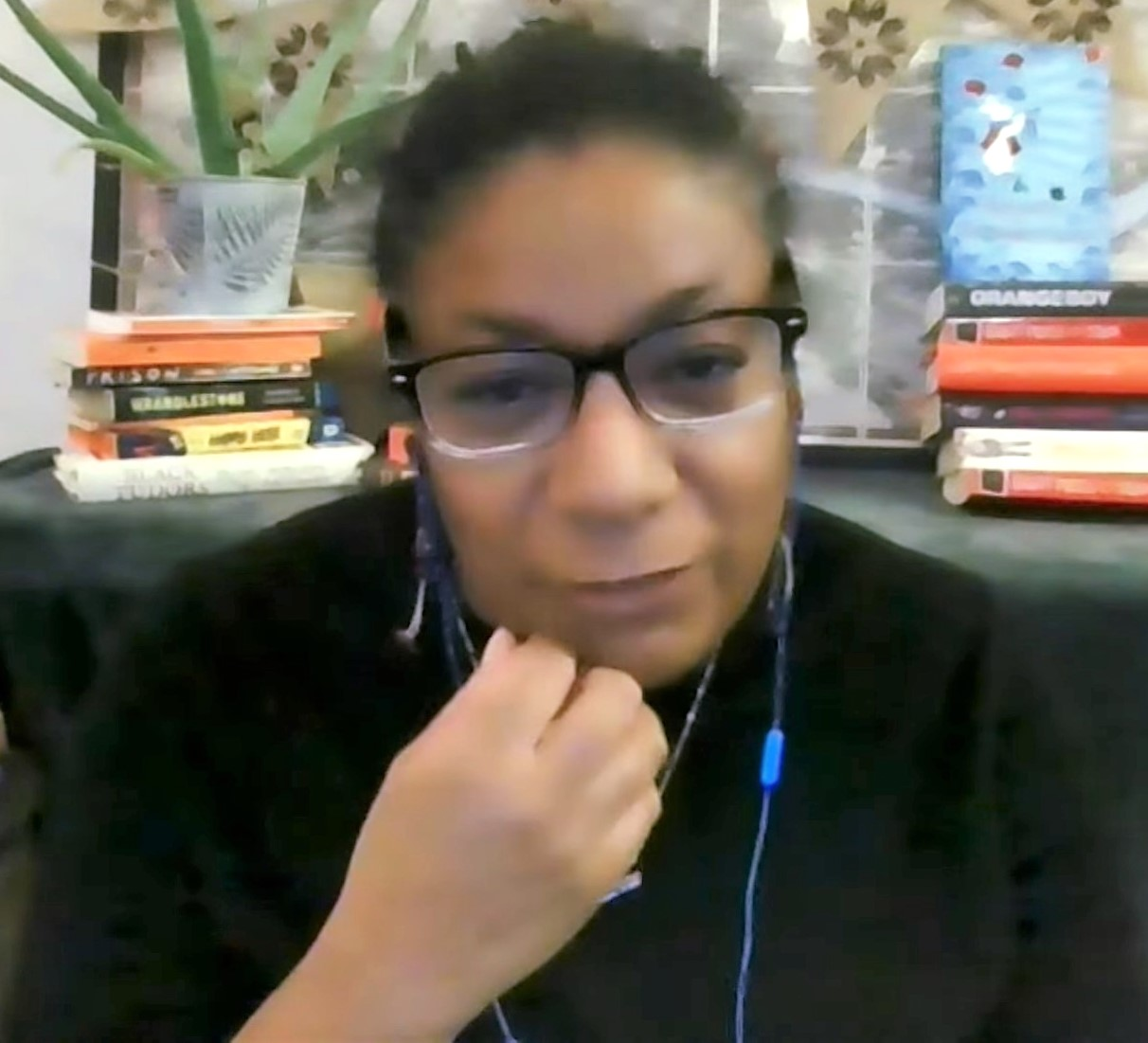
- Lawrence in a 2022 discussion at the British Library
- Born: 1960s Brighton, Sussex, England
- Education: Goldsmiths, University of London; Sheffield University
- Occupations: Fiction writer and journalist
- Notable work: Orangeboy (2016); Eight Pieces of Silva (2020)
- Awards: The Bookseller YA Book Prize; Waterstones Children's Book Prize for Older Children; Jhalak Prize (Children's & YA); Children's Laureate

Patrice Lawrence MBE, FRSL (born 1960s) is a British writer and journalist, who has published fiction both for adults and children. Her writing has won awards including the Waterstones Children's Book Prize for Older Children and The Bookseller YA Book Prize. In 2021, she won the Jhalak Prize's inaugural children's and young adult category for her book Eight Pieces of Silva (2020).

She became the UK's Children's Laureate in 2026.

== Biography ==
=== Early years and education ===
Patrice Lawrence was born in Brighton, Sussex, England, and was brought up in an Italian-Trinidadian family, her mother having come to England from Trinidad to train as a psychiatric nurse. Her biological father was from Barbados but broke off his relationship with her mother before Lawrence was born, leading her into foster care with a white working-class family until the age of four, while her mother completed her training.

Lawrence studied English and History of Art at Goldsmiths, University of London, went on to earn an MA degree in Writing for Film and TV from Sheffield University, and was mentored by the BBC as a prospective comedy writer.

=== Literary career ===
Lawrence's first story to be published was "Duck, Duck, Goose", which was included in The Decibel Penguin Prize Anthology (Penguin Books, 2006). It was while attending an Arvon Foundation crime writing course led by Dreda Say Mitchell and Frances Fyfield that Lawrence had the idea for her debut young adults' novel, Orangeboy.

Published in 2016, Orangeboy won The Bookseller's 2017 YA Book Prize, the Waterstones Children's Book Prize for Older Children 2017, and was shortlisted for the 2016 Costa Children's Book Award. It received a five-star rating from MuggleNet, with the reviewer stating: "I absolutely adored this moving story. It is full of tears and laughter, unfettered fears and furious joy, family and friendship. This important, gripping, heart-in-your-throat contemporary about a teen boy swept up in trouble is not to be missed. For fans of Malorie Blackman, Jacqueline Wilson, Alan Gibbons, Benjamin Zephaniah, and Melvin Burgess. If you like your stories real, heartfelt, and moving, Orangeboy is one for you." Lawrence herself has been reported as saying of the novel that "though her primary aim had been to promote hope in her story of a teenager caught in gang violence, she wanted to reflect the real situation faced by many black teenagers in Britain".

Her follow-up book, Indigo Donut (2017), was described by Alex O'Connell in The Times as "addictive", having "many of the themes of a Jacqueline Wilson novel: bullying, fostering, teenage relationships. Yet Lawrence's tale is told with unfettered dialogue and broad-ranging cultural references for an older audience who don't need to be spared the details." The Guardian reviewer wrote: "Her award-winning debut Orangeboy, a gripping urban thriller, announced Patrice Lawrence as a bold, fresh voice in young adult fiction. This promise is realised in her second book, a tender and complex story of first love, family and belonging." Both novels are set in Hackney, London, where Lawrence lived in Lower Clapton from 1997. As of 2026, she lives in Hastings, Sussex.

Lawrence also writes a regular blog centred on her experiences of writing and having her work published, called The Lawrence Line, about which she has said: "There are a lot of people coming up behind you and you want to let them know how it happens, particularly for young black writers. I want to show that I've had a good experience of publishing and give people hope that they can tell their stories."

Lawrence is a contributor to the 2019 anthology New Daughters of Africa, edited by Margaret Busby.

=== Awards, recognition and literary advocacy ===
In the 2021 Birthday Honours, Lawrence was appointed a Member of the Order of the British Empire (MBE) for services to Literature. In October 2021, she was announced as taking on the role of ambassador for First Story, a charity promoting creative writing for young people, with a focus on those in low-income communities.

In 2023, she was elected a Fellow of the Royal Society of Literature.

From September 2024 to March 2025, she was Writer in Residence of the children's reading charity BookTrust, with a remit "to champion reading for pleasure for children facing challenging circumstances".

In 2026, Lawrence was chosen as the Waterstones Children's Laureate, a two-year appointment previously held by writers including Frank Cottrell-Boyce, Quentin Blake, Michael Morpurgo, Jacqueline Wilson, Michael Rosen, Julia Donaldson, Malorie Blackman, Lauren Child and Cressida Cowell.

== Selected bibliography ==
- Granny Ting Ting – for children (A & C Black, 2009, ISBN 978-1408111567, 80 pp.)
- Orangeboy (Hodder Children's Books, 2016, ISBN 978-1444927207. Also available as an audiobook, narrated by Ben Bailey Smith.
- Indigo Donut (Hodder Children's Books, 2017, ISBN 978-1444927184)
- Eight Pieces of Silva (Hodder Children's Books, 2020, ISBN 978-1444954746)
- Rat (Oxford University Press, 2021, ISBN 978-0-19-849493-5)
