= YA Book Prize =

- Awarded for: young adult novels
- Country: United Kingdom
- Presented by: The Bookseller
- First award: 2014; 12 years ago
- Website: www.thebookseller.com/awards/the-ya-book-prize

The YA Book Prize is a British literary award established by publishing magazine The Bookseller in 2014. The accolade is given to young adult novels published by an author in the United Kingdom or Ireland in the previous year.

As of 2022, the prize is presented at the Edinburgh International Book Festival. Judges have included past winners Patrice Lawrence and Alice Oseman.

== Recipients ==
=== 2010s ===
Year	Author	Work	Ref
2015
2015	Louise O'Neill	Only Ever Yours	
2015	David Almond	A Song for Ella Grey	
2015	Keren David	Salvage	
2015	Juno Dawson	Say Her Name	
2015	Tom Ellison, Lucy Ivison	Lobster	
2015	Sally Green	Half Bad	
2015	Kim Hood	Finding a Voice	
2015	Dawn O'Porter	Goose	
2015	Non Pratt	Trouble	
2015	Marcus Sedgwick	The Ghosts of Heaven	
2016
2016	Sarah Crossan	One	
2016	Holly Bourne	Am I Normal Yet?	
2016	Jenny Downham	Unbecoming	
2016	Frances Hardinge	The Lie Tree	
2016	Catherine Johnson	The Curious Tale of the Lady Caraboo	
2016	Patrick Ness	The Rest of Us Just Live Here	
2016	Louise O'Neill	Asking for It	
2016	Melinda Salisbury	The Sin Eater's Daughter	
2016	William Sutcliffe	Concentr8	
2016	Lisa Williamson	The Art of Being Normal	
2017
2017	Patrice Lawrence	Orangeboy	
2017	Sara Barnard	Beautiful Broken Things	
2017	Malorie Blackman	Chasing the Stars	
2017	Laure Eve	The Graces	
2017	Clare Furniss	How Not to Disappear	
2017	Lisa Heathfield	Paper Butterflies	
2017	Peadar Ó Guilín	The Call	
2017	Francesca Simon	The Monstrous Child	
2017	Martin Stewart	Riverkeep	
2017	Alex Wheatle	Crongton Knights	
2018
2018	Will Hill	After the Fire	
2018	Emily Barr	The One Memory of Flora Banks	
2018	M. A. Bennett	S.T.A.G.S	
2018	Holly Bourne	It Only Happens in the Movies	
2018	Sarah Crossan	Moonrise	
2018	Patrice Lawrence	Indigo Donut	
2018	Patrick Ness	Release	
2018	Sally Nicholls	Things a Bright Girl Can Do	
2018	Philip Pullman	La Belle Sauvage	
2018	Alex Wheatle	Straight Outta Crongton	
2019
2019	Sara Barnard	Goodbye, Perfect	
2019	Juno Dawson	Clean	
2019	Laura Dockrill	Big Bones	
2019	Muhammad Khan	I Am Thunder	
2019	Louise O'Neill	The Surface Breaks	
2019	Alice Oseman	I Was Born for This	
2019	Tom Pollock	White Rabbit, Red Wolf	
2019	Fiona Shaw	Outwalkers	
2019	Katherine Webber	Only Love Can Break Your Heart	
2019	Laura Wood	A Sky Painted Gold	

=== 2020s ===
Year	Author	Work	Ref
2020
2020	Juno Dawson	Meat Market	
2020	Dean Atta	The Black Flamingo	
2020	Malorie Blackman	Crossfire	
2020	Holly Bourne	The Places I've Cried in Public	
2020	Jenny Downham	Furious Thing	
2020	Frances Hardinge	Deeplight	
2020	Holly Jackson	A Good Girl's Guide to Murder	
2020	Lauren James	The Quiet at the End of the World	
2020	Kiran Millwood Hargrave	The Deathless Girls	
2020	William Sutcliffe	The Gifted, the Talented and Me	
2021
2021	Alice Oseman	Loveless	
2021	Darren Charlton	Wranglestone	
2021	Holly Jackson	Good Girl, Bad Blood	
2021	Danielle Jawando	And the Stars Were Burning Brightly	
2021	Patrice Lawrence	Eight Pieces of Silva	
2021	Meg Rosoff	The Great Godden	
2021	Bethany Rutter	Melt My Heart	
2021	Melinda Salisbury	Hold Back the Tide	
2021	Alex Wheatle	Cane Warriors	
2021	Laura Wood	A Snowfall of Silver	
2022
2022	Adiba Jaigirdar	Hani and Ishu's Guide to Fake Dating	
2022	Faridah Àbíké-Íyímídé	Ace of Spades	
2022	Holly Bourne	The Yearbook	
2022	Tanya Byrne	Afterlove	
2022	Femi Fadugba	The Upper World	
2022	Simon James Green	You're the One That I Want	
2022	Manjeet Mann	The Crossing	
2022	Krystal Sutherland	House of Hollow	
2022	Lisa Williamson	First Day of My Life	
2023
2023	Danielle Jawando	When Our Worlds Collided	
2023	Catherine Doyle, Katherine Webber	Twin Crowns	
2023	Louise Finch	The Eternal Return of Clara Hart	
2023	Holly Jackson	Five Survive	
2023	Becky Jerams, Ellie Wyatt	The Songs You've Never Heard	
2023	Nadia Mikail	The Cats We Meet Along the Way	
2023	Melinda Salisbury	Her Dark Wings	
2023	Cynthia So	If You Still Recognise Me	
2023	Laura Steven	The Society for Soulless Girls	
2023	Alex Wheatle	Kemosha of the Caribbean	
2024
2024	Lex Croucher	Gwen & Art Are Not in Love	
2024	Benjamin Dean	How to Die Famous	
2024	Bea Fitzgerald	Girl, Goddess, Queen	
2024	Ravena Guron	This Book Kills	
2024	Anika Hussain	This Is How You Fall in Love	
2024	Jenny Ireland	The First Move	
2024	Josh Silver	HappyHead	
2024	Laura Steven	Every Exquisite Thing	
2024	Kate Weston	Murder on a School Night	
2025
2025	Moira Buffini	Songlight	
2025	Faridah Àbíké-Íyímídé and Adiba Jaigirdar	Four Eids and a Funeral	
2025	Sarah Crossan	Where the Heart Should Be	
2025	Catherine Doyle	The Dagger and the Flame	
2025	Leon Egan	Lover Birds	
2025	Bea Fitzgerald	The End Crowns All	
2025	Holly Jackson	The Reappearance of Rachel Price	
2025	Danielle Jawando	If My Words Had Wings	
2025	Margaret McDonald	Glasgow Boys	
2025	O R Sorrel	Apocalypse Cow	
2026
2026	Josh Silver	Traumaland	
2026	Bea Fitzgerald	A Beautiful Evil	
2026	Ravena Guron	Mondays Are Murder	
2026	Lauryn Hamilton Murray	Heir of Storms	
2026	Anika Hussain	Heartbreaker	
2026	William Hussey	The Boy I Love	
2026	Caroline O'Donoghue	Shipshock	
2026	Elgan Rhys (tr Mared Roberts)	The Five	
2026	Laura Steven	Our Infinite Fates	
2026	Harry Trevaldwyn	The Romantic Tragedies of a Drama King	

== Special achievement award ==
- A Change is Gonna Come anthology (2018)
- Malorie Blackman (2021)

== Repeat nominees ==
=== Multiple nods ===
==== 4 nominations ====
- Holly Bourne
- Holly Jackson
- Alex Wheatle

==== 3 nominations ====
- Sarah Crossan
- Juno Dawson
- Bea Fitzgerald
- Danielle Jawando
- Patrice Lawrence
- Louise O'Neill
- Melinda Salisbury
- Laura Steven

==== 2 nominations ====
- Faridah Àbíké-Íyímídé
- Sara Barnard
- Malorie Blackman
- Jenny Downham
- Catherine Doyle
- Ravena Guron
- Frances Hardinge
- Anika Hussain
- Adiba Jaigirdar
- Patrick Ness
- Alice Oseman
- Josh Silver
- William Sutcliffe
- Katherine Webber
- Lisa Williamson
- Laura Wood

== External ==
- Official website
