= Laurie Gilmore =

American author

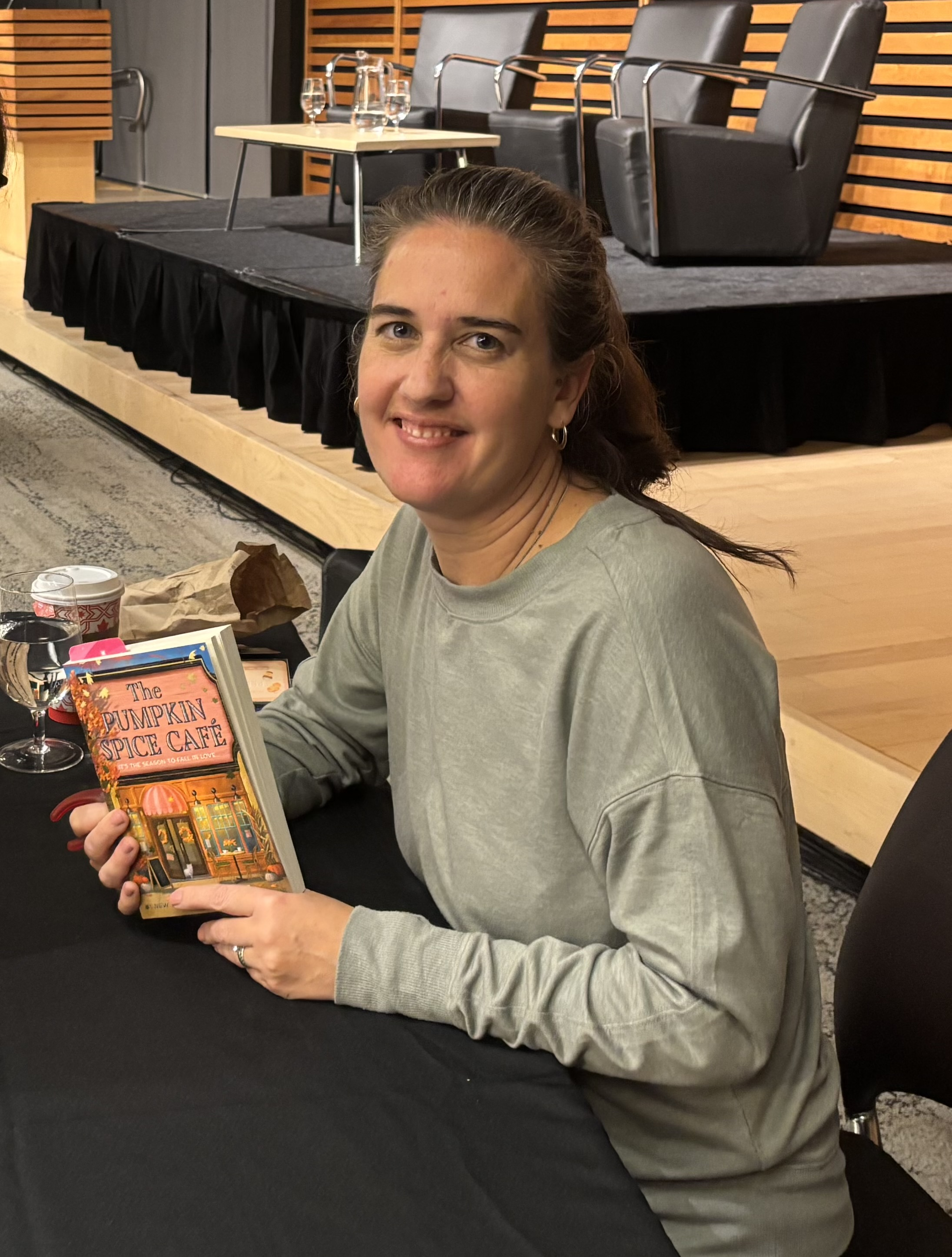
- Gilmore at a fan signing in Toronto in 2025
- Writing career
- Pen name: Laurie Gilmore; Melissa McTernan
- Years active: 2021-present
- Notable works: The Pumpkin Spice Cafe (2023); The Christmas Tree Farm (2024)
- Notable awards: TikTok Book Awards; 2024
- Website: www.thelauriegilmore.com/about/

Laurie Gilmore is the pen name of American author Melissa McTernan. She is best known for her ongoing contemporary romance series Dream Harbor. The first book in the series, The Pumpkin Spice Café (2023), won the TikTok Book Awards TikTok Shop Book of the Year in 2024.

== Career ==
=== Dream Harbor Series ===
In 2023, Gilmore released the first novel in her ongoing Dream Harbor series, The Pumpkin Spice Café. Gilmore was asked to write the book by HarperCollins after signing a contract for her Wolf Brothers series under her real name. In an article by The Times, the process of the book's creation was described by an unnamed literary agent as having involved "algorithms devised by their [HarperCollins] marketing people" before "they got a writer on board". The book, described by Good Morning America as "a romantic mystery read" follows Jeanie, a woman who moves to a small town and falls in love with a local farmer, Logan. The book became popular on TikTok and went on to win the TikTok Shop book of the year at the 2024 TikTok Book Awards.

The follow-up book, The Cinnamon Bun Book Store, was released in September 2024. In October 2024, Gilmore released The Christmas Tree Farm. This second release of the year led to an increase in sales of The Cinnamon Bun Book Store, with both selling a combined 24,000 print copies two weeks after The Christmas Tree Farm's release. The Christmas Tree Farm sold 14,720 copies in the UK its first week and was a Sunday Times Bestseller. The Cinnamon Bun Book Store was nominated for the Goodreads Choice Award for Readers' Favourite Romance in 2024.

In 2025, the fourth and fifth books in the series were released. In its first three weeks of sales, the series' fourth instalment, The Strawberry Patch Pancake House, sold 25,863 copies in the UK, the third-highest non-World Book Day single-week sales figure of 2025 at the time of its release. Gilmore's fifth Dream Harbor book, The Gingerbread Bakery, debuted on September 11, 2025, outselling previous titles with 31,515 books sold in the first days of its release, becoming the year's second-biggest paperback launch in the UK. In the U.S., The Gingerbread Bakery debuted at No. 1 on both the New York Times best-seller list for paperback trade fiction and the Sunday Times Bestsellers List. A month later, the novella The Apple Pie Ice Cream Parlor was distributed exclusively in the Netherlands and Belgium by Van Ditmar to celebrate English Book Week 2025. Gilmore noted on social media that she would provide updates about releases in other countries.

A sixth book, The Daisy Chain Flower Shop, was released on May 19, 2026.

Reviews of the series have been mixed. A review by Publishers Weekly praised The Cinnamon Bun Bookstore, calling it a "charming break from reality", whilst a review by Johanna Thomas-Corr in The Times described the books as "SEO-friendly Frankenliterature". The Dream Harbor series has been translated into 31 languages. Videos about the books have been viewed over 26 million times on TikTok and books from the series have featured on The New York Times, The Sunday Times, Indie, USA Today and Publishers Weekly bestseller lists.

=== Publishing as Melissa McTernan ===
Under the name Melissa McTernan, Gilmore has written romantic fantasy. Beginning writing in 2019 whilst her children were at school, her debut novel under this name was published in 2021. In 2022, she won the Stiletto Award for "Contemporary Romance - Short", for her novella Secret Family Recipes for Love and Butter Cookies, published under this name.

Her first series under this pen name, The Wolf Brothers series, began with the release of A Curse of Blood and Wolves by One More Chapter, an imprint of HarperCollins, in 2024. The book, described by Good Housekeeping as "Little Red Riding Hood - but make it hot!" was released in September 2024. A sequel, titled A Curse of Fate and Wolves, was expected to be released in April 2026. In February 2026, Gilmore announced that A Curse of Blood and Wolves would no longer be available to purchase with the Wolf Brothers series being republished as the Maple Hollow series under her Laurie Gilmore penname. The first book of the planned trilogy, renamed Big Bad Wolf, was re-published in September 2026 with a sequel, Wild Wicked Mate, following in October.

== Personal life ==
Gilmore was born in the United States and lives now in Upstate New York with her husband and children. Before her writing career, she was a stay-at-home mother.

== Bibliography ==
=== Dream Harbor series ===
- —— (2023). The Pumpkin Spice Cafe. HarperCollins. ISBN 9780008610678.
- —— (2024). The Cinnamon Bun Book Store. HarperCollins. ISBN 9780008641580.
- —— (2024). The Christmas Tree Farm. HarperCollins. ISBN 9780008610746.
- —— (2025). The Strawberry Patch Pancake House. HarperCollins. ISBN 9780008713348.
- —— (2025). The Gingerbread Bakery. ISBN 9780008728090.
- —— (2025). The Apple Pie Ice Cream Parlour. Van Ditmar. ISBN 9780008794521.
- —— (2026). The Daisy Chain Flower Shop. ISBN 9780008761479.

==== Companion Books ====
- —— (2025). The Pumpkin Spice Cafe Coloring Book. HarperCollins. ISBN 9780008759858.

=== Maple Hollow series ===
- —— (2026). Big Bad Wolf. HarperCollins. ISBN 9780008831783.
- —— (2026). Wild Wicked Mate. HarperCollins. ISBN 9780008834890.

=== Wolf Brothers series (as Melissa McTernan) ===
- —— (2024). A Curse of Blood and Wolves. One More Chapter. ISBN 9780008643027.

=== Standalone works (as Melissa McTernan) ===
- —— (2021). Through the Fairy Ring. Decadent Publishing LLC. ISBN 9781683616085.
- —— (2021). Missing Maren. Decadent Publishing LLC. ISBN 9781683614944.
- —— (2021). Secret Family Recipes for Love and Butter Cookies. The Wild Rose Press. ISBN 9781509240708.
- —— (2022). His Fairies. ASIN B0B15LN424.
- —— (2022). Bewitched By My Best Friend. ASIN B09QPXH2NZ.
- —— (2022). Married to the Fae Queen. ASIN B09YDH4PYM.
- —— (2023). Marked for Each Other: The Princess and The Barbarian. The Wild Rose Press. ISBN 9781509247196.

=== Short fiction (as Melissa McTernan) ===
- "Once Upon an Assassin's Kiss" (2022; collected in Sacred: A Charity Romance Anthology for Bodily Autonomy (2022)) ASIN B0B81B5K7K
