= Catherine Doyle =

Irish author (born 1990)

- Born: 10 March 1990 (age 36)
- Education: University of Galway
- Years active: 2014–present
- Website: www.catherinedoylebooks.com

Catherine Doyle (born 1990) is an Irish author of children's and young adult (YA) fiction. She has authored Sunday Times and New York Times-bestselling novels and received a number of accolades.

== Early life ==
Doyle grew up in Galway. Doyle attended Dominican College in Taylors Hill. She graduated with a Bachelor of Arts (BA) in Psychology from NUI Galway. She later completed a Master of Arts (MA) in Literature and Publishing.

== Career ==
Doyle began her career with the Blood for Blood mafia romance trilogy, publishing her debut novel Vendetta in 2014. The second and third installments in the trilogy were Inferno and Mafiosa. The Blood for Blood trilogy was later re-published by Simon & Schuster.

Via a five-way auction in 2017, Bloomsbury Children's Books acquired the rights to publish Doyle's middle-grade novel The Storm Keeper's Island in 2018. The Storm Keeper's Island won a Books Are My Bag Readers' Award in the Middle Grade category and an Independent Bookshop Week (IBW) Book Award in the Children's category. In 2019, Bloomsbury acquired two further novels in the series: The Lost Tide Warriors (2019) and The Storm Keepers' Battle (2021). The first two books were both shortlisted for an Irish Book Award in the Children's category.

At the start of 2020, Puffin Books acquired the rights to publish a standalone novel from Doyle titled The Miracle on Ebenezer Street for Christmas later that year. The Miracle on Ebenezer Street was shortlisted for an Irish Book Award.

Announced at the end of 2020, Electric Monkey (a Farshore Books and HarperCollins UK imprint) acquired the rights to publish Twin Crowns, a collaboration between Doyle and Katherine Webber and the start of a fantasy series in 2022. Twin Crowns debuted on The Sunday Times bestseller list in the Children's category and was shortlisted for the YA Book Prize. The sequel Cursed Crowns also became a Sunday Times bestseller. Doyle also wrote the standalone book The Lost Girl King. Both Twin Crowns and The Lost Girl King received Irish Book Award nominations.

Via a two-book deal in 2023, Simon & Schuster Children's Books acquired the rights to publish Doyle's YA romantasy novel The Dagger and the Flame in 2024, the first in her City of Fantome trilogy. The Dagger and the Flame was an instant Number 1 Sunday Times Bestseller and a New York Times bestseller and was shortlisted for the 2025 YA Book Prize. Also published in 2024 was Doyle's standalone Middle Grade adventure Pirates of the Darksea via Bloomsbury.

== Bibliography ==
=== Blood for Blood trilogy ===
- Vendetta (2014)
- Inferno (2016)
- Mafiosa (2017)

=== Storm Keeper Quartet ===
- The Storm Keeper's Island (2018)
- The Lost Tide Warriors (2019)
- The Storm Keepers' Battle (2021)

=== Twin Crowns (with Katherine Webber) ===
- Twin Crowns (2022)
- Cursed Crowns (2023)
- Burning Crowns (2024)
- King of Beasts (2026)

=== City of Fantome trilogy ===
- The Dagger and the Flame (2024)
- The Rebel and the Rose (2025)
- The Dragon and the Dove (2026)

=== Scare BnB trilogy ===
- Scare BnB (2026)
- Scare BnB: Ghouls just wanna have fun (2026)

=== Standalone novels ===
- The Miracle on Ebenezer Street (2020)
- The Lost Girl King (2022)
- Pirates of Darksea (2024)

=== Picture books ===
- Believe with Freya Hartas (2026)

== Accolades ==
Year	Award	Category	Title	Result	Ref.
2018	Books Are My Bag Readers' Awards	Middle Grade	The Storm Keeper's Island	Won	
2018	Irish Book Awards	Children's Book of the Year	The Storm Keeper's Island	Shortlisted	
2019	Independent Bookshop Week (IBW) Book Awards	Children's	The Storm Keeper's Island	Won	
2019	Irish Book Awards	Children's Book of the Year	The Lost Tide Warriors	Shortlisted	
2020	Irish Book Awards	Children's Book of the Year	The Miracle on Ebenezer Street	Shortlisted	
2022	Irish Book Awards	Children's Book of the Year	The Lost Girl King	Shortlisted	
2022	Irish Book Awards	Teen / Young Adult Book of the Year	Twin Crowns	Shortlisted	
2023	YA Book Prize		Twin Crowns	Shortlisted	
2024	Irish Book Awards	Teen / Young Adult Book of the Year	The Dagger and the Flame	Shortlisted	
2025	YA Book Prize		The Dagger and the Flame	Shortlisted	
