= The Sin Eater's Daughter =

Young adult fantasy trilogy by Melinda Salisbury

- The Heart Collector The Sin Eater's Daughter The Sleeping Prince The Scarecrow Queen
- Author: Melinda Salisbury
- Cover artist: Jamie Gregory
- Country: United Kingdom
- Language: English
- Genre: Young Adult Fiction; Fantasy
- Publisher: Scholastic Press
- Published: 2015 - 2017
- Media type: Print, e-book, audiobook
- No. of books: 3 novels, 3 short stories

The Sin Eater's Daughter is a young adult fantasy trilogy written by British YA author Melinda Salisbury and published by Scholastic Press. The first book in the trilogy, The Sin Eater's Daughter, was published in 2015 on 24 February and marked Salisbury's first book in print. The second book in the trilogy, The Sleeping Prince, was published the following year. A short story prequel, The King of Rats, was also released that year but only as an exclusive print edition at Young Adult Literature Convention in London. The third and final book in the trilogy, The Scarecrow Queen, was released in 2017. Later in 2017, a short story collection set in the same world, The Heart Collector, was released. This included The King of Rats and two brand new short stories entitled The Heart Collector and Mully No-Hands.

The trilogy follows the character of Twylla, a young girl that is engaged to marry her kingdom's prince, but is shunned due to her ability to kill with only a touch of her hand. She is used as a weapon by the Queen to kill anyone who is accused of treason. The trilogy focuses on Twylla's journey in protecting her kingdom and learning more about herself as she goes along.

Year	#	Title	Contains	Pages
2017	0.5	The Heart Collector	The King of Rats	86
2017	0.6	The Heart Collector	The Heart Collector	86
2017	0.7	The Heart Collector	Mully No-Hands	86
2015	1	The Sin Eater's Daughter		352
2016	2	The Sleeping Prince		384
2017	3	The Scarecrow Queen		336

== Publication history ==
The first book in the trilogy, The Sin Eater's Daughter, was published in paperback in the UK on 24 February 2015 and simultaneously published in hardback in the US with a slightly altered cover. A year later, on 4 February 2016, the sequel, The Sleeping Prince, was published in the UK with the US hardback edition releasing a couple of months later on 31 May. On 29 July, an exclusive short story, The King of Rats, became available for any attendees at Young Adult Literature Convention. This was a short booklet available for free. The third and final book in the trilogy, The Scarecrow Queen, was published in 2017 on 2 March. The US trade paperback edition of The Scarecrow Queen released on 31 October 2017. Finally, on 4 May, The Heart Collector, a collection of short stories was released in e-book format worldwide.

== Synopsis ==
=== The Sin Eater's Daughter ===
Twylla is a 16-year-old girl living in the castle, who is engaged to the prince. However, no one talks to her or even looks at her. This is because Twylla is not simply a member of the court. She's an executioner who kills anyone who the Queen has deemed to be guilty of treason. As Twylla is the goddess-embodied, she can kill with a single touch. The queen forces her to touch anyone who the Queen wants dead. Everyone is scared of her and avoids her, even the prince, whose royal blood makes him immune to her touch.

But then one day, Twylla gets a new guard, a boy who is playful, yet he can kill easily with his swordsmanship. He is the only one who doesn't see Twylla as a murder weapon or a goddess, but he instead sees the girl underneath. They get involved in a treasonous romance but that is not all that is bothering Twylla. The queen has come up with a cunning plan to destroy all of her enemies. Can Twylla protect the kingdom? Can she put aside her own love to do her duty? most of the readers might have a doubt if Twylla end up alone or with Lief. most of the readers believe that she ends up alone and happy.

=== The Sleeping Prince ===
The sequel to The Sin Eater's Daughter follows Errin, who is struggling after her brother Lief's disappearance. She is forced to care for her ailing mother as well as find some way to bring in money to the family. She begins to sell illegal herbal cures but that is the least of her problems. The evil Sleeping Prince has been awoken from his enchanted sleep by the Queen and he is threatening Errin's village.

After her village is forced to evacuate due to the impending war against the Sleeping Prince, Errin is left homeless with no one to turn to except for the mysterious Silas, a young man who won't reveal why he keeps buying deadly poisons from Errin. He vows to help but he disappears, leaving Errin to journey across the kingdom to find any way to save herself and her mother. What she ends up finding goes against everything she ever believed about the world and with the threat of the Sleeping Prince looming, Errin must make a choice that could affect the whole kingdom.

=== The Scarecrow Queen ===
This is the conclusion to The Sin Eater's Daughter trilogy. The Sleeping Prince has gained a hold on Lormere and Tregellan, meaning that the rebels are struggling even more to desperately defeat him. Twylla and Errin have been separated and they're both running out of time. If they don't manage to defeat him, The Sleeping Prince may hold the throne forever.

=== The King of Rats ===
Five hundred years before the events of The Sin Eater's Daughter, Tallith was a utopian world. Everyone was privileged, especially the Crown Prince Aurek and his twin sister Aurelia. The twins were well-loved across the world, known for their golden eyes and silver hair. Everyone believed the future of Tallith would be bright in their hands.

But then the rats came.

Desperate to rid their people of the plague, the twins summoned a rat catcher from across the seas. But he doesn't come alone. He brings with him a beautiful daughter who answers to no one. Prince Aurek decides that he has to have her, no matter what, leading him to set in motion a chain of events that changes Tallith as he knows it.

=== The Heart Collector ===
This is a short story collection combining three short stories set in the world of The Sin Eater's Daughter. It includes The King of Rats, The Heart Collector and Mully No-Hands.

The Heart Collector follows a boy who wakes up in the ruins of a castle. He is the Heart Collector, the Bringer, who is cursed to return every one hundred years to find the heart that will wake up his father and this time, the girl he finds seems like she might be the one.

Mully No-Hands follows a baby boy who was born to a beautiful woman and a wealthy man and who was destined to always live a fairy-tale life. He is adored, envied and wants nothing. But not every fairy tale ends with happily ever after.

== Principal characters ==
- Twylla - the main protagonist of the first book.
- Merek - the prince who is engaged to Twylla.
- Lief - the new guard who Twylla falls for in The Sin Eater's Daughter.
- The Queen - the villain in the first novel.
- The Sleeping Prince - the main villain of the trilogy.
- Errin - the main protagonist in the sequel, The Sleeping Prince, who is Lief's sister.
- Silas - the mysterious man who vows to protect Errin in The Sleeping Prince.

== Television adaptation ==
In April 2016 the independent television company Little Island optioned the Sin Eater's Daughter trilogy with the intent to adapt it for television.

== Reception ==
The New York Times praised the first book in the series for its "well-imagined fantasy world". Common Sense Media rated The Sin Eater's Daughter at three out of five stars, commenting that the book's writing was strong. Publishers Weekly also praised the writing and Salisbury's talent for worldbuilding as the world is full of 'shiver-inducing legends, original customs and political and religious debates. Book Trust called The Sin Eater's Daughter a 'delicious read' with an ending that will leave readers begging for the sequel. Kirkus referred to The Sin Eater's Daughter as a 'slow but satisfying read' with great emotion and depth.

The Sin Eater's Daughter has received a number of nominations for awards and prizes such as the Carnegie Medal 2015, the North East Book Awards 2015, The Bookseller YA Book Prize 2015, the Branford Boase 2015 and the Waterstones Children's Book Award 2015. It was also included in the YA categories in both The Bouchercon Antony Awards 2015 and the American Mystery Writer's Association Edgar Awards 2015.

MuggleNet reviewed the trilogy's second book, The Sleeping Prince, favorably and wrote that they enjoyed the book's heroine Errin.
