= Holly Bourne =

British author of young adult fiction

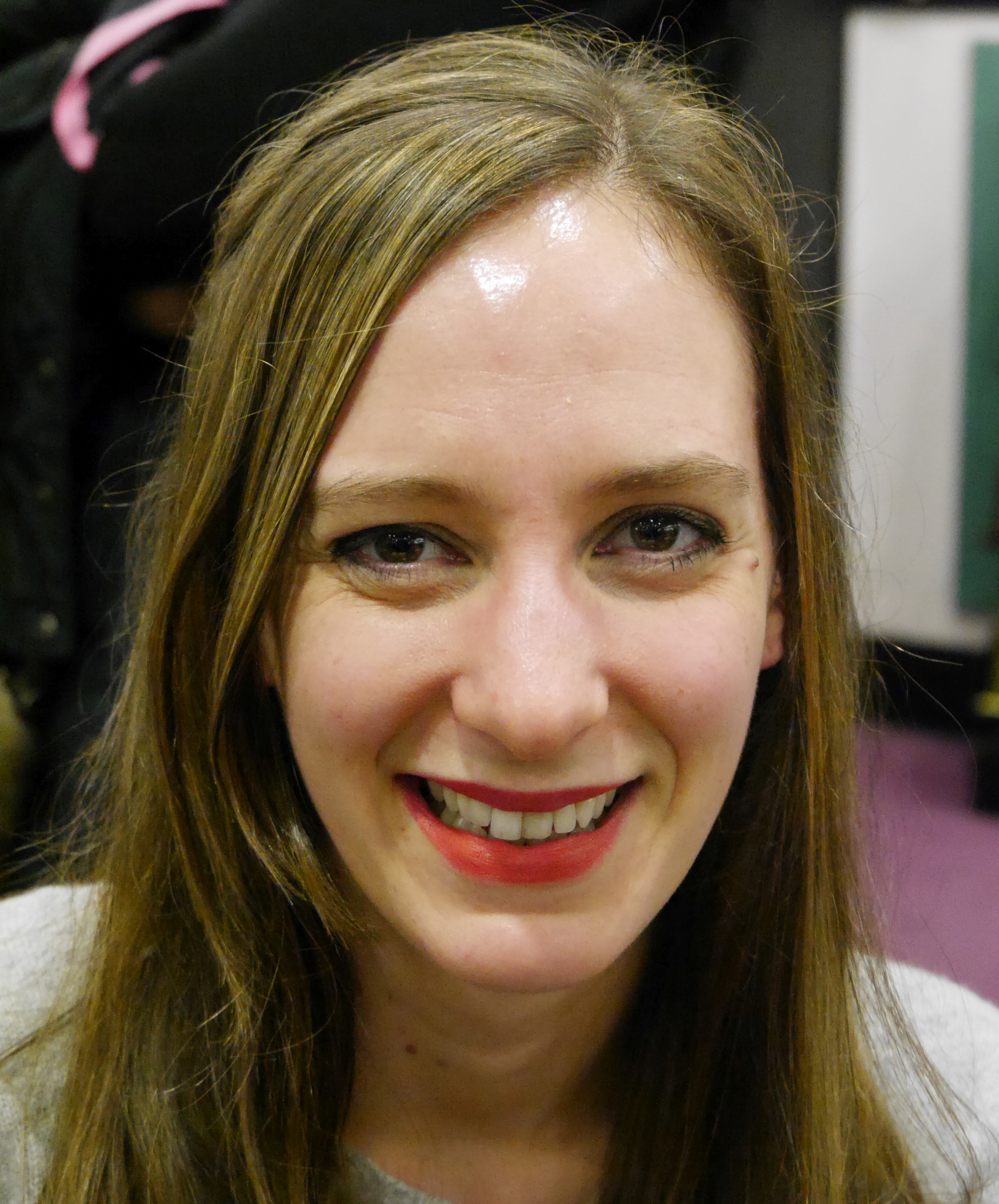
- Holly Bourne, Waterstones, Piccadilly, London, December 2018
- Born: 6 May 1986 (age 39)
- Occupation: Novelist
- Genre: Young adult fiction
- Years active: 2013–present

Website
- Tumblr; Official Website

Holly Bourne (born 6 May 1986) is a British author of young adult fiction who is the author of novel Am I Normal Yet? and several other books. She also writes online on feminist issues and writes for The Mix, a charity-run advice website for under-25s.

== Career ==
Bourne is represented by The Madeleine Milburn Literary, TV & Film Agency. Her debut novel Soulmates was published in September 2013 by Usborne.

Bourne's young adult (YA) novels deal with teenage romance, mental health, and self-doubt. Her YA novel Am I Normal Yet? was praised for its realistic and sensitive portrayal of obsessive-compulsive disorder. It was one of the 2016 World Book Night titles, a UK-wide book giveaway to promote reading for pleasure. Bourne won the Lancashire Book of the Year Award in 2016 for the novel, an award in which young people select both the shortlist and the overall winner.

In 2017, Bourne was a judge for the BBC Young Writers' Award, alongside Nikesh Shukla, editor of The Good Immigrant.

The screen rights to Bourne's debut adult novel How Do You Like Me Now? were optioned by production company Ecosse Films in 2017. Her 2018 young adult novel Are We All Lemmings and Snowflakes? has been optioned for television by Duck Soup Films.

She appeared at the Edinburgh International Book Festival in 2018, alongside author Cat Clarke, discussing her book Are We All Lemmings and Snowflakes?, mental health, and resolve. The event was chaired by author Alex Nye.

In 2019, the publisher Hodder acquired the rights to a further two adult novels from Bourne.

Bourne was one of the headlining authors of the 2019 London Book Fair, appearing as 'Children's Author of the Day' on the final day.

== Recognitions ==
Bourne was shortlisted for the 2018 YA Book Prize from The Bookseller and We Love This Book, rewarding the best fiction for teenagers and young adults from authors in the UK and Ireland, for her 2017 novel It Only Happens in the Movies.

Bourne is a former news journalist, and was nominated for Best Print Journalist of the Year in 2010 while working as a news reporter at the Surrey Mirror. She graduated from the University of Sheffield with a first-class degree in Journalism.

== Bibliography ==
=== Standalone novels ===
- Soulmates (2013)
- The Manifesto on How to be Interesting (2014)
- It Only Happens in the Movies (2017)
- How Do You Like Me Now? (2018)
- Floored, co-written with Eleanor Wood, Lisa Williamson, Melinda Salisbury, Non Pratt, Sara Barnard, and Tanya Byrne (2018)
- Are We All Lemmings and Snowflakes? (2018)
- The Places I've Cried in Public (2019)
- What Magic is This? (novella, 2019)
- Pretending (2020)
- The Yearbook (2021)
- Girl Friends (2022, UK) / When We Were Friends (2022, Canada)
- You could be so pretty (2023)
- So Thrilled For You (2025)

=== The Spinster Club series ===
- Am I Normal Yet? (2015)
- What's a Girl Gotta Do? (2016)
- How Hard Can Love Be? (2016)
- ...And a Happy New Year? (2016)
