= Emma Myers =

American actress (born 2002)

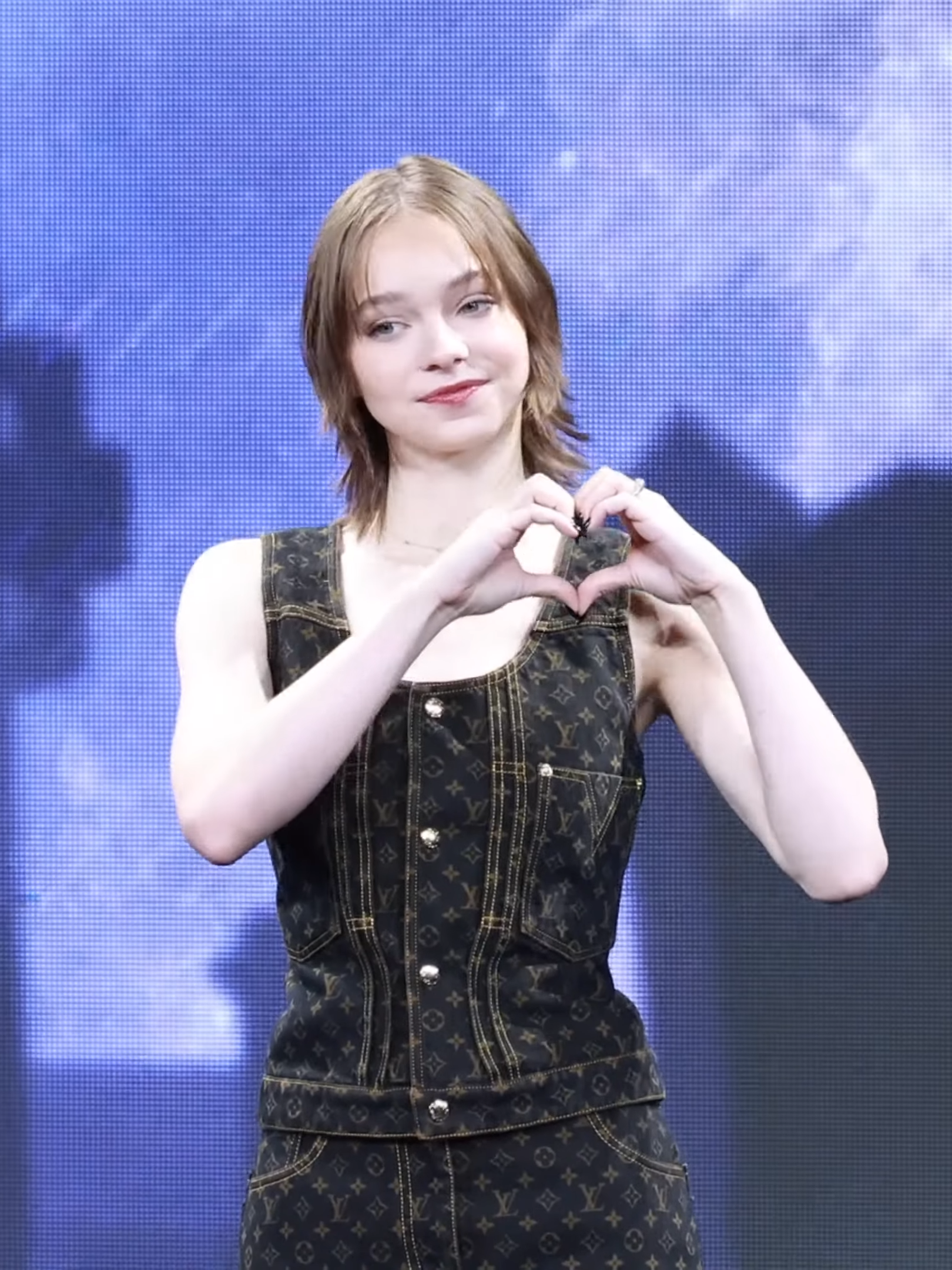
- Myers in 2025
- Born: Emma Elizabeth Myers; April 2, 2002 (age 24); Orlando, Florida, U.S.
- Occupation: Actress
- Years active: 2010–present

Emma Elizabeth Myers (born April 2, 2002) is an American actress. She is best known for her breakthrough role as Enid Sinclair in the Netflix series Wednesday (2022–present). She has since appeared in the television series A Good Girl's Guide to Murder (2024–present), and in films such as Family Switch (2023) and A Minecraft Movie (2025), with the latter earning her a Nickelodeon Kids' Choice Award. She was featured in the 2026 class of the Forbes 30 Under 30 list.

== Early life ==
Emma Elizabeth Myers was born on April 2, 2002 in Orlando, Florida. A child of two lawyers, she is the second of four sisters, all of whom attended a homeschool cooperative. She has Greek ancestry from her mother, and she has described her household and upbringing as Christian.

Initially wanting to be a dancer, Myers first showed interest in acting at age five, after having accompanied her older sister to auditions. She has said that finding a sense of community in her homeschool environment was difficult, though this was alleviated by her involvement in extracurricular activities such as dancing and local theater. At age 12, she took a hiatus from acting, during which she pivoted her focus to competitive dance. When she was 16, she and her family moved to Atlanta, Georgia, where she began to pursue acting more seriously.

In her youth, Myers became a fan of the emo and alternative bands Twenty One Pilots, Panic! at the Disco, and Fall Out Boy, as well as YouTube creators Dan and Phil. Myers has also expressed interest in K-pop, particularly the South Korean group Seventeen. She spent her free time playing adventure games such as Ace Attorney and Professor Layton, and was also part of online fandoms for the Star Wars and The Lord of the Rings franchises. Myers has cited that The Lord of the Rings film series as an inspiration for her interest in the pursuit of an acting career, and her love for fantasy.

== Career ==
=== 2010–2021: Initial roles ===
In 2010, Myers had minor roles in the drama film Letters to God, the A&E television series The Glades, and the short film Crooked. Following her acting hiatus from ages 12 to 16, she had more roles in the ABC television series The Baker and the Beauty, the Snap Originals series Dead of Night, the short film Deathless, and the Lifetime television film A Taste of Christmas, all in 2020. In 2021, she appeared in the Lifetime television film Girl in the Basement, which was inspired by the Fritzl kidnapping case.

=== 2022–present: Wednesday and breakthrough ===
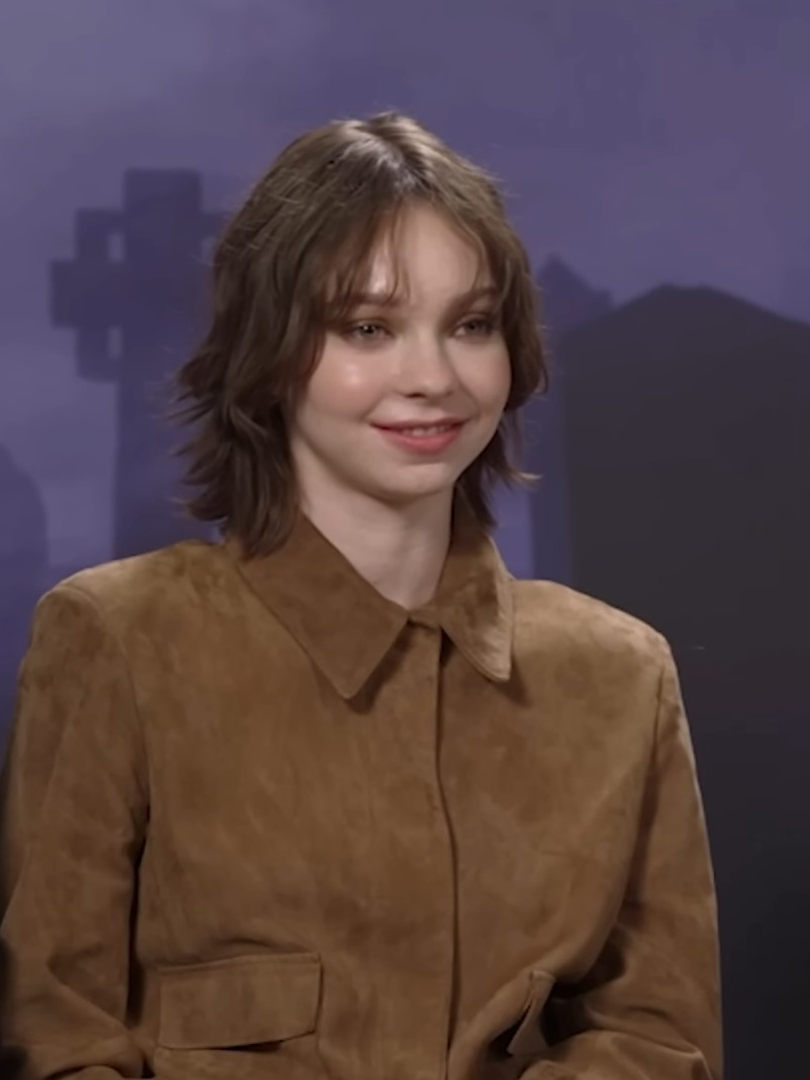
Myers promoting the second season of Wednesday in 2025

Myers made her breakthrough in 2022 when she appeared as Enid Sinclair in the Netflix series Wednesday, after initially auditioning for the titular role. She made her next appearance the following year in the film Southern Gospel (2023). Later that year, she starred as CC Walker in the Netflix body swap comedy Family Switch alongside Jennifer Garner, Ed Helms, and Brady Noon.

In 2024, Myers starred as the lead character, Pippa Fitz-Amobi, in the British mystery thriller television series A Good Girl's Guide to Murder, based on the novel of the same name. Reviewers praised her performance in the show, with The New York Times writing that "Myers's luminous performance beautifully and poignantly synthesizes [her character's] blend of panic, regret, embarrassment, determination, courage, fear and stubbornness".

In 2025, Myers starred as Natalie in the film A Minecraft Movie, based on the video game Minecraft. The role earned her the award for Favorite Butt-Kicker at the 2025 Kids' Choice Awards, in addition to a nomination for Favorite Movie Actress. Later that year, she voiced Chita in an episode of the third season of the Disney+ anthology series Star Wars: Visions.

In 2026, Forbes included Myers in that year's class of their annual 30 Under 30 list. She will voice June in the animated film The Angry Birds Movie 3, which is set to release in December 2026.

== Other ventures ==
Myers has partnered with brands such as the fashion houses Coach and Calvin Klein and the tech company Samsung. For GivingTuesday 2023, she partnered with American retailer Claire's in support of the nonprofit medical corporation St. Jude Children's Research Hospital.

== Personal life ==
Myers resides in Atlanta, Georgia. She was raised a Christian and continues to practice the religion into adulthood. She began experiencing severe insomnia after her rise to fame, and she has credited God with helping her through it. She has also struggled with social anxiety and panic attacks since she was a teenager.

== Filmography ==
Key
†	Denotes films that have not yet been released

=== Film ===
List of Emma Myers's film roles and appearances
Year	Title	Role	Notes	Ref.
2010	Letters to God	Girl on School Bus	Uncredited role	
2010	Crooked	Gym Girl	Short film	
2020	Deathless	Mavis Nebick	Short film	
2020	A Taste of Christmas	BeeBee Jordan	Television film	
2021	Girl in the Basement	Marie Cody	Television film	
2023	Southern Gospel	Angie Blackburn		
2023	Family Switch	CC Walker		
2025	A Minecraft Movie	Natalie		
2026	The Angry Birds Movie 3 †	June	Voice role	

=== Television ===
List of Emma Myers's television roles and appearances
Year	Title	Role	Notes	Ref.
2010	The Glades	Paige Slayton	Episode: "The Girlfriend Experience"	
2020	The Baker and the Beauty	Stephanie	Episode: "Pilot"	
2020	Dead of Night	The Girl from Magnolia	Two episodes	
2022–present	Wednesday	Enid Sinclair (Note: Myers also played Wednesday Addams in the season 2 episode "Woe Thyself", swapping roles with Jenna Ortega.)	Main role; 16 episodes	
2024–present	A Good Girl's Guide to Murder	Pippa "Pip" Fitz-Amobi	Lead role; 12 episodes	
2025	Star Wars: Visions	Chita	Voice role; episode: "The Smuggler"	

== Awards and nominations ==
List of Emma Myers's awards and nominations
Award	Year	Category	Work	Result	Ref.
Astra TV Awards	2026	Best Supporting Actress in a Comedy Series	Wednesday	Nominated	
Forbes 30 Under 30	2026	Hollywood & Entertainment	—N/a	Included	
Nickelodeon Kids' Choice Awards	2025	Favorite Butt-Kicker	A Minecraft Movie	Won	
Nickelodeon Kids' Choice Awards	2025	Favorite Movie Actress	A Minecraft Movie	Nominated	
OFTA Television Awards	2023	Best Supporting Actress in a Comedy Series	Wednesday	Nominated	
