= A Good Girl's Guide to Murder =

Novels by Holly Jackson, 2019–2021

- Author: Holly Jackson
- Genre: 12+ fiction, crime
- Publisher: Electric Monkey (UK); Delacorte Press (US)
- Publication date: 2 May 2019

A Good Girl's Guide to Murder is a young adult mystery crime debut novel by British author Holly Jackson. The novel is the first in a series of three novels and one novella: A Good Girl's Guide to Murder (2019); Good Girl, Bad Blood (2020); As Good As Dead (2021); and Kill Joy (2021). All books were published by Electric Monkey in the United Kingdom and by Delacorte Press in the United States and ONE Verlag in Germany.

The plot follows an investigation carried out by a 17 year old true crime enthusiast Pippa "Pip" Fitz-Amobi, a student in the fictional town of Little Kilton, Buckinghamshire. (Note: In the version published for the American market, this is changed to Fairview, Connecticut. The 2024 television adaptation uses the original Little Kilton setting.) In the novel, she investigates the murder of popular student Andrea "Andie" Bell and the suicide of the supposed perpetrator Salil "Sal" Singh under the guise of a school project. Her objectives are to exonerate Sal, who she is convinced was falsely accused, and to uncover the true perpetrator, who Pip believes is still at large.

A six-part television adaptation was released on BBC iPlayer on 1 July 2024, with Emma Myers playing Pip.

== Plot summary ==
Five years prior to the events of the book, a murder–suicide occurred in the small town of Little Kilton, Buckinghamshire when popular schoolgirl Andie Bell was brutally murdered. Andie's boyfriend, Sal Singh, while initially only a person of interest, was later believed to be the killer after ostensibly sending a text message confessing to the crime and then committed suicide. Seventeen-year-old Pippa "Pip" Fitz-Amobi, however, is convinced that Sal was innocent and that the real perpetrator is still free. She asks Sal's brother, Ravi, to help her with the investigation she has launched under the guise of an EPQ project. Ravi refuses after their first encounter, but later agrees to assist her. Each interrogation Pip carries out puts her in greater danger, yet she persists, even after she begins to receive violent threats in the form of both a written note and a string of text messages, and her dog Barney is stolen and drowned. She finds evidence that Andie was illegally selling drugs to students, including Sal's friend Max Hastings, and was being abused by Mr. Elliot Ward, a history teacher at Pip's school, and the father of Cara Ward, Pip's longstanding best friend.

Pip discovers that Mr. Ward had pushed Andie into a desk in a moment of fury. When Andie went missing, Mr. Ward, believing that he had killed her, murdered and framed Sal while staging his death to look like a suicide. Several days after Andie's death, Mr. Ward noticed a girl, Isla, walking through the street, and, mistaking her for Andie, kidnapped her and locked her in his attic.

Becca, Andie's sister, confesses that Max had drugged and raped her with Rohypnol sold to him by Andie. In anger, Becca had pushed Andie, who fell, convulsed and died. While still in shock, Becca had hidden Andie's body in an old septic tank in a farmhouse near Pip's home. Becca also admits that, while the written note that threatened Pip to "stop digging" was written by Mr. Ward, she was responsible for the aggressive anonymous text messages that Pip received afterwards. When Pip attempts to confront Becca for her actions, she is drugged and almost strangled to death by Becca, but is saved by Ravi.

With the truth now public, Sal is posthumously exonerated, and Becca and Mr. Ward are arrested for their roles in the double-homicide, while Max is charged with having raped multiple girls, including Becca.

== Reception ==
A Good Girl's Guide to Murder was named one of the best books of 2020 by Barnes and Noble and received the following accolades:

- American Library Association's Amazing Audiobooks for Young Adults (2021)
- Goodreads Choice Award Nominee for Young Adult Fiction (2020)
- YA Book Prize shortlist (2020)
- British Book Awards Children's Fiction Book Winner of the Year (2020)

== Sequels and prequel ==
=== Good Girl, Bad Blood (2020) ===
Pip, after having created a podcast called A Good Girl's Guide To Murder based on the events that took place in the previous novel, is being hailed online as an aspiring detective. In spite of this, Pip promises to herself that she will never take on another case after having lost her beloved dog Barney, and so narrowly having avoided death herself, in her prior case. She is also upset following Max Hastings’ acquittal for the rapes he committed, knowing he is truly guilty of them. Her friend Connor Reynolds approaches her, asking for an investigation of the case of his missing brother, Jamie Reynolds. Pip initially refuses, instead putting in a word with DI Hawkins, an officer, but when the police take no action, she decides that she will investigate one last case, citing a feeling that Jamie had not simply run away, but rather had been abducted.

Pip starts digging into Jamie's past and present, conducting interviews and piecing together clues. As she gets closer to the truth she realizes that Jamie's case is connected to something dark and dangerous. Furthermore, it seems as though somebody is always one step ahead of her and trying to stop her from uncovering the truth.

Pip discovers that Jamie was talking to a catfish going by the alias 'Layla Mead', who used a photo of a schoolmate named Stella Chapman. After extensive research Pip learns that the catfish was after someone referred to as 'Child Brunswick' by the media, the child of Scott Brunswick, who unwillingly assisted his father in multiple child murders. She eventually figures out that Child Brunswick is local Fairview/Little Kilton newspaper worker, Stanley Forbes.

She also figures out that Forbes had abducted Jamie after Layla had sent Jamie to murder him if he reacted to the words 'Child Brunswick', along with Luke Eaton, who was Natalie Da Silva's boyfriend at the time, and who was cheating on her with Layla. Pip, Ravi, and Connor set out to get Jamie back, which involves getting Stanley out of his house. Pip pretends to be Layla and leads him out to the old farmhouse, located near the place where Andie Bell's body was dumped in the previous novel. After initially hiding, she is forced to confront him to prevent him from leaving.

She reveals to him that she is not Layla and that she knows everything, but isn't there to blackmail him. He talks about his father and his story. Charlie Green, Pip's neighbour, then joins them, and asks for Pip's phone to text his wife. When Pip hands it to him, he places it into his pocket and asks Stanley for his. Stanley is hesitant until Charlie pulls out a gun and threatens him. Charlie shares how he was actually the brother of the youngest victim of Scott Brunswick and how he had hunted Stanley down to end his life.

Stanley tries to apologise for helping his father, even though he was forced to. Charlie doesn't accept this and raises his weapon. Pippa begs him to stop, but he doesn't and shoots Stanley. She desperately tries to stop the bleeding and keep him alive before realising that Charlie has set the building on fire. She bravely manages to drag Stanley out of the house, though tragically once outside, finds that he has died.

She attempts CPR, before the emergency services arrive and paramedics step in and ultimately end up declaring him deceased. Pip is taken to the police department for questioning and to rule her out as a suspect in Stanley's murder.

Later, a funeral for Stanley is held. Pip tries to make a speech, but is rudely interrupted by a group of individuals protesting against Stanley. This enrages Pip, and she storms over to the protesters, yelling at them and destroying a few of their signs before being dragged away.

The book ends at a barbecue with the Reynolds, which Jamie Reynolds jokes is a Surprise! I'm not dead! party. It starts to show the effects Stanley's death had on Pip for the first time.

=== As Good As Dead (2021) ===
Following the events of Good Girl, Bad Blood, Pip has been left psychologically traumatised, implied to have PTSD, and is unable to sleep at night. With her life already at an all-time low, things take a turn for the worse when she becomes the target of a relentless, anonymous stalker. The stalker sends her constant messages, asking her the same question: "Who will look for you when you're the one that disappears?" At first Pip tries to brush off the threats, hoping that it's just a troll, but as the messages become more frequent and the stalker's presence looms closer and closer to her home, she begins to realise that the danger is real, imminent, and inescapable. Despite her pleas, the police refuse to take her seriously, leaving Pip to face the stalker alone.

Armed with two past experiences in solving murders and uncovering the truth, Pip starts to dig deeper into the mystery using her own resources and contacts, interviewing people and following leads. But the further she goes, the more she realises that the stalker is someone who is closely tied to her past cases and has a vendetta against her. She eventually notices connections between her stalker and a misogynistic serial killer known as the DT Killer, a man named Billy Karras, who was imprisoned for his crimes six years ago. However, his mother insists that Billy is innocent and was coerced into a confession by the police. Pip suspects the that the real DT Killer is still on the loose and is after her.

After interviewing the sister of one of the DT Killer's victims, who was friends with Andie Bell before her death, Pip learns that Andie had a secret email to communicate with her. After hacking it, she discovers an unsent email draft saying that she knew who the DT Killer is and that she sold drugs to use the money to help her and Becca escape him. The draft also reveals that Andie knew the DT Killer was someone close to her family, and Pip suspects it is either Daniel da Silva (one of Jason Bell's former employees) or Jason Bell himself.

Pip heads to Da Silva's house to interrogate him, but is kidnapped by Jason Bell, who reveals himself as her stalker and the real DT Killer. Pip manages to overpower and kill him. However, she believes that the police will not believe her story and will charge her with murder, so she and Ravi decide to frame Max Hastings for his killing, believing putting him in prison will serve as justice for the rapes he was acquitted of.

They plant Jason’s corpse in the trunk of his own car and then activate the heater and the air conditioning to confuse the time of death. While Ravi goes to spend time with his cousin as an alibi, and takes the back roads where there are no cameras while his phone is off, Pip has Nat da Silva, another victim of Max, distract him while she plants the evidence in his house, then gets herself an alibi. Later, Max is arrested and accuses Pip of having framed him, and the police seem suspicious, but as there is no evidence of a frame-up and the police already know of Max having raped multiple women, he is charged. Pip tells Ravi they cannot see each other until the trial is over, as he is the only other person who knows the full story and the police may take a closer look if they continue to associate, and breaks up with him and goes to university. DNA evidence later leads the police to posthumously declare Jason Bell as the DT Killer, and Billy Karras is exonerated.

In the epilogue, it is implied that Max is found guilty, and Pip and Ravi resume their relationship.

=== Kill Joy (2021) ===
Kill Joy is a prequel novella set shortly prior to events of the first book in the series. Pip is invited to a friend's birthday party, set up to be a 1920s themed murder mystery dinner. At first Pip is not excited about the idea of a mock murder investigation and would much rather stay home and work on her school project for the upcoming academic year, but she decides to attend for the sake of her friends.

As the night wears on though, Pip finds herself drawn into the investigation surrounding the fictional murder case of Reginald Remy. Using her sharp intellect and keen eye for detail, she pieces together the clues and is soon caught up in this game of intrigue and deception, finding herself becoming more and more invested in the case, and is determined to be the one to crack it open and uncover the truth.

As the night comes to a close Pip is left with the realisation that she is unable to resist the pull of the unknown, and that perhaps this game is not just a game but a prelude to a bigger, more important, real-life investigation into a locally infamous tragic murder-suicide that she could perhaps try her hand at solving.

=== Reception of sequels ===
Good Girl, Bad Blood was shortlisted for the 2021 YA Book Prize.

As Good As Dead received a positive review from The Guardian, who named the book "a taut, compulsively readable, elegantly plotted thriller."

== Adaptation ==
In September 2022 it was revealed that BBC Three had commissioned a television adaptation from Moon-age Pictures, penned by Poppy Cogan. In June 2023 the author, Jackson, revealed that production of the television series had started, and announced that Emma Myers and Zain Iqbal were cast as the respective lead roles of Pip and Ravi. In March 2024 she shared a small clip of the show with a July 2024 release date. This adaptation was released on Netflix in the U.S. and the majority of other territories except the UK, Ireland, Germany, Australia, and New Zealand, on August 1, 2024.
