= Lisa Williamson (writer) =

English writer

- Born: 5 February 1980 (age 46); Nottingham, England
- Other name: Lisa Cassidy
- Education: Middlesex University
- Years active: 2014–present
- Website: www.lisawilliamsonauthor.com

Lisa Williamson (born 5 February 1980) is an English author and former actress. Her debut novel The Art of Being Normal won a 2016 Waterstones Children's Book Prize for Older Fiction. Her work has been shortlisted for two YA Book Prizes.

== Early life ==
Williamson was born in Nottingham and grew up nearby in Arnold. She graduated with a degree in Drama from Middlesex University.

== Career ==
Williamson began her career as an actress under the stage name Lisa Cassidy, appearing in a number of pantomimes and the 2014 John Lewis Christmas advert. Between acting gigs, Williamson worked temp jobs. One of these jobs in gender identity services for young people from 2010 to 2012, in which she audio-typed therapy session notes. This experience inspired Williamson's debut young adult novel The Art of Being Normal, told from the perspective of a transgender teenager. Published in 2015 via David Fickling Books and praised for its exploration of the topic, The Art of Being Normal became a Sunday Times bestseller and won the 2016 Waterstones Children's Book Prize in the Older Fiction category. It also won a Leeds Book Award in the 14–16 category and was shortlisted for the Branford Boase Award and the YA Book Prize.

This was followed by Williamson's second novel All About Mia in 2017, which explores sibling dynamics, and her third novel Paper Avalanche, which subverts the messy teenager stereotype with a hoarder mother and neat daughter, in 2019, both published by David Fickling Books. The latter was longlisted for the 2020 Carnegie Medal and named children's book of the week in The Sunday Times at the start of 2020 by Nicolette Jones. In addition, Williamson collaborated on the 2018 novel Floored with Sara Barnard, Holly Bourne, Tanya Byrne, Non Pratt, and Eleanor Wood.

Williamson reunited with David Fickling Books once again for the publication of her fourth novel First Day of My Life, which Jones of The Sunday Times once named again children's book of the week in January 2021. She first came up with the idea for the novel in 2016 before rewriting it in 2019. First Day of My Life was shortlisted for the 2022 YA Book Prize.

In 2023, Williamson moved into middle grade fiction with the Bigg School series, acquired by Guppy Books, starting with Best Friends Forever. She wrote the series for her 11-year-old self, who struggled as she made the move from primary school to secondary school due to a lack of confidence. The subsequent books in the series Double Drama and Secret Crush were published in 2024.

== Bibliography ==
=== Young adult ===
- The Art of Being Normal (2015)
- All About Mia (2017)
- Floored (2018) (co-written with six other authors)
- Paper Avalanche (2019)
- First Day of My Life (2021)

=== Middle grade ===
==== Bigg School ====
- Best Friends Forever (2023)
- Double Drama (2024)
- Secret Crush (2024)
- Scaredy Cat (2025)

=== Biographies ===
- First Names: Malala Yousafzai (2020)
- First Names: Dwayne ('The Rock' Johnson) (2022)
- The Mysterious Life of Dr Barry: A Surgeon Unlike Any Other (2024)

=== Short stories ===
- "Routes and Wings" in I'll Be Home for Christmas (2016)

== Accolades ==
Year	Award	Category	Title	Result	Ref.
2016	Waterstones Children's Book Prize	Older Fiction	The Art of Being Normal	Won	
2016	Leeds Book Awards	14–16	The Art of Being Normal	Won	
2016	YA Book Prize		The Art of Being Normal	Shortlisted	
2016	Branford Boase Award		The Art of Being Normal	Shortlisted	
2020	Carnegie Medal		Paper Avalanche	Longlisted	
2022	YA Book Prize		First Day of My Life	Shortlisted	
