= Holly Jackson =

English writer (born 1992)

- Born: 6 December 1992 (age 33); Buckinghamshire, England
- Education: University of Nottingham
- Occupation: Novelist
- Writing career
- Genres: Young adult; mystery
- Notable work: A Good Girl's Guide to Murder

Holly Jackson (born 6 December 1992) is a British author of mystery novels. She is best known for her A Good Girl's Guide to Murder series.

== Early life ==
Holly Jackson grew up in Buckinghamshire, England, and wrote her first novel when she was 15 years old.

After attending Dr Challoner's High School, a grammar school for girls in Little Chalfont, Buckinghamshire, she attended the University of Nottingham, where she first studied literary linguistics and creative writing, graduating with a first class degree, then graduating with a master's degree in English.

== Personal life ==
Jackson married her husband in October 2023. They live together in London with their dog.

== Career ==
Jackson's debut novel, A Good Girl's Guide to Murder, was published in 2019. She followed this up with two sequel novels and one prequel novella: Good Girl, Bad Blood (2020), As Good as Dead (2021), and Kill Joy (2021), respectively. Apart from Good Girl, Bad Blood, all books were published by Electric Monkey. Good Girl, Bad Blood was published by Delacorte Press and was shortlisted for the 2021 YA Book Prize.

In 2022, Jackson released her first standalone novel, titled Five Survive, published in the UK by Electric Monkey and in the US by Delacorte Press.

In 2024, she released her second standalone novel, The Reappearance of Rachel Price, published in the UK by Electric Monkey and in the US by Delacorte Press.

In July 2025, Jackson published her debut adult suspense novel, Not Quite Dead Yet, in the US by Ballantine Books, in the UK by Michael Joseph Ltd, and in Canada by Doubleday.

== Reception ==
Jackson's first novel A Good Girl's Guide to Murder, received the following accolades:

- American Library Association's Amazing Audiobooks for Young Adults (2021)
- Goodreads Choice Award Nominee for Young Adult Fiction (2020)
- Shortlisted for the YA Book Prize (2020)
- Waterstones Children's Book Prize for Older Fiction Finalist (2020)
- British Book Awards Children's Fiction Book Winner of the Year (2020)
- Barnes and Noble Best Books of the Year (2020)

The Times reported that Jackson was "Britain's bestselling female crime writer in 2024".

== Bibliography ==
=== A Good Girl's Guide to Murder series ===
- A Good Girl's Guide to Murder (2019)
- Good Girl, Bad Blood (2020)
- As Good as Dead (2021)
- Kill Joy (2021, novella)

=== Standalone novels ===
- Five Survive (2023)
- The Reappearance of Rachel Price (2024)
- Not Quite Dead Yet (2025)
