= Cultural references to Hamlet =

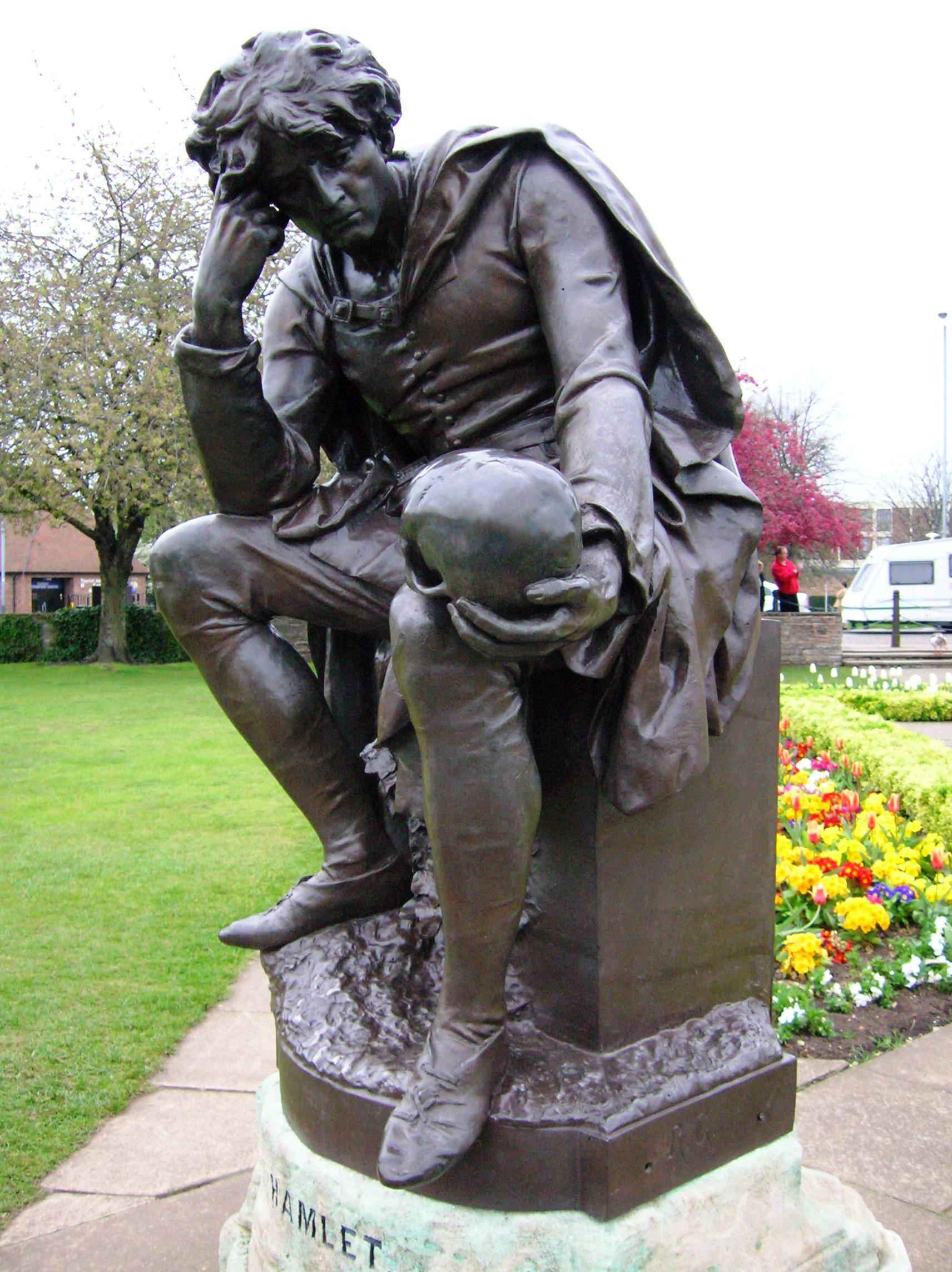
Prince Hamlet holding the skull of Yorick. 19th century statue by Ronald Gower in Stratford-upon-Avon

Numerous cultural references to Hamlet (in film, literature, arts, etc.) reflect the continued influence of this play. Hamlet is one of the most popular of Shakespeare's plays, topping the list at the Royal Shakespeare Company since 1879, as of 2004.

== Plays ==
The following list of plays including references to Hamlet is ordered alphabetically.

- The Reduced Shakespeare Company's The Compleat Wrks of Wllm Shkspr (Abridged), has been performed in versions where Hamlet is done in about 43 seconds.
- James Ijames' play Fat Ham is a modern adaptation of Hamlet set in the American South. Hamlet in this play is a young black gay man. The play won the Pulitzer Prize for Drama in 2022.
- The comedy Fortinbras covers the beginnings of the Norwegian Prince Fortinbras's reign in Denmark immediately following the events of Hamlet. Fortinbras is experiencing difficulty assuming the crown; Horatio attempts to get Fortinbras to tell Hamlet's story; other characters (Hamlet, Polonius, Ophelia, etc.) haunt Fortinbras as ghosts.
- Paul Rudnick's I Hate Hamlet (1991), tells the story of a TV actor from Los Angeles who gets talked into doing Hamlet for Shakespeare in the Park in New York. He rents Shakespearean actor John Barrymore's old apartment, and is soon haunted by the ghost of Barrymore himself.
- W. S. Gilbert's Rosencrantz and Guildenstern (1891) is a parody on Hamlet. Gilbert himself took the role of Claudius in a 1904 production of his play.
- Tom Stoppard's Rosencrantz and Guildenstern Are Dead (1966), tells the story of Hamlet from the perspective of two minor characters in Shakespeare's play. He has also written other Hamlet-inspired drama, including Dogg's Hamlet and The Fifteen-Minute Hamlet.
- Anton Chekhov's plays The Seagull and The Cherry Orchard include elements from Hamlet.
- In Kate Hamill's adaptation of Jane Austen's Sense and Sensibility, Edward Ferrars recites "To be or not the be" to the Dashwoods, instead of a William Cowper poem like in the novel.
- Richard Curtis's parody Skinhead Hamlet (1982), consists of about 600, mostly rude, words. "To be or not to be" becomes "To fuck or be fucked".
- In the musical Something Rotten! Hamlet is the play that Nostradamus sees in the future as Shakespeare's biggest play, but instead of 'Hamlet', he misinterprets it to be called 'Omelette'.

== Film and television ==
=== Film ===
The following list is ordered alphabetically.

- Egyptian director Youssef Chahine has included elements from Hamlet in his films. Alexandria... Why? (1978) feature performances of soliloquies from the play. In Alexandria Again and Forever (1990), Hamlet appears as a film within the film.
- Akira Kurosawa's The Bad Sleep Well is generally felt to borrow important plot elements from Hamlet.
- The 2006 Chinese film The Banquet (also known as Legend of the Black Scorpion) has a storyline loosely based on the story of Hamlet.
- In the Star Wars film The Empire Strikes Back, Chewbacca tries to reassemble the body of the robot C-3PO. At one point, he holds C-3PO's head in much the same way that Hamlet is traditionally depicted as holding Yorick's skull. This reference was intentional on the part of the director.
- In Ingmar Bergman's Fanny and Alexander, Hamlet is strongly alluded to. The children's father is rehearsing the part of the Ghost for a production of the play when he dies, and then appears to Alexander later in the film as an actual ghost. The play's plot is also referenced in other ways, including Alexander's hatred for and confrontation with his new stepfather. A character explicitly tells Alexander that he is not Hamlet.
- In the 2008 comedy Hamlet 2 a teacher creates a sequel to Hamlet in an effort to save his school's drama program. Apart from some of the names of his characters, there are very few similarities to the original.
- Shakespeare has been used as a base for pornographic parody film. One example is Luca Damiano's Hamlet: For the Love of Ophelia Parts 1 and 2 (1996).
- The plot of the 2012 Indian Malayalam drama Karmayogi ("The Warrior") is adapted from Hamlet. According to Shakespeare scholar Poonam Trivedi, Shakespeare "has many affinities with an Indian 'classical vision of art'..."
- Last Action Hero (1993) includes elements from the play, with Arnold Schwarzenegger appearing as an action-version of Hamlet.
- Themes and plot elements from the Disney's The Lion King are inspired by Hamlet.
- The horror movie A Nightmare on Elm Street alludes to Hamlet in connection with the protagonist Nancy.
- In the psychological drama The Ninth Configuration, characters discuss Hamlet at length, and asylum-inmates intends to do a production of the play with dogs.
- In Claude Chabrol's Ophélia, the protagonist becomes convinced that his family's history and current circumstances parallel those of Hamlet.
- In both the musical and the 2005 film adaptation of The Producers, Max Bialystock's musical version of Hamlet, Funny Boy, closes on opening night, one of his many failures.
- Hamlet features prominently in Renaissance Man, in which a reluctant teacher uses its plot and characters to introduce a group of under-achieving soldiers to critical thinking.
- Rosencrantz and Guildenstern Are Undead is a 2009 American independent vampire film. The film's title refers to a play-within-the-movie, which is a comic reinterpretation of Shakespeare's Hamlet and its aftermath.
- In Soapdish, Jeffrey Anderson (Kevin Kline) expresses his desire to perform a One-Man Hamlet, which he justifies by saying the whole thing is happening in Hamlet's head, so you only need one actor.
- The title for Star Trek VI: The Undiscovered Country (1991) is a reference to the soliloquy in Act 3, Scene 1. The Klingons Gorkon and Chang are Shakespeare aficionados, and opines that Shakespearian works are best experienced in the 'original' Klingon. Shakespeare's plays are liberally quoted throughout the film. In 1996, The Klingon Hamlet, a translation of the play into the constructed Klingon language was published, and parts of it have been performed by the Washington Shakespeare Company.
- The 1983 comedy Strange Brew is loosely based on Hamlet. Prince Hamlet is represented by Pam, daughter of a murdered brewery-owner whose spirit haunts the brewery's electrical system.
- In the 1995 comedy Billy Madison, Billy Madison and Eric reenact To be, or not to be to settle their feud with the winner getting to take over Madison Hotels.
- Both film versions of To Be or Not to Be (Ernst Lubitsch's in 1942 and Mel Brooks' in 1983) heavily alludes to the play.
- The cult British comedy Withnail and I quotes and alludes to the play.
- The title and elements in Alfred Hitchcock's 1959 North by Northwest has been seen as references to the play.
- Hamlet Goes Business (Hamlet liikemaailmassa) (1987), written and directed by Aki Kaurismäki, is a comic reworking of the story as a power struggle in a rubber duck factory.
- In the 2009 children's film Coraline Hamlet's "What a piece of work is man" soliloquy is recited as part of a circus act.
- Tony Olmos' 2023 film Hemet, or the Landlady Don't Drink Tea was said to be like Hamlet set in California.

=== Television ===
==== Comedy and cartoons ====
Sitcoms alluding to Hamlet include Gilligan's Island, Happy Days, Skins, Mystery Science Theater 3000, Frasier and Upstart Crow.

Cartoons include The Simpsons, South Park, Animaniacs and The Brak Show, Looney Tunes shorts A Ham in a Role and A Witch's Tangled Hare.

==== Drama ====
- The Canadian series Slings and Arrows' title is from Hamlet, and the first season follows a production of the play. The play's artistic director is haunted by the ghost of his predecessor.
- The Royals television series uses the Hamlet story as its basis for the soap opera for its royal family, and infighting to gain the crown.
- The Sons of Anarchy series draws many elements from the play and has been described as "Hamlet on motorcycles".
- The Pakistani television series Sang-e-Mah is loosely based on the play, with some additional subplots.

==== Horror ====
- In the 1991 Tales from the Crypt episode "Top Billing", a struggling actor commits murder for the role of Hamlet, only to realize he was actually auditioning for the role of Yorick.

==== Mystery and detective shows ====
- The British detective drama Lewis has referenced Shakespeare, including Hamlet, more than once.
- A 2008 episode of the anime-series Black Butler features a production of Hamlet.

==== Science fiction ====
- An episode of the original Star Trek series, entitled "The Conscience of the King" (1966) features a production of Hamlet, and alludes to the play in other aspects.
- In an episode of Star Trek: The Next Generation entitled "Hide and Q" (1987), the god-like entity Q is quoting Shakespeare to Captain Jean-Luc Picard to justify his tormenting of humanity, and Picard counters him with an earnest quotation of Hamlet's "What a piece of work is man" speech.
- Hamlet has been referenced in Doctor Who. In The Chase (1965), the Doctor and his companions watch as Francis Bacon gives Shakespeare the idea to write a play about Hamlet. In City of Death (1979), the Doctor claims to have written down Shakespeare's original draft of Hamlet due to the Bard's sprained wrist, but criticises the mixed metaphor "To take arms against a sea of troubles." In The Shakespeare Code (2007), the Doctor meets Shakespeare and quotes the play, saying "the play's the thing." Later on, Shakespeare coins the phrase "to be or not to be." The Doctor suggests he write it down, but Shakespeare remarks that it is "too pretentious."

== Radio ==
- Alan Bennett wrote a play for television called Denmark Hill, which sets Hamlet in "a leafy south London suburb" in the 1980s. The TV-play was unproduced, but later broadcast as a radio-play.
- Kenneth Brannagh directed and recorded for a radio drama adaptation for Hamlet, for BBC Radio.

== Literature ==
=== Books ===
- In Chapter XXI of the Adventures of Huckleberry Finn by Mark Twain, a parody of the soliloquy is recited by the Duke, one of a pair of con artists encountered by Huck and Jim, albeit with other Shakespearean references as well ("Birnam Wood", "Wake Duncan" and others).
- The ninth chapter of James Joyce's Ulysses, commonly referred to as Scylla and Charybdis, is almost entirely devoted to a rambling discourse by Stephen Daedalus on Shakespeare, centering on the character Hamlet. As a character predicts more or less accurately in the very first chapter, "[Daedalus] proves by algebra that Hamlet's grandson is Shakespeare's grandfather and that he himself is the ghost of his own father."
- Gertrude and Claudius, a John Updike novel, serves as a prequel to the events of the play. It follows Gertrude from her wedding to King Hamlet, through an affair with Claudius, and its murderous results, up until the very beginning of the play.
- The Dead Fathers Club, a novel by Matt Haig, retells the story of Hamlet from the point of view of an 11-year-old boy in modern England.
- Anton Chekhov wrote a feuilleton titled I am a Moscow Hamlet (1891), the mutterings of a gossip-mongering actor who contemplates suicide out of sheer boredom.
- Brazilian author Oswald de Andrade wrote Tupi or not Tupi, that is the question in 1928.
- Jasper Fforde's novel Something Rotten includes Hamlet – transplanted from the BookWorld into reality – as a major character. This version of Hamlet frets about how audiences perceive him, complains about the performances of actors who have portrayed him, and at one point resolves to go back and change the play by killing Claudius in the beginning and marrying Ophelia.
- In Kurt Vonnegut's 1965 novel, God Bless You, Mr. Rosewater, the protagonist, Eliot Rosewater, writes a letter to his wife while pretending to be Hamlet.
- David Bergantino's novel Hamlet II: Ophelia's Revenge, set in modern Denmark, portrays Ophelia rising from the dead to get revenge on Hamlet.
- Nick O'Donohoe's 1989 science fiction novel Too Too Solid Flesh portrays a troupe of android actors designed specifically to perform Hamlet; when the androids' designer is murdered, the Hamlet android decides to investigate.
- In Kyle Baker's 1996 graphic novel The Cowboy Wally Show, Cowboy Wally's masterpiece is the film Cowboy Wally's HAMLET, a modernized version produced in secret while Wally is in prison. Wally plans to film Hamlet professionally, but is jailed for an unspecified offense before he can cast actors, and so uses his cellmates as the cast.
- David Foster Wallace's novel Infinite Jest takes its name from Hamlet's speech about Yorick, and features a main character struggling with his uncle's influence following the suspicious death of his father.
- The plot of David Wroblewski's novel The Story of Edgar Sawtelle closely follows the story line of Hamlet, and several of the novel's main characters have names similar to their corresponding characters in the play.
- John Marsden's Hamlet: A Novel is a reinterpretation of the original for young adults. It is set in Denmark and the characters keep their names, their personalities and their functions in the story.
- In A Christmas Carol, Charles Dickens underscores Jacob Marley's death by an analogy to Hamlet:
  There is no doubt that Marley was dead. This must be distinctly understood, or nothing wonderful can come of the story I am going to relate. If we were not perfectly convinced that Hamlet's Father died before the play began, there would be nothing more remarkable in his taking a stroll at night, in an easterly wind, upon his own ramparts, than there would be in any other middle-aged gentleman rashly turning out after dark in a breezy spot … literally to astonish his son's weak mind.
  — Charles Dickens, A Christmas Carol
- Ngaio Marsh's detective Roderick Alleyn often talks and thinks of Hamlet in her novels.
- Pamela Dean's novel Tam Lin prominently features a production of the play which her characters attend and discuss.
- The book To Be or Not to Be by Ryan North uses the play as its core, rendering it as a branching narrative based on the Choose Your Own Adventure series and other gamebooks. The reader is able to follow the play's plot by following the "Yorick Skulls", or to take it in wildly different directions, including bypassing the story altogether.
- Ian McEwan's novel Nutshell (2016) retells the play from the point of view of an unborn child.
- Prince Hamlet is the main character in the 2010 comic book Kill Shakespeare.
- Hamlet: Manga Classics, written by Crystal Chan and illustrated by Julien Choy, adapts the story of the play into a Manga format.

=== Poetry ===
- The line, "Good night, ladies, good night, sweet ladies, good night, good night," ends the second part of T. S. Eliot's The Waste Land.
- T.S. Eliot's poem, "The Love Song of J. Alfred Prufrock", includes the line, "No! I am not Prince Hamlet, nor was I meant to be".
- The poem The Night Before Christmas includes the line "Not a creature was stirring, not even a mouse." This may derive from Act 1 Scene 1's "Not a mouse stirring."
- The poem "Hamlet" by Boris Pasternak opens the collection of poetry in the novel Dr Zhivago attributed to the title character.
- Zbigniew Herbert’s "Tren Fortynbrasa", or “Elegy of Fortinbras” in English, is a poem written in the perspective of Prince Fortinbras, who is examining the destructive aftermath of the play's final act.

=== Short stories ===
- In the short story "Much Ado About (Censored)" by Connie Willis, a pair of high school students volunteer to help their teacher edit the play in a satire on political correctness.
- "In the Halls of Elsinore", a short story by Brad C. Hodson, takes place in an Elsinore occupied by Fortinbras. Told from Horatio's point of view, the story is about a malignant presence that resides in Elsinore – the same presence that appeared to young Hamlet as his father.
- Margaret Atwood's 1992 collection Good Bones and Simple Murders includes "Gertrude Talks Back," in which Hamlet's mother responds to Hamlet's harsh criticism during Act III, Scene 4, and reveals that it wasn't Claudius who killed his father: "It was me."

== Music ==
=== Opera ===
Several operas have been written based on Hamlet, including:

- Ambleto by Francesco Gasparini (1706). Though the creators probably were aware of Shakespeare's work, this opera is based on Gesta Danorum.
- Amleto by Domenico Scarlatti (1715)
- Amleto by Gaetano Andreozzi (1792)
- Amleto by Franco Faccio (libretto by Arrigo Boito) (1865)
- Hamlet by Ambroise Thomas (1868)
- Hamlet by Humphrey Searle (1968)
- Hamlet by Sándor Szokolay (1968)
- Hamlet by Sergei Slonimsky (1990)
- Hamlet by Brett Dean (2017)

=== Instrumental ===
Instrumental works based on Hamlet include:

- Hector Berlioz – Funeral March for Hamlet (orchestra) and Mort d'Ophélie (chorus). Berlioz did several other Shakespeare-inspired works.
- Frank Bridge – There is a willow, impression for orchestra
- Frédéric Chopin – Nocturne in G minor, Op. 15, No. 3, said to have been inspired by Hamlet
- Joseph Joachim – Hamlet Ouverture (1853)
- Guillaume Lekeu – Hamlet symphonic study, Marche d'Ophélie
- Franz Liszt – Hamlet (1858), symphonic poem
- Edward MacDowell – Hamlet and Ophelia, symphonic poem
- Sergei Prokofiev – Hamlet, incidental music Op. 77 (1937–38)
- Pyotr Ilyich Tchaikovsky – Hamlet, Overture-Fantasy in F minor, Op. 67 (1888) and 17 items of incidental music to a production of Hamlet in St Petersburg, February 1891, Op. 67a.

=== Contemporary ===
Contemporary popular music mentions include:

- Hair: The Tribal Love-Rock Musical (1967) by James Rado and Jerome Ragni, contains the song "What A Piece of Work Is Man", which is taken completely from Hamlet and set to music by Galt MacDermot.
- "Cruel to Be Kind" is a 1979 single by Nick Lowe. The title of the song is taken from Hamlet, Act III, Scene 4: "I must be cruel only to be kind. Thus bad begins and worse remains behind."
- Steampunk band Abney Park recorded a song entitled "Dear Ophelia", in which the vocalist sings as Prince Hamlet, and apologizes to Ophelia for all the things he had done, even telling the story of his father, who died when "his brother crept out, and poured poison in his ear"
- The title track of the album Elsinore by Swedish musician Björn Afzelius is about a prince locked up in the castle of Elsinore.
- The title track off of the 2017 album To Kill a King, by American heavy metal band Manilla Road is based on Hamlet.
- The Birthday Party recorded a song called "Hamlet (Pow Pow Pow)" on the Junkyard album.
- The Dream Theater song "Pull Me Under" is influenced by, and makes reference to, Hamlet.
- "Hey There Ophelia" is the thirteenth track off the album, This Gigantic Robot Kills by MC Lars. It features lyrics about Ophelia, Claudius, and Hamlet's father's ghost from Hamlet's point of view.
- The Serbian hard rock band, Riblja Čorba, released an album entitled Ostalo je ćutanje (trans. "The Rest Is Silence") in 1996. Album features a track entitled "Nešto je trulo u državi Danskoj" (trans. "Something's Rotten in the State of Denmark"), the song itself referring to Serbia. Album cover features band's frontman Bora Đorđević holding a skull.
- Richard Thompson, British singer/songwriter, sings a live version of the story of Hamlet on "The Life And Music Of – CD 4 – The Songs Pour Down Like Silver". The interpretation is not terribly serious ("Like a hole in the head, Denmark needed that prince").
- Suicide is Painless from the film and TV-series M*A*S*H, written by Mike Altman, contains the line "Is it to be, or not to be?"
- Opheliac by Emilie Autumn, features two songs referring to the play. The title track and "Liar".

== Video games ==
- Hamlet, a 2003 interactive text game by Robin Johnson
- Hamlet, a 2010 point-and-click adventure game by Denis Galanin
- To Be or Not to Be, a 2015 video game adaptation of the book of the same name
- Elsinore, a 2019 time travel game by Golden Glitch
- Balatro, a 2024 rougelike deck-building game, features a joker card based on Yorick

== Other ==
The play has contributed many phrases to common English vernacular, including the famous "To be, or not to be".

It (as well as the Shakespearean canon as a whole) is frequently given as an example of a text which would be reproduced under the conditions of the infinite monkey theorem.

== Gallery ==
Artworks inspired by the play includes works by Eugène Delacroix, Henrietta Rae and William Blake.

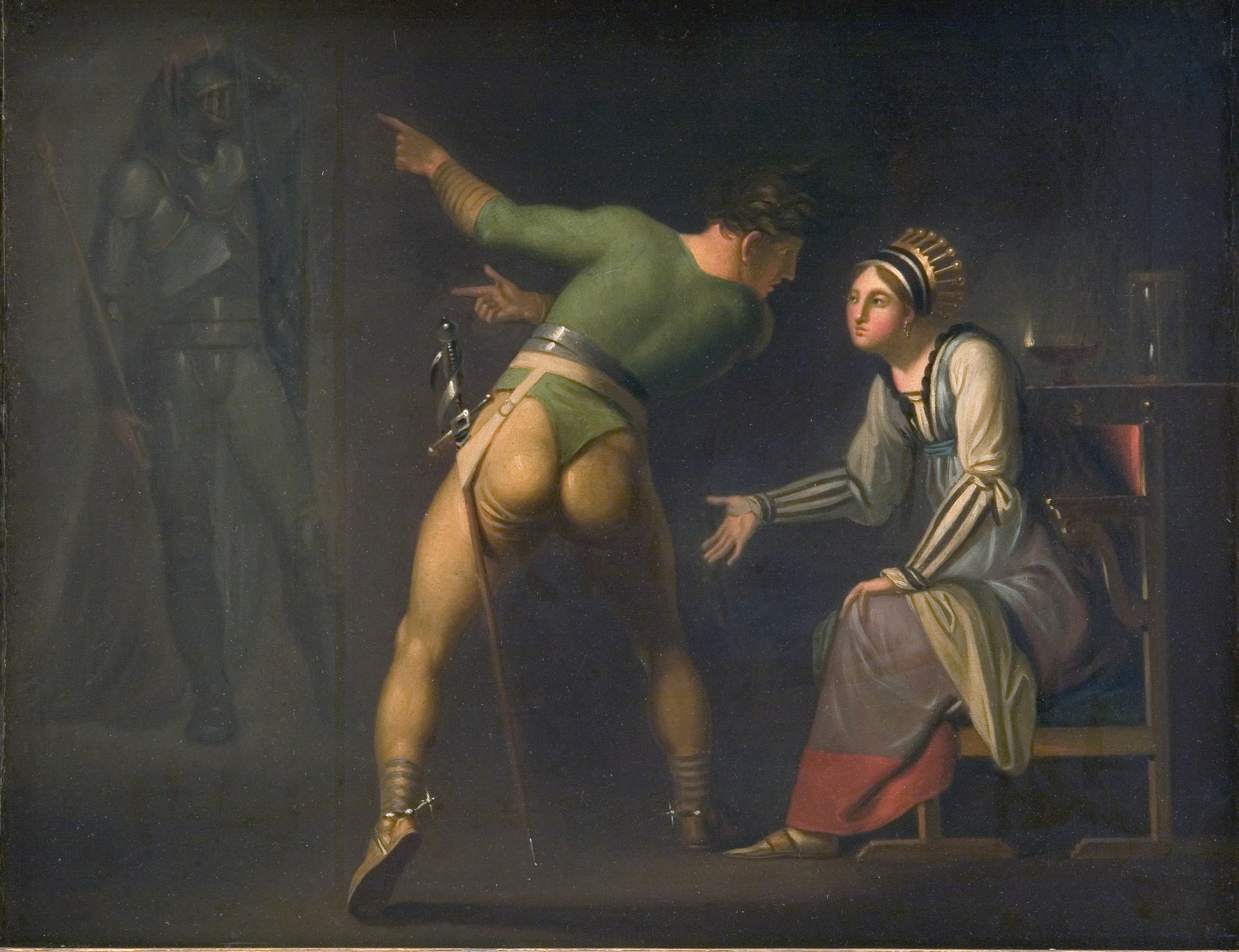
Hamlet hos sin moder, Nicolai Abildgaard, c.1778

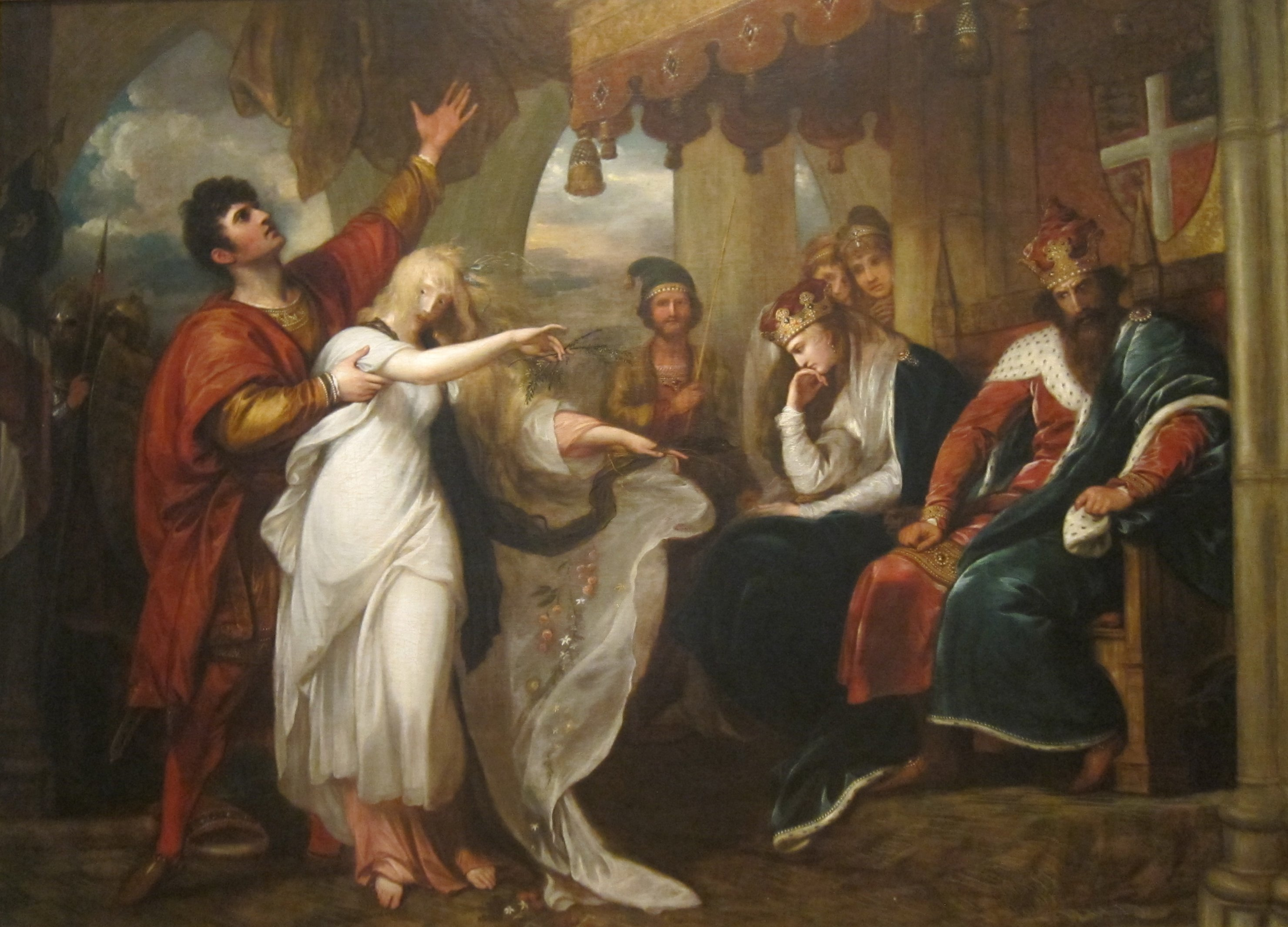
Hamlet: Act IV, Scene V (Ophelia Before the King and Queen), Benjamin West, 1792

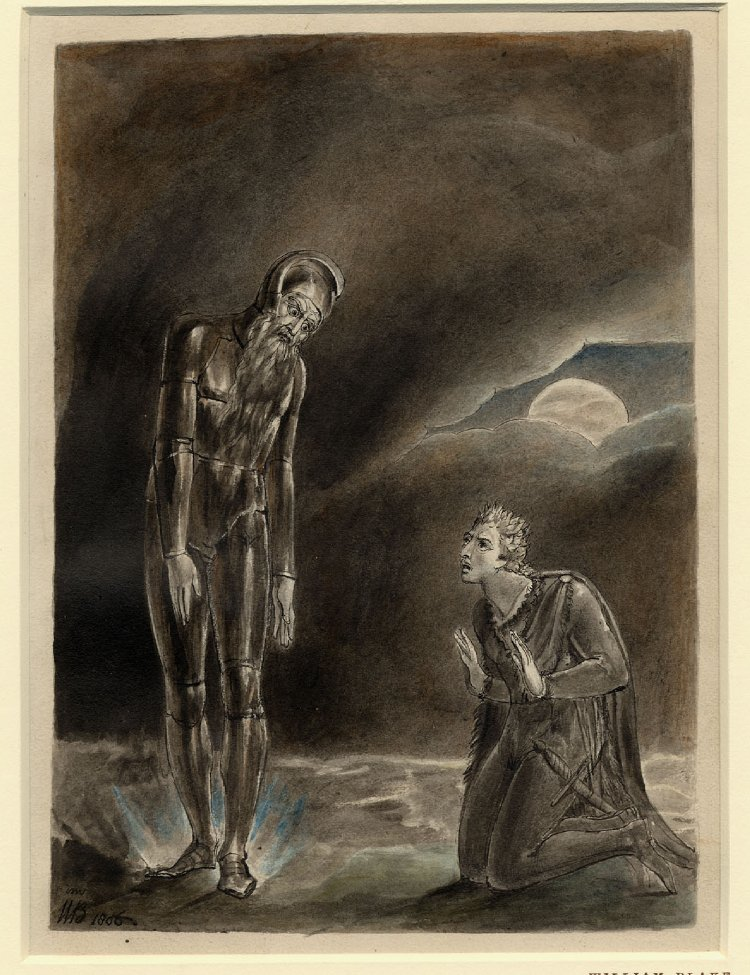
Hamlet and his Father's Ghost, William Blake, 1806

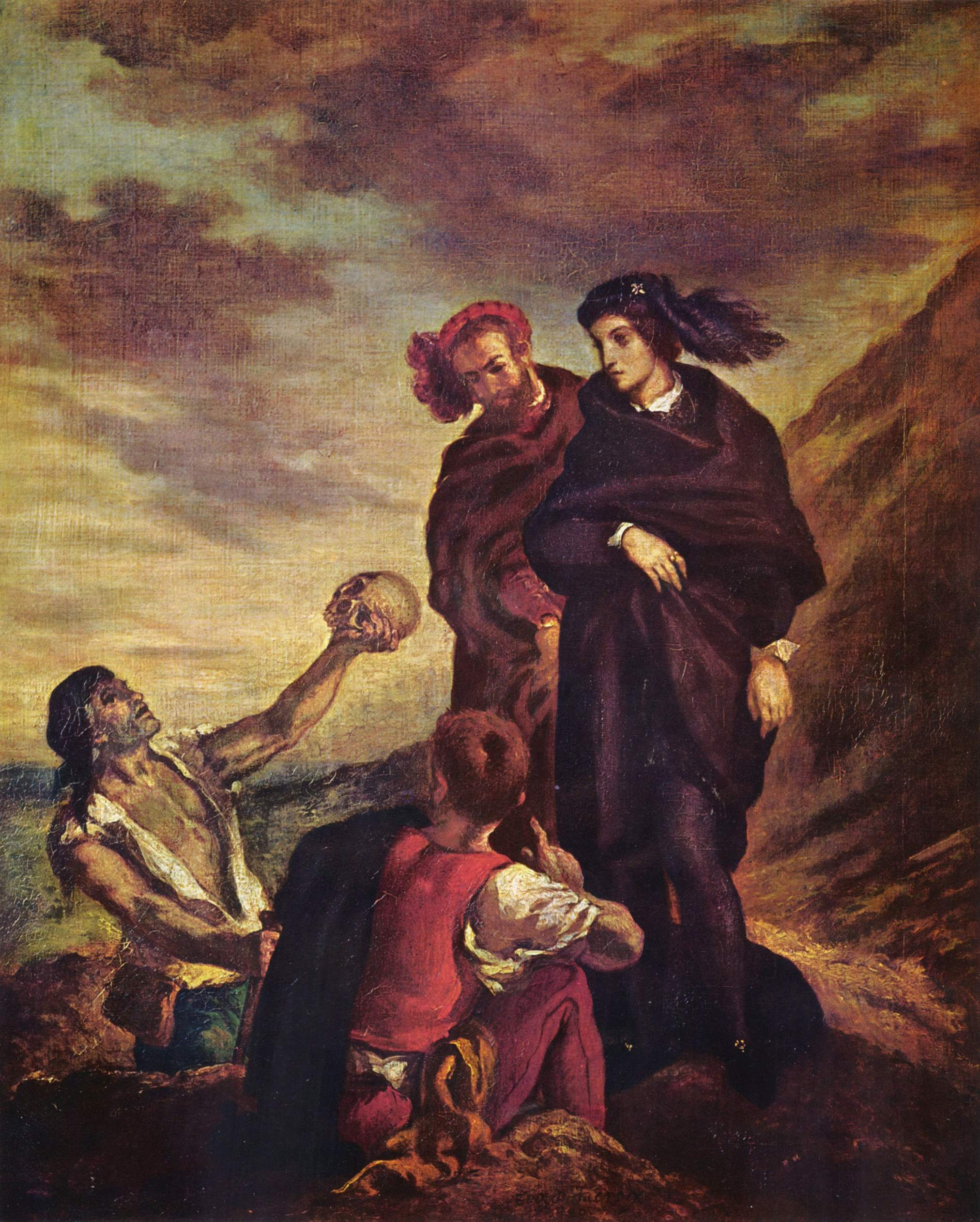
Hamlet and Horatio in the Graveyard, Eugène Delacroix, 1839

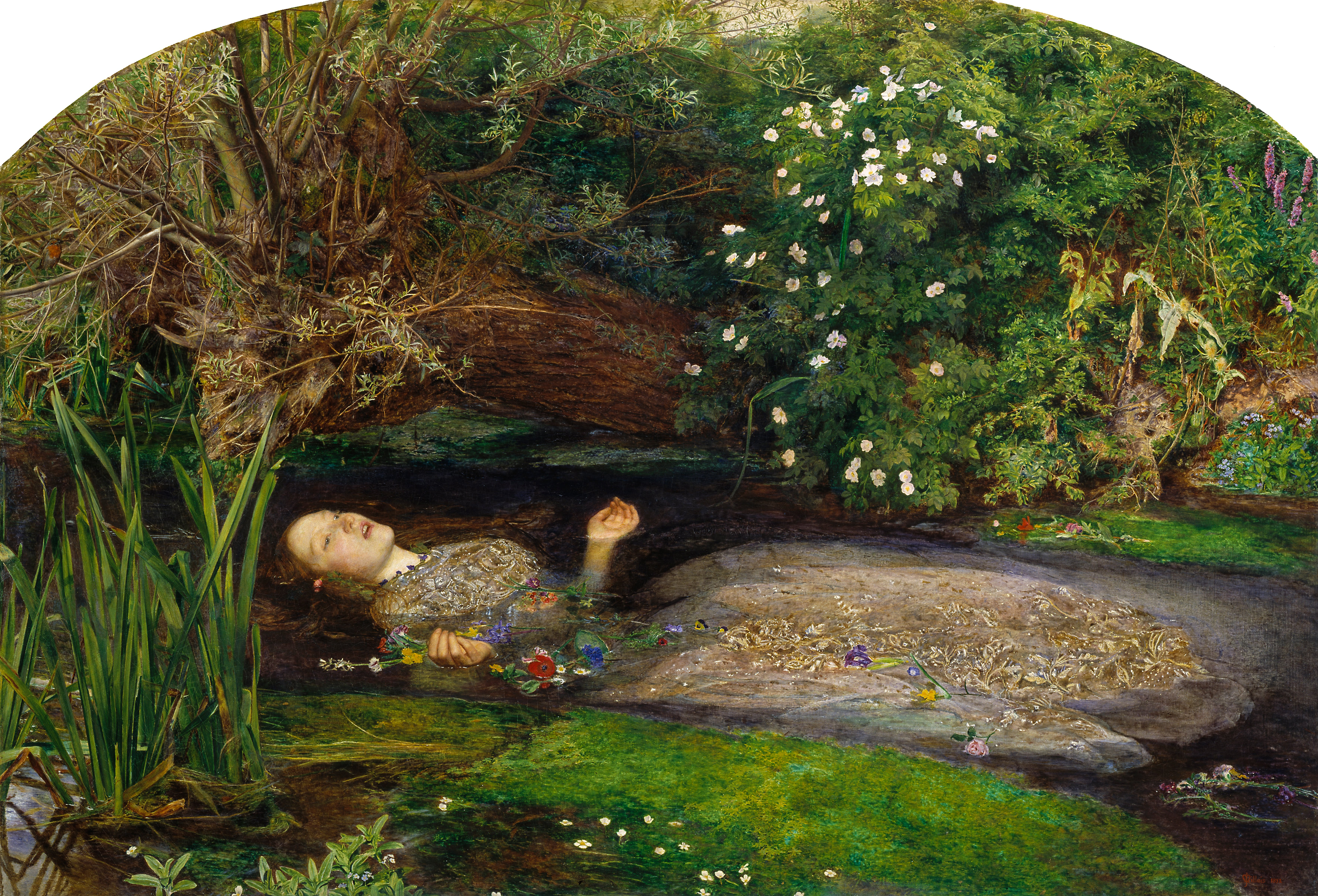
Ophelia, John Everett Millais, c.1851

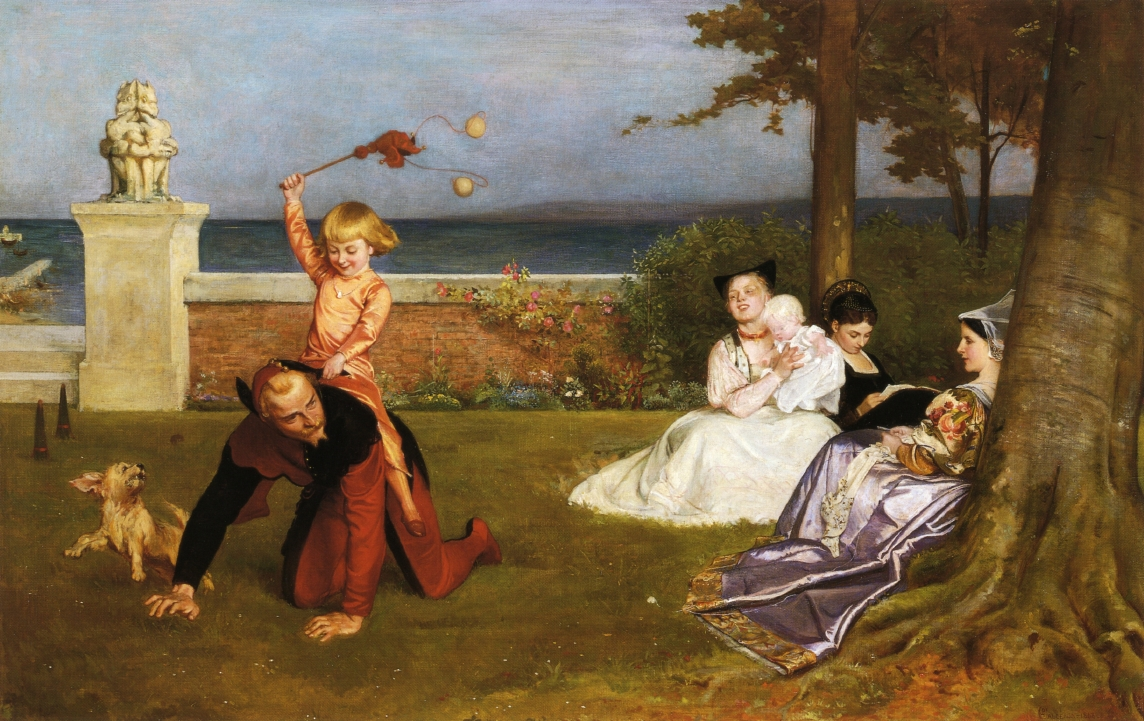
The Young Lord Hamlet, Philip Hermogenes Calderon, 1868

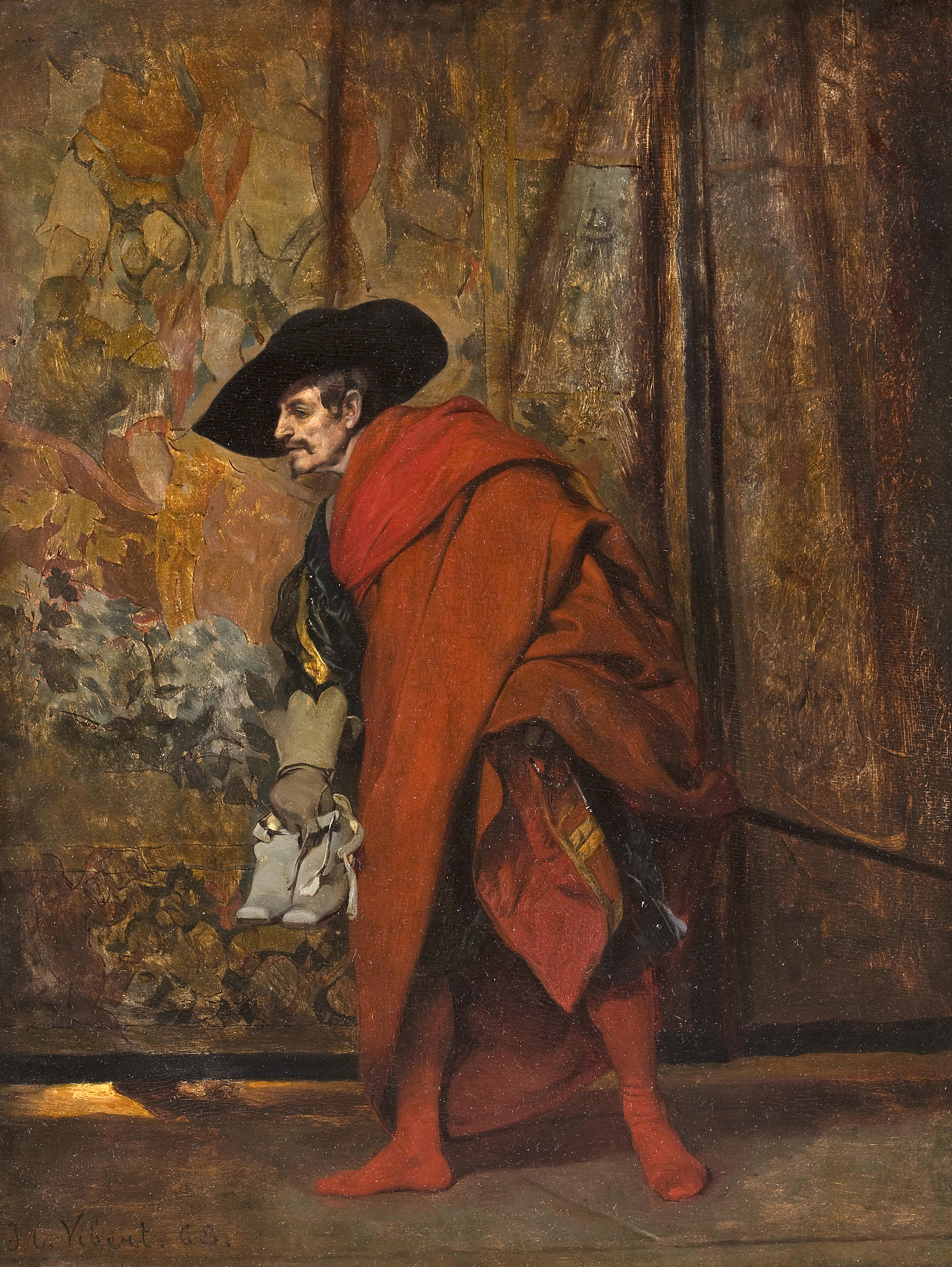
Polonius behind the curtain, Jehan Georges Vibert, 1868

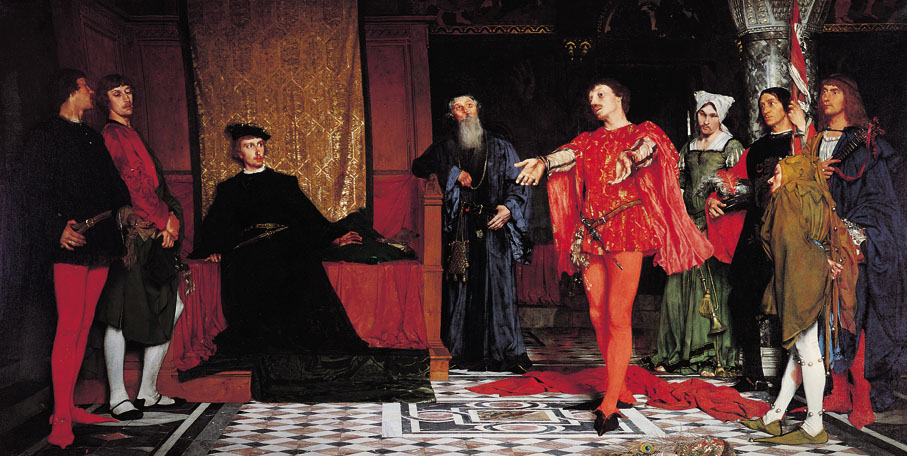
Actors before Hamlet, Władysław Czachórski, c.1870

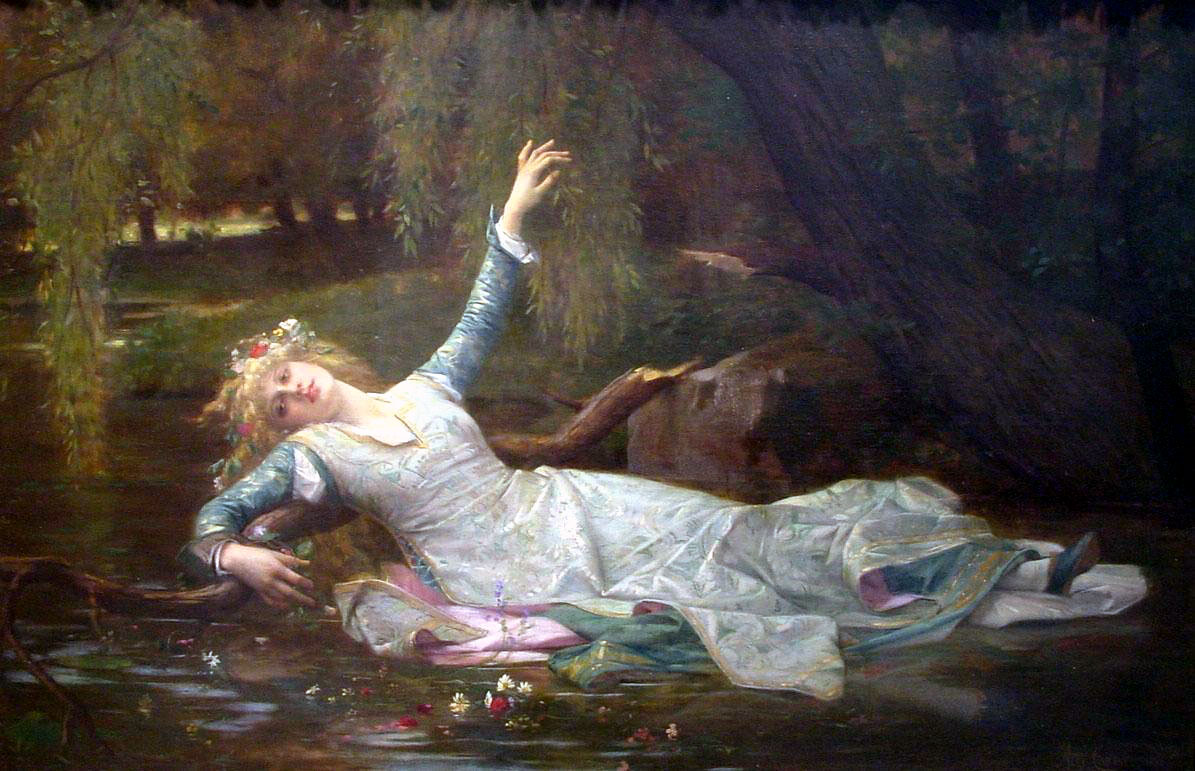
Ophelia, Alexandre Cabanel, 1883

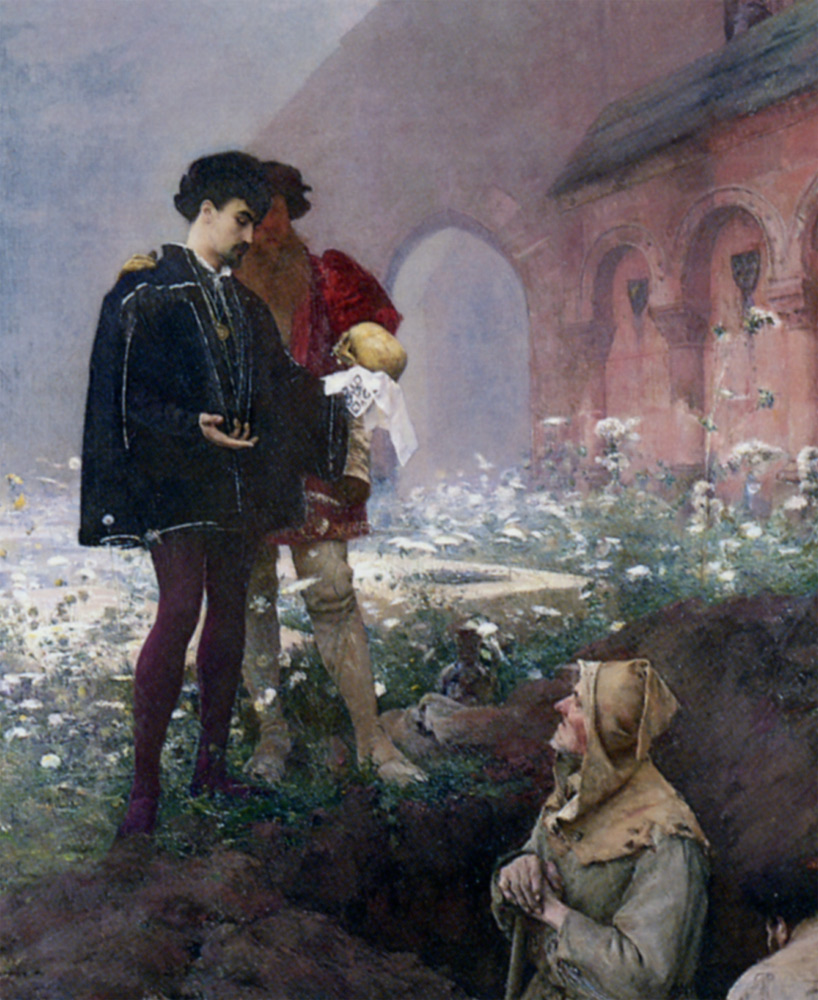
Hamlet and the Gravediggers, Pascal Dagnan-Bouveret, 1883

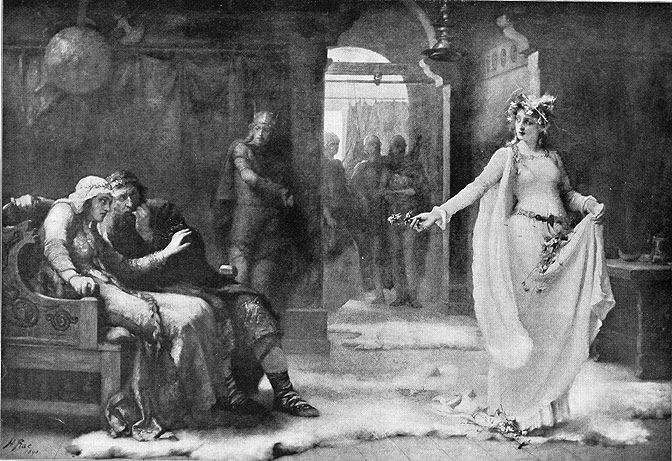
Ophelia, Henrietta Rae, 1890

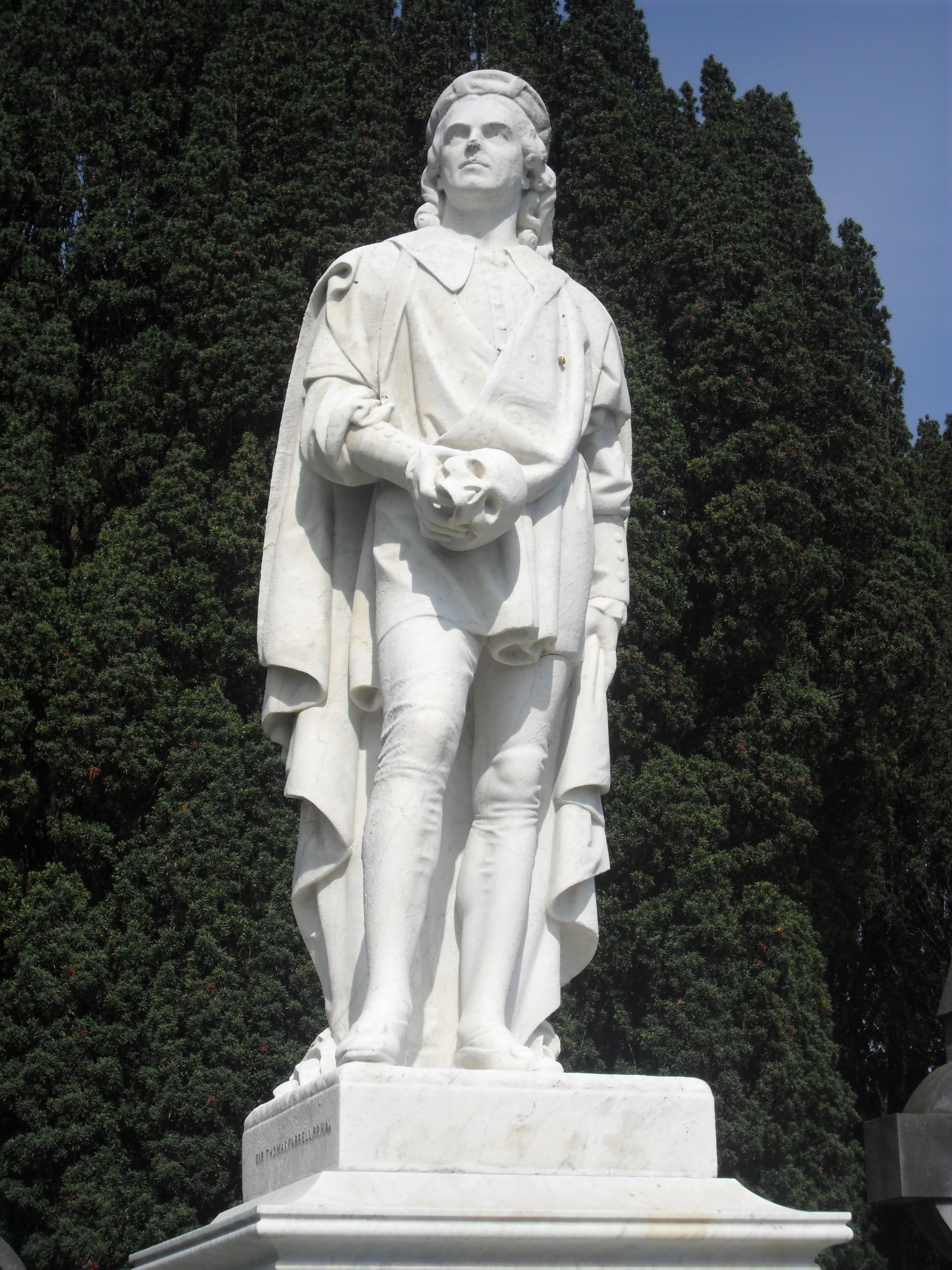
Barry Sullivan (1821–1891) as Hamlet, funeral monument by Thomas Farrell

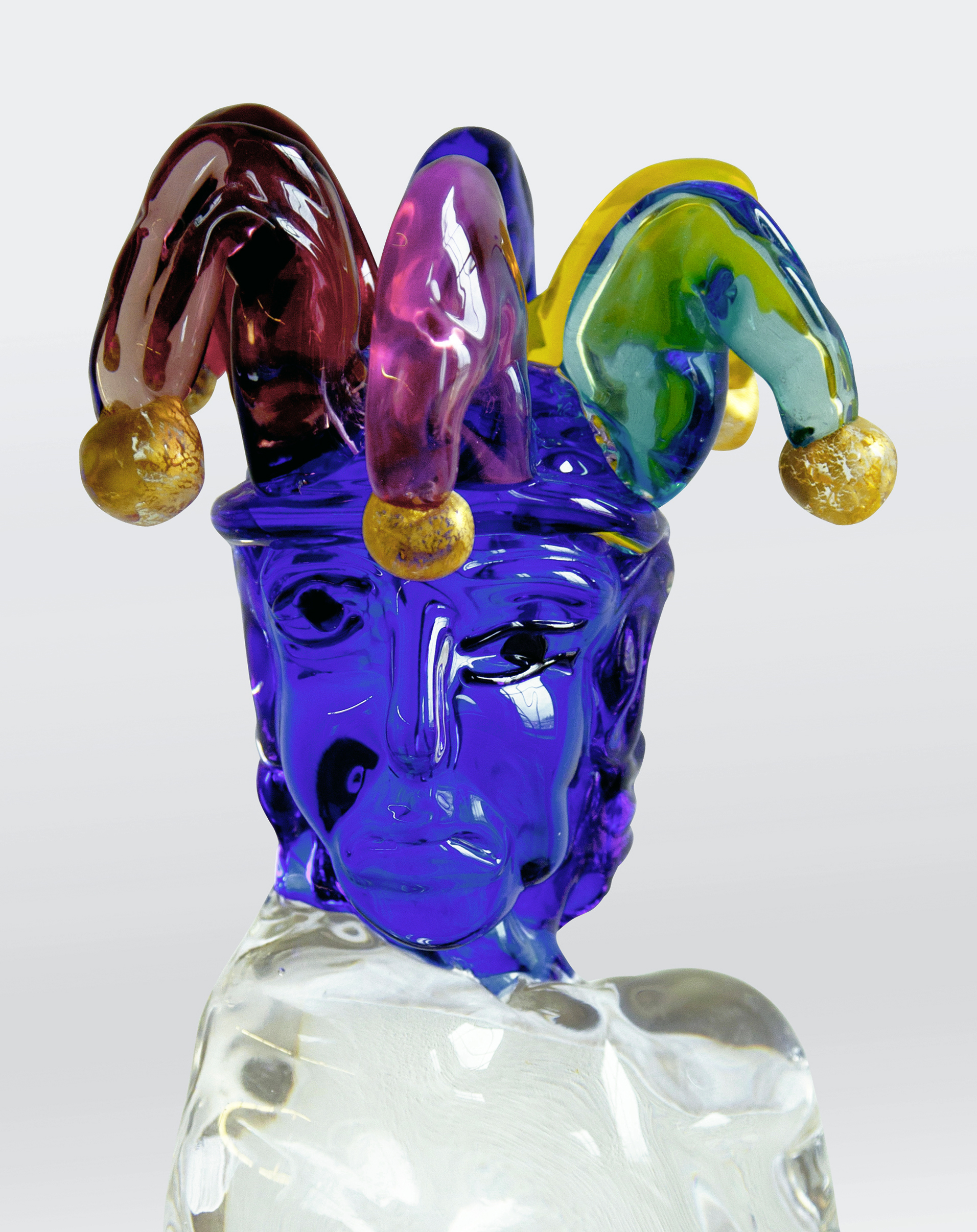
Hamlet the Prince of Denmark, Adi Holzer, 2010
