= The Humans =

The Humans may refer to:

- The Humans (comic), a comic published as a spiritual successor to the Planet of the Apes series
- The Humans (video game), a 1992 puzzle platforming video game
- The Humans (2015 play), a Tony Award-winning Broadway play
  - The Humans (film), an American film adaptation of the play
- The Humans (2027 play), a West End play
- The Humans (British band), a British rock band founded in 2007
- The Humans (New York band), an American 1960s garage rock band
- The Humans (Romanian band), a Romanian pop rock band founded in 2017
- The Humans (novel), a 2013 novel by Matt Haig
- Humans (American band), a US new wave band founded in 1979

== See also ==
- Human (disambiguation)
