= The Midnight Train =

2026 fantasy novel by Matt Haig

- Author: Matt Haig
- Publisher: Canongate Books (UK); Viking Press (US)
- Publication date: 21 May 2026 (UK); 26 May 2026 (US)
- ISBN: 978-0-593-83337-7

The Midnight Train is a 2026 fantasy novel by English writer Matt Haig, published by Canongate Books and Viking Press. While providing a time travel adventure, the novel is a companion piece to his 2020 novel The Midnight Library.

The Midnight Train is Haig's ninth novel for adults, and is scheduled to be published in 25 territories.

== Plot ==
The Midnight Train follows Wilbur Budd, an 81-year-old bookshop owner on the brink of death. He boards a magical train that allows him to revisit the important events of his life including his honeymoon with wife, Maggie, in Venice.
