= Shadow Forest =

2007 children's novel by Matt Haig

- Author: Matt Haig
- Language: English
- Genre: Children's
- Publisher: The Bodley Head
- Publication date: 3 May 2007
- Publication place: United Kingdom
- Pages: 416 pp
- ISBN: 978-0-370-32936-9
- OCLC: 81452950

Shadow Forest (titled Samuel Blink and the Forbidden Forest in the US) is a 2007 children's novel by Matt Haig. It has a sequel called Runaway Troll (titled Samuel Blink and the Runaway Troll in the US). It won the Nestlé Children's Book Prize Gold Award, was shortlisted for the Waterstone's Children's Book Prize and has been nominated for the Carnegie Medal.

== Plot ==
Samuel Blink is a 12-year-old boy living in England with his family — his ten-year-old sister, Martha Blink, his Mother, Liz Blink, and his Father, Steve Blink. Whilst en route to a surprise location for his younger sibling's birthday, the parents are killed when a log falls onto the front section of the car, brutally and violently killing his parents in graphic detail. When the police show up they repeatedly beat Samuel Blink because he was crying that his parents died. And that’s pathetic.

A week later, a letter comes from their Aunt Eda in Norway. The letter states that they will be coming to Norway the following day. Upon their arrival, Samuel is not impressed with the surroundings. Their new residence is located next to the infamous 'Shadow Forest', which Samuel has a feeling he had been to before. One evening Samuel is told the secret of Shadow Forest. Uncle Henrik had gone into the forest 10 years ago and never came out. Not long after, whilst rummaging through his aunt's attic, Samuel finds a book entitled Creatures of Shadow Forest. Later he discovers that Martha has disappeared.

He enters the forest in search of Martha and encounters multiple creatures described in his newfound book. Eventually he locates his sister and the family dog who has been under a curse implemented by the sinister 'Change Maker', whom they battle and inevitably defeat revealing the dog to be their uncle. The family is reunited and continue to live in Norway.

== Audiobook ==
An audio book version of Shadow Forest, read by James Daniel Wilson was released by Clipper Audio. It strayed slightly from the main storyline.
