= How to Stop Time =

2017 novel by Matt Haig

- First edition (UK)
- Genre: fantasy fiction, romance, history
- Publisher: Canongate Books (UK)
- Publication place: UK
- Pages: 352
- ISBN: 9780525522898

How to Stop Time is a historical fantasy novel by English writer Matt Haig, published in July 2017.

== Plot ==
Tom Hazard has just moved back to London to take a job as a high school history teacher. He may look like an ordinary 41-year-old, but due to a rare condition, he has been alive for centuries. He was born in 1581 in France and has lived history alongside famous historical characters such as Shakespeare, Captain Cook, and F. Scott Fitzgerald.

Tom is constantly under the supervision of the Albatross Society, a secretive group which claims to protect people like him, and its leader, Hendrich. As the story unfolds, Tom has to decide whether to remain safely in the past, or to risk living in the present.

== Reception ==
How to Stop Time received starred reviews from Booklist and Publishers Weekly, as well as positive reviews from The Guardian, NPR, The Washington Post, and Kirkus Reviews. It was named a bestseller by The Los Angeles Times. The book also landed on IndieBound's Indie Next List February 2018 and Summer 2019.

NPR considered How to Stop Time "a meditation on the tick and tock of time and mortality." The Guardian reviewer said, "The energy and zip of this book are hard to resist."

The book received mixed or poor reviews from The New York Times, The Los Angeles Times, and PopMatters. Writing for The New York Times, English writer Clare Clark compared the book unfavourably to Matt Haig's previous book The Humans. According to Clark, while "The Humans was warmhearted, sharply observed and often laugh-out-loud funny, funny enough to forgive Haig’s alien his regrettable fondness for fortune-cookie philosophy,... [How to Stop Time left] the reader craving some of the sharp-edged black humor that made The Humans such a delight."

Los Angeles Times' reviewer Chelsea Leu wrote, "Hendrich is a physical manifestation of Tom’s fears of attachment and vulnerability, though he’s more comic book villain than sensitively rendered character."

== Adaptation ==
In early 2017, the film rights to the book were acquired by Benedict Cumberbatch's production company, SunnyMarch. In April 2023, it was announced that the Cumberbatch and SunnyMarch project would now be a 6-part TV series.
