= To be, or not to be =

Speech in Shakespeare's play Hamlet

Comparison of the "To be, or not to be" speech in the first three editions of Hamlet, showing the varying quality of the text in the Bad Quarto, the Good Quarto, and the First Folio.

"To be, or not to be" is a monologue given by Prince Hamlet in the so-called "nunnery scene" of William Shakespeare's play Hamlet (Act 3, Scene 1). The monologue is named for its incipit, itself among the most widely known and quoted lines in modern English literature, and has been referenced in many works of theatre, literature and music.

In the monologue, traditional critical interpretation posits that Hamlet contemplates death and suicide, weighing the pain and unfairness of life against the alternative, which might be worse. Another major interpretation is that the monologue is Hamlet expressing his fear that, by killing his uncle Claudius, he will be committing a grievous sin, the consequence of which will be eternal damnation of his soul. It is not clear that Hamlet is thinking of his own situation since the speech is entirely in an abstract, somewhat academic register that accords with Hamlet's status as a (recent) student at Wittenberg University. Furthermore, Hamlet is not alone as he speaks because Ophelia is on stage waiting for him to see her, and Claudius and Polonius have concealed themselves to hear him. Even so, Hamlet seems to consider himself alone and there is no definite indication that the others hear him before he addresses Ophelia, so the speech is almost universally regarded as a sincere soliloquy.

== Text ==
Volta Laboratory recording of the Hamlet monologue, 1885
A voice recording of the monologue from 1885

There are three main copies of Hamlet: the First Quarto, also known as the "Bad Quarto", published in 1603; the Second Quarto, or "Good Quarto" of 1604; and the version included in the First Folio, published in 1623. These texts are commonly abbreviated Q1, Q2 and F1.

Three additional early texts are known, John Smethwick's Q3, Q4, and Q5 (1611–37); these are regarded as reprints of Q2 with some alterations.

This version preserves most of the First Folio text with updated spelling, punctuation, and five common emendations introduced from the Second ("Good") Quarto (italicised).

To be, or not to be, that is the question:
Whether 'tis nobler in the mind to suffer
The slings and arrows of outrageous fortune,
Or to take arms against a sea of troubles,
And by opposing end them: to die, to sleep
No more; and by a sleep, to say we end
The heart-ache, and the thousand natural shocks
That Flesh is heir to? 'Tis a consummation
Devoutly to be wished. To die, to sleep,
To sleep, perchance to Dream; aye, there's the rub,
For in that sleep of death, what dreams may come,
When we have shuffled off this mortal coil,
Must give us pause. There's the respect
That makes Calamity of so long life:
For who would bear the Whips and Scorns of time,
The Oppressor's wrong, the proud man's contumely, [F: poore]
The pangs of despised Love, the law’s delay, [F: dispriz’d]
The insolence of office, and the spurns
That patient merit of th'unworthy takes,
When he himself might his Quietus make
With a bare Bodkin? Who would Fardels bear, [F: these Fardels]
To grunt and sweat under a weary life,
But that the dread of something after death,
The undiscovered country, from whose bourn
No traveller returns, puzzles the will,
And makes us rather bear those ills we have,
Than fly to others that we know not of?
Thus conscience does make cowards of us all,
And thus the native hue of Resolution
Is sicklied o'er, with the pale cast of Thought,
And enterprises of great pitch and moment, [F: pith]
With this regard their Currents turn awry, [F: away]
And lose the name of Action. Soft you now,
The fair Ophelia? Nymph, in thy Orisons
Be all my sins remember'd.

=== First Quarto (1603) ===
The First Quarto is a short early text of Hamlet. Though it was published in 1603, it was lost or not known until a copy was discovered in 1823. It contains a number of unique characteristics and oddities. When it was discovered, it was thought to be an earlier version than the Second Quarto, but is now considered by scholars to be derivative, or pirated and imperfectly remembered. In the version below, the spelling is updated, along with minor alterations of scansion, capitalisation and punctuation.

To be, or not to be, Ay there's the point,
To Die, to sleep, is that all? Aye all:
No, to sleep, to dream, aye marry there it goes,
For in that dream of death, when we awake,
And borne before an everlasting Judge,
From whence no passenger ever returned,
The undiscovered country, at whose sight
The happy smile, and the accursed damn'd.
But for this, the joyful hope of this,
Who'd bear the scorns and flattery of the world,
Scorned by the right rich, the rich cursed of the poor?
The widow being oppressed, the orphan wrong'd,
The taste of hunger, or a tyrants reign,
And thousand more calamities besides,
To grunt and sweat under this weary life,
When that he may his full Quietus make,
With a bare bodkin, who would this endure,
But for a hope of something after death?
Which puzzles the brain, and doth confound the sense,
Which makes us rather bear those evils we have,
Than fly to others that we know not of.
Aye that, O this conscience makes cowards of us all,
Lady in thy orizons, be all my sins remembered.

=== Second Quarto (1604) ===
The text of the Second Quarto (Q2) is considered the earliest version of the play. In Q2 the whole nunnery scene including "To be" takes place later in the play than in Q1 where it occurs directly after Claudius and Polonius have planned it. The inclusion of "Soft you now", suggests that Hamlet has not (or is feigning having not) seen Ophelia thus far during his speech.

To be, or not to be, that is the question,
Whether 'tis nobler in the mind to suffer
The slings and arrows of outragious fortune,
Or to take arms against a sea of troubles,
And by opposing, end them, to die to sleep
No more, and by a sleep, to say we end
The heart-ache, and the thousand natural shocks
That flesh is heir too; tis a consumation
Devoutly to be wish'd to die to sleep,
To sleep, perhance to dream, ay, there's the rub,
For in that sleep of death what dreams may come
When we haue shuffled off this mortal coil
Muſt giue vs pauſe, there's the reſpect
That makes calamitie of ſo long life:
For who would beare the whips and ſcorns of time,
Th'oppreſſors wrong, the proude mans contumly,
The pangs of deſpiz'd loue, the lawes delay,
The inſolence of office, and the ſpurnes
That patient merrit of the'vnworthy takes,
When he himſelfe might his quietas make
With a bare bodkin; who would fardels beare,
To grunt and ſweat vnder a wearie life,
But that the dread of ſomething after death,
The vndiſcouer'd country, from whose borne
No trauiler returnes, puzzels the will,
And makes vs rather beare thoſe ills we haue,
Then flie to others we know not of.
Thus conſcience dooes make cowards,
And thus the natiue hiew of reſolution
Is ſickled ore with the pale caſt of thought,
And enterpriſes of great pitch and moment,
With this regard theyr currents turne awry,
And loose the name of action. Soft you now,
The faire Ophelia, Nimph in thy orizons
Be all my ſinnes remembred.

=== First Folio (1623) ===
Mr. William Shakespeares Comedies, Histories, & Tragedies, published by Isaac Jaggard and Ed Blount in 1623 and better known as the "First Folio", includes an edition of Hamlet largely similar to the Second Quarto. The differences in "To be" are mostly typographic, with increased punctuation and capitalisation.

To be, or not to be, that is the Question:
Whether ’tis Nobler in the mind to suffer
The Slings and Arrows of outragious Fortune,
Or to take Armes against a Sea of troubles,
And by opposing end them: to dye, to sleep
No more; and by a sleep, to say we end
The Heart-ake, and the thouſand Naturall ſhockes
That Flesh is heyre too? 'Tis a consummation
Deuoutly to be wiſh'd. To dye to sleepe,
To sleep, perchance to Dream; I, there's the rub,
For in that sleep of death, what dreams may come,
When we haue ſhufflel’d off this mortall coile,
Muſt giue us pause. There's the respect
That makes Calamity of ſo long life:
For who would beare the Whips and Scornes of time,
The Oppreſſors wrong, the poore mans Contumely,
The pangs of diſpriz’d Loue, the Lawes delay,
The inſolence of Office, and the Spurnes
That patient merit of the unworthy takes,
When he himſelfe might his Quietus make
With a bare Bodkin? Who would theſe Fardles beare
To grunt and ſweat vnder a weary life,
But that the dread of ſomething after death,
The vndiſcouered Countrey, from whoſe Borne
No Traueller returnes, Puzels the will,
And makes vs rather beare those illes we haue,
Then flye to others that we know not of.
Thus Conſcience does make Cowards of vs all,
And thus the Natiue hew of Resolution
Is ſicklied o’re, with the pale caſt of Thought,
And enterprizes of great pith and moment,
With this regard their Currants turne away,
And looſe the name of Action. Soft you now,
The faire Ophelia? Nimph, in thy Orizons
Be all my ſinnes remembred.

== Cultural impact ==
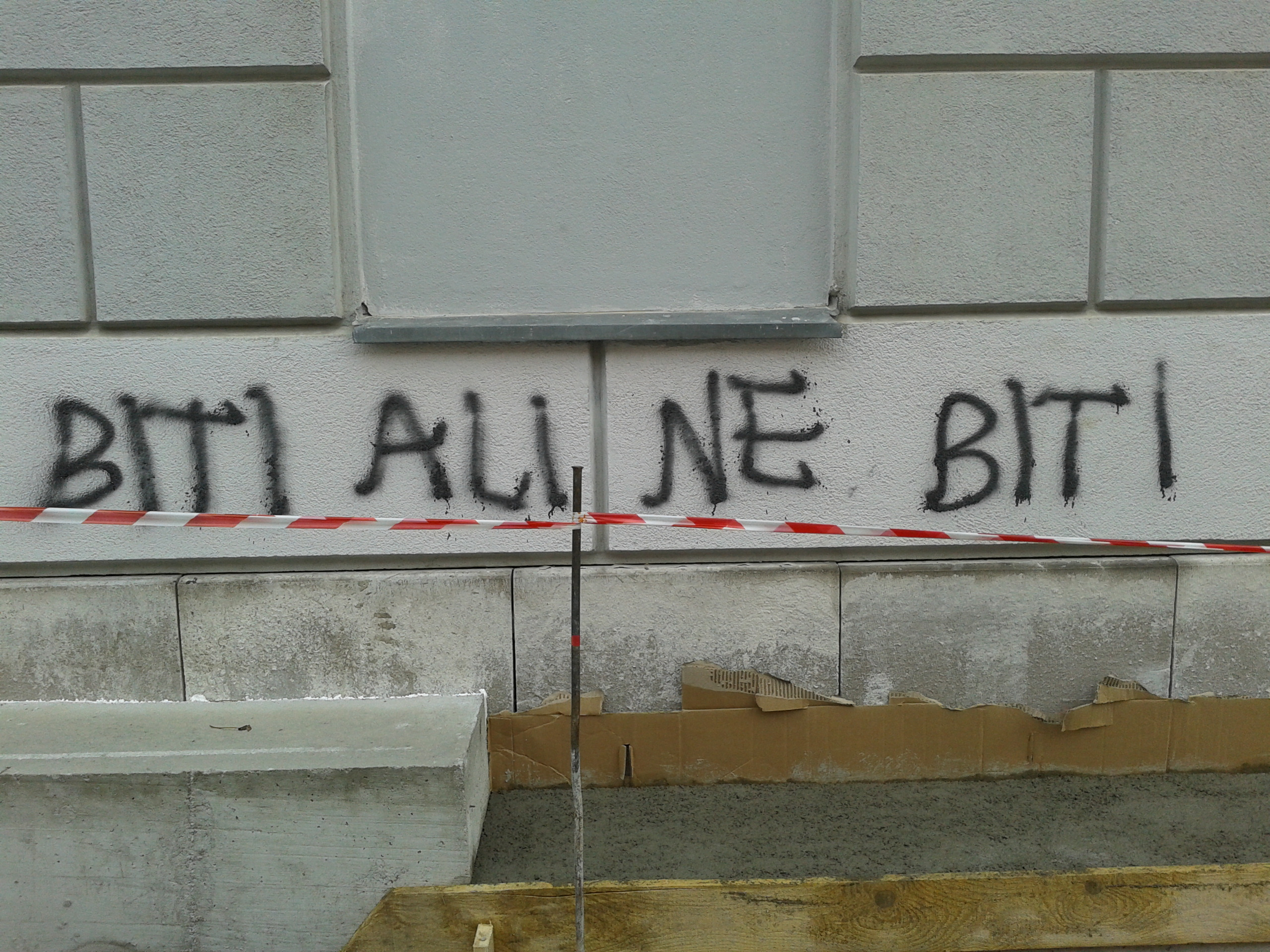
"To be, or not to be" in Slovene translation, Ljubljana

"To be, or not to be" is one of the most widely known and quoted lines in modern English, and the speech has been referenced in numerous works of theatre, literature and music. The two most iconic moments in the play―the Act III, scene 1 "To be or not to be" speech and the Act V, scene 1 image of Hamlet contemplating the skull of Yorick—may be linked when the play is remembered, but the two moments occur in different acts of the play.

A plot point of the 1942 film comedy To Be or Not to Be involves the first line of the monologue. In the 1957 comedy film A King in New York, Charlie Chaplin recites the monologue in the shoes of the ambiguous King Shahdov.

At the end of Three Hams on Rye Shemp quoted the phrase to be or not to be? That is the question. At which Moe reply Here's the answer and give him said answer; a cake in a face.

Hamlet's line is the basis of the title of Kurt Vonnegut's 1962 short story "2 B R 0 2 B" (the zero is pronounced "nought"). The narrative takes place in a dystopian future in which the United States government, through scientific advancement, has achieved a "cure" for both aging and overpopulation. The alphabetical/numerical reformulation of Shakespeare's lines serves in the story as the phone number for the Federal Bureau of Termination's assisted suicide request line.

In 1963 at a debate in Oxford, Black liberation leader Malcolm X quoted the first few lines of the speech to make a point about "extremism in defense of liberty."

Last Action Hero (1993) has Jack Slater (Arnold Schwarzenegger) parody the phrase in a mock trailer of an actionized version of Hamlet before blowing up a castle behind him just by smoking a cigar. His version has him say "To be, or not to be? Not to be."

Star Trek's sixth film, The Undiscovered Country (1991) was named for the line from this speech, albeit the Klingon interpretation in which the title refers to the future and not death. References are made to Shakespeare during the film including Klingon translations of his works and the use of the phrase "taH pagh, taHbe' ", roughly meaning "whether to continue, or not to continue [existence]."

What Dreams May Come, the 1978 novel by Richard Matheson and its 1998 film adaptation derive their name from a line from this speech.

The 1997 film adaptation of George of the Jungle also parodies this line; when George (Brendan Fraser) sees a paraglider dangling off the San Francisco–Oakland Bay Bridge and notices a rope on the bridge's ledge, he quotes to the audience "To swing, or not to swing"? After deciding "swing", George grabs the rope and swings, saving the paraglider.

The New Zealand television series Outrageous Fortune takes its title from the words of the third line of the speech.

A shorter Hindi version of "To be, or not to be" was recited by Shahid Kapoor in the 2014 Bollywood film Haider.

Stargate Atlantis, the Season 4 Episode 10 named "This Mortal Coil" (2008) after the speech, as well as Season 4 Episode 11 named "Be All My Sins Remember'd" (2008). These episodes involved learning about and fighting the artificial intelligence species Replicator.

The virtuoso soliloquy in Carl Michael Bellman's Fredman's Epistles, "Ack du min moder", was described by the poet and literary historian Oscar Levertin as "the to-be-or-not-to-be of Swedish literature".

In 2016, for the 400th Anniversary of the Shakespeare's death, the opening line was analysed, for humorous effect by a litany of Royal Shakespeare Company patrons and alumni.

The Japanese band P-Model's song "2D or Not 2D", off their self-titled album, directly references the line.
