= Reasons to Stay Alive =

Book by Matt Haig

- First edition
- Authors: Matt Haig
- Language: English
- Subject: Depression, anxiety disorder
- Genre: Memoir, Autobiography, Self-Help Book
- Publisher: Canongate Books
- Publication date: 5 March 2015
- Pages: 264
- ISBN: 9781782115083
- OCLC: 905941575

Reasons to Stay Alive is a memoir written by novelist Matt Haig, published on 5 March 2015. It is based on his experiences of living with depression and anxiety disorder, which he suffered from the age of 24. It is Matt Haig’s first nonfiction piece and the first time he wrote about his illness publicly.

The novel was reviewed by The Sunday Times, The Daily Telegraph, The Guardian, the Star Tribune, and the Toronto Star.

== Summary ==
One day, in September of 1999, Matt Haig felt that his old self had died. He was 24 at the time, and with little or no understanding of depression, or awareness of it. The impression of a dark cloud that poured endless rain over him made him feel 'caved in', with no way of escaping. He was scared because he did not know what was going on inside his mind.

After three days with no sleep and no food, he could no longer withstand the pain he was feeling. Everything he felt, everything he saw only made him more and more depressed. He felt that living brought too much pain, and the only way not to feel the pain was to end his life.

He got to the edge of a cliff, and was one step away from ending all his pain and suffering. Standing on the edge of the cliff, he thought of all the people who loved him, and he thought of death. He tried to gather up the courage to end everything once and for all, but he was too afraid, thinking that if he survived he might remain paralyzed, trapped in his body forever. He figured that to survive such tragedy would only bring more suffering; and so those thoughts restrained him from him ending his life.

From that point on, even though he was still very ill, in a very small part of him he found the strength to try and fight the illness, and not let himself be consumed by it. After the near-suicide episode he spent the next three years battling his depression.

Matt then goes on to narrate how he learned to examine himself, how he accepted and 'befriended' his depression, in which instead of him being part of his depression, depression was a part of him, and he had control over it. He recounts how through reading and learning about depression from others who have suffered from it, by writing, and the encouragement from his family and his girlfriend Andrea, he was able to conquer the illness. Eventually, he learned to appreciate life and all the things we take for granted.

Reasons to Stay Alive intends for readers to never lose sight of faith and support. Matt encourages to enjoy the little joys and moments of happiness that life brings, and tells that there are still opportunities to remain alive. Matt Haig tries to convince readers that time can heal, that at the end of it all, there is light at the end of the tunnel, even if can’t be seen.

== Breakdown ==
=== Chapter 1: Falling ===
It recounts Matt's first mental breakdown when he was just 24 years old, living in Spain with his girlfriend Andrea. He expresses that then, he felt he was going to die and did not see any hopes to keep on living. It emphasizes that a key symptom of depression is to not see any hope nor future; it made Matt feel trapped in a tunnel without any way of escaping.

Matt talks about how depression is invisible and mysterious, and even himself was not aware of his condition, even though the history of depression in his family; where his mom suffered from it and his great grandmother ended up committing suicide due to depression. Matt did not kill himself when he got his first and most brutal episode, but it did make him feel even worse by not doing it.

He states that only those who suffer become aware of depression, as for the outside people it remains unseen, making those who suffer from it, feel alone and that no one can understand them. He goes on to say that stigmas created by society affect thoughts which in-hand affects depression which is an illness that is fed by thoughts. And depression can affect anyone.

He explains that because depression and anxiety make you internalize everything, it makes you scared to be alienated, and tend not to speak about it, when in fact speaking, writing, and reading about it is helpful. And it was through reading and writing that Matt himself found salvation from depression.

He has a conversation across time with himself. His past self with no strength to keep on living, anxious of everything, hears his present self who assures him that if he fights there will be hope and salvation not too far away. But the old self is still in panic and is not convinced that he will overcome his situation, but his present self still consoles him and reaffirms to keep on going, and that he knows what the past self is feeling but it will all pass and everything will be okay.

After his episode, Andrea took Matt to the medical center, even though he was extremely afraid of going. A physician diagnoses Matt with depression and anxiety disorders and prescribes him with Diazepam. Matt expresses that he didn’t like the pills, instead, he was afraid to use them and when he used them, he did not feel that they worked, instead, he felt as he was slipping away from reality. He said that taking pills was just part of the problem.

He refused to take the pills, which lead him to experience his pain at a larger outcome but eventually got healed without the use of medication. He says that by not taking his med was how he started to learn about him and his illness. Matt realized that things like exercising, looking at the sunshine, sleep, and conversations made him feel better.

Shortly after his episode, he tries to get back on with his life. He starts to look for jobs and got one as an advertiser but ended up leaving the job. At this point, Matt says he felt like he was getting better, but yet he was still very ill. Matt refers to his depression as a cyclone where everything was very fast and it did not stop. But, as time passed, he started to be more aware of his symptoms. He said that depression was an illness that affected everything, both mind, and body. Matt goes on to say that depression is one of the deadliest diseases in the world and people do not realize how bad it is.

Matt emphasizes that suicide is the major leading cause of death under the age of 35. That there are approximately one million people that kill themselves, at least 10 million people try to take their lives, one out of five in people get depression at one point in their lives, and more are likely to suffer from mental illness. Also, he blames society’s social stigma to that Men are 3 times more likely to commit suicide than women, because men, traditionally, see mental illness as a sign of weakness and are reluctant to seek help.

=== Chapter 2: Landing ===
Matt starts by expressing that depression is like a bad storm, and once he went into the storm and came out, he was a changed person. He says that a side effect of depression is that you become obsessed with your brain and how it's functioning. And the more you research on depression the more you realize that depression is an illness characterized more by what we don’t know, than what we do know.

He restates the fact that medication did not help him, and instead he recurred to exercising, doing yoga and it was by that way, experimenting with his own body and mind, that he found what was the best solution for him. For him, it was important to take into consideration both his mind and body together.

Matt mentions that he kind of knew that something was wrong with him from a very early age. When he was about thirteen years old, he was always worrying about things he shouldn’t be worrying about but he quite didn’t understand himself and why he was that way.

Later, Matt reached a point in time where he would refer to his life as “Jenga Days”, one day he felt progress and the next he experienced regression. He would go for walks with Andrea and he would talk frequently with his family, but he remained anxious most of the time as he continued to struggle with depression.

Matt explained that the longer it took time to pass and the longer he felt he was “alive” it brought him pain, but aside from all his depressive thoughts, he knew that he had a chance to make it through. He started having hope again and was starting to be more aware of himself; he did not feel as numb as before.

=== Chapter 3: Rising ===
Matt describes the difference between his thoughts of his first panic attack versus his hundredth panic attack. In his first panic attack, Matt says he felt that he was going to die, that he was going to go crazy, that it wouldn’t end, that everything would get worse, that he was trapped, and he was the only person in the world who felt like that.

By his hundredth panic attack, he knew when it was coming, he knew that he had been there before, he knew that he was not going to die, that it was not the worst panic attack ever, and he continuously told himself that he would get over it. He went from panicking to knowing what was coming; he learned how to handle himself.

Matt talks about how walking by himself through depression was like. He was afraid of being left alone, but he kept reminding himself that it was going to be ok. He has another conversation in time in which his present self tells his past self that they made it, that they will get through depression, and that there is another life beyond that horrifying point. He tells his old self to not worry about worrying.

Matt goes and mentions his reason to stay alive. He says that there are people in the same place as him and others that have already been there, that things are not going to get worse, that nothing lasts forever, that life has a lot to offer and life is always worth it. And it is by these conditions that he was able to put himself together. Matt also says that love saved him, with the love of Andrea and her caring for him is how he survived with her being his biggest supporter.

Matt goes on to guide and recommend supporters on how to be there for people with depression. He says that you need to make them feel appreciated and needed, that you have to listen to them and that you need to be educated and be patient.

At this time Matt says that he started to be aware of his progress. There were times that he did not think of his depression at all and he was able to focus on his job, writing, and being able to publish his writing. It is here that he noticed that it was a sign of process.

Three years later, by 2002, he consistently kept feeling well. He found courage within himself and constantly put himself in uncomfortable situations that helped him grow stronger. It was at this point that he wrote his first novel.

Matt explains how running also made him feel better. He says that because many of the symptoms of running were similar to those of panic attacks, it made him clear his mind and made him feel stronger. He got to realize that depression is a long-life fight and that it is important to know that depression is smaller than you even when it feels vast; it operates within you and not you within it.

=== Chapter 4: Living ===
Matt’s point of view of the world and our society is that the world is designed to depress us because happiness is not good for the economy. If all the people in the world were to be content with what they had there wouldn’t be a monetary gain for big companies.

He talks about the warnings of depression, that he as a college student and when he was 24, was never aware of his constant worries and panics he had. He never noticed his symptoms. Matt speaks about anxiety and how it becomes the partner of depression. He explains how both can trigger each other and how they can coexist.

Because anxiety was taking a toll on everything in his life, he turned to yoga and meditation. He learned to accept and cope with things instead of fighting them. He learned to live in the moment, to live in the breath. And he learned that love was his anxiety's greatest killer.

He talks about how when dealing with depression things can get better and get worse. Once he understood this, he gives testimony that would he felt better by recognizing the things that made him feel better. He was finally able to recognize his illness and himself.

=== Chapter 5: Being ===
Matt wraps up his testimony by saying that he appreciates and thanks depression because he learned what is to feel nothingness and what is to appreciate life.

He accepted depression and feels that it was an important part of his life as it helped him found joy in life and appreciate things, he used to take for granted. He says that he hates depression and is still afraid of it, but at the end of the day, it made him who he is today.

He acknowledges he has got better and can now handle himself. He is grateful for being able to enjoy that life gave him a second chance.

== Characters ==
- Andrea: long-time girlfriend since college.
- Phoebe: younger sister living in Australia.
- Mary: Matt's mother; worked as a head teacher at an infant school.
- Andy and Dawn: neighbors of Matt and Andrea in Spain.
- Paul: old friend who used to be Matt's shoplifting partner when teenagers.

== Awards ==
- Waterstones Book of the Year Nominee (2015)
- The Sunday Times No.1 Best Seller
