= The Humans (novel) =

2013 novel by Matt Haig

- Genre: fantasy fiction, science fiction, psychological fiction
- Publisher: Simon & Schuster (UK)
- Publication place: UK
- Pages: 256
- ISBN: 1476727910

The Humans published by Simon & Schuster in 2013, is English writer Matt Haig's fifth novel. It is written in the first-person narrative with observations from an alien on planet Earth. The narrator "a 43-year-old newborn on Planet Earth" originates from the planet Vonnadoria and has taken over the body of a mathematical genius, professor Andrew Martin of Cambridge University.

== Reception ==
Author Jeanette Winterson called the book “troubling, thrilling, puzzling, believable and impossible” whilst Joanne Harris said it was "hilarious novel puts our species on the spot". Literary scholar Sara Martín argues that in The Humans, the alien narrator who takes over the body of the workaholic Cambridge mathematician Andrew Martin learns to be a caring family man, and that the novel endorses caring masculinity over selfish workaholism.

== Stage adaptation ==
A stage adaptation of the novel by Jack Thorne will run at the Theatre Royal Haymarket in London's West End running from 30 October 2027 until 28 January 2028. It will be directed by Jeremy Herrin and will star Matt Smith as Andrew Martin.
