= The Midnight Library =

2020 novel by Matt Haig

- Author: Matt Haig
- Language: English
- Published: 2020
- Pages: 288
- ISBN: 9780525559474
- Dewey Decimal: 823.92
- LC Class: PR6108.A39 M53 2020

The Midnight Library is a 2020 speculative novel by Matt Haig about a woman named Nora Seed, who after reaching a breaking point in her life, finds herself in a mystical library that allows her to explore the infinite versions of her life and discover what truly makes it worth living. It was generally well received by critics.

== Plot ==
Nora Seed attempts suicide and wakes inside the Midnight Library, a liminal space between life and death where the clocks are frozen at midnight. The library is managed by a manifestation of Mrs. Elm, the school librarian who was kind to Nora as a child. Mrs. Elm explains that every book contains a different version of Nora's life, branching from choices she did or did not make. Nora can enter any life she wishes and, if she finds one that fulfills her, she may stay permanently. If she loses her will to live entirely, she dies.

Nora first confronts The Book of Regrets, a heavy tome cataloguing every decision she laments. She begins sampling alternate lives. Entering a reality where she stayed with her ex-fiancé Dan, she discovers he has cheated on her and she has buried her own ambitions running a pub. She tries a life where her cat is alive but it is not as it seems. She travels to Australia to be with her friend Izzy but is faced with a tragic reality. She experiences international rock stardom as a singer-songwriter, a path she abandoned in her root life by leaving Joe's band, but she finds that version of herself is emotionally brittle and Joe died of an overdose in that world.

Nora explores several different lives, each shaped by choices she could have made. In one life, she becomes an Olympic swimming champion, fulfilling a dream she gave up as a teenager, but the pressure of perfection and the loss of her mother make the life difficult. In another, she is a glaciologist conducting important climate research in the Arctic, yet she struggles with loneliness despite meeting someone who is also traveling through different versions of life. Through these experiences, Nora learns that every life contains both happiness and hardship, and that no life is completely free from pain or loss.

A deeply seductive life places her as the wife of Ash, a kind surgeon she once stood up for coffee. They share a daughter, Molly, and a dog named Plato. Nora experiences genuine love and belonging, but she senses herself being pulled back to the library against her will. She understands that she did not build this life; she merely stepped into one crafted by another Nora's accumulated choices. It is beautiful, but it is not authentically hers.

She returns to a Midnight Library in ruins, shelves burning and ceiling collapsing. Mrs. Elm tells her the destruction means Nora has made a decisive choice: she wants to live. Mrs. Elm leads her to the one book not on fire, the volume containing Nora's root life, and its pages are completely blank. She hands Nora a fountain pen. As the library disintegrates, Nora writes "I AM ALIVE." The library vanishes.

Nora regains consciousness in her own bed, severely ill from the overdose. She staggers to her neighbor Mr. Banerjee's house and collapses, then is hospitalized. She recovers and reconciles with Joe, who confesses his own hidden struggles with alcoholism and a painful breakup. Drawing on insight from her alternate lives, Nora encourages him to train as a sound engineer and to ask out a man named Ewan, a doctor Joe has noticed at the gym. She reconnects with her friend Izzy and learns her piano student Leo still wants lessons. She begins visiting the real Mrs. Elm, now elderly and living in a care home, and plays chess with her regularly.

Nora realizes the prison she resented was never the town of Bedford but her own perspective. She plants metaphorical forests inside her personal wasteland, no longer serving the dreams of others. She publishes an essay declaring that while people easily mourn unlived lives, a person need only be one person, because every individual is already infinite. The impossible happens through living, and she chooses to live a thousand times yes.

== Release and reception ==
The Midnight Library by Matt Haig was published in 2020 by Canongate Books in the UK and by Viking Press in the US, totalling 288 pages. In the same year, its first audiobook, read by Carey Mulligan, was released by Penguin Audio, running for about 8 hours and 45 minutes.

=== Commercial performance ===
The Midnight Library became a bestseller in The New York Times, The Boston Globe, and The Washington Post. In the United Kingdom, The Bookseller reported that the novel reached the top of the UK Official Top 50 based on Nielsen BookScan data. This marked Haig's first appearance at number one on the overall chart and his first Mass Market Fiction chart-topping position, following the hardcover edition's rise to number one on the Original Fiction chart in August 2020. The accomplishment also earned Canongate the top publisher accolade. By September 2023, UK sales of the novel had reached 733,221 copies, contributing to Haig's career total surpassing 2.9 million.

=== Critical response ===
The novel was generally well received by critics. Natasha Pulley of The Guardian offers a generally positive assessment of The Midnight Library, highlighting Matt Haig's accessible portrayal of depression and the novel's central conceit of a library containing the many lives Nora Seed could have lived, noting its streamlined structure and focus on psychological implications rather than scientific detail, though Pulley observes some reflections on life may feel overly simplistic. Similarly, Karen Joy Fowler of The New York Times praises the imaginative, comforting exploration of parallel lives and the well-timed pacing of Nora's journey, while cautioning that the philosophical conundrum of a "root" life remains largely unexamined, and framing the narrative as familiar, old-fashioned, and optimistic. Jason Sheehan from NPR echoes the view that Haig's approach is comforting but finds it overly simplified, arguing that the author tames complex multiverse implications into a gentle, therapeutic story that lacks surprises and emotional depth. Kirkus Reviews provides a mixed evaluation, appreciating the accessible fantastical logic and playful tone but noting that the predictable narrative and light treatment of suicide render the fantasy sweet yet somewhat forgettable. Nessa Ordukhani of Zyzzyva similarly praises the philosophical meditation on regret, free will, and human resilience, while acknowledging that the earnest, straightforward style may not satisfy readers seeking stylistic or emotional complexity. Publishers Weekly highlights Haig's imaginative conceit and agreeable narrative voice but cautions that the repetitive formula can feel taxing, rewarding patient readers despite the occasionally wearying structure. Mike Vidakovich of Post Independent gives a generally positive review of The Midnight Library, highlighting Nora Seed's journey through alternate lives and her eventual appreciation of her own. Vidakovich emphasizes the book's themes of regret, personal growth, and the value of life, praising its emotional resonance. Library Journal underscores the novel's core exploration of regret and the elusiveness of a perfect life, emphasizing Nora's journey through infinite possible lives as both poignant and subtly subversive. Joyce McMillan of The Scotsman frames the novel as a highly stylised, fantastical depiction of depressive crisis, noting structural repetitiveness and familiar thematic content from Haig's non-fiction, yet concluding that Nora's ultimate epiphany and renewed appreciation for her life deliver an emotionally satisfying resolution. In addition, Good Morning America selected it as a Book Club Pick, while Booklist and BookPage awarded it starred reviews, and both The Book Reporter and The Arts Desk raved about the novel. Reviews from The Sunday Times and The Washington Post were also generally positive.

=== Accolades ===
Awards for The Midnight Library
Year	Award	Result	Ref.
2020	Goodreads Choice Award for Fiction	Won	
2020	Audie Award for Fiction	Nominated	
2021	Earphones Award	Won	
2021	British Book Award "Fiction book of the year"	Shortlisted	

The book was also included in "Best of" lists from The Christian Science Monitor, PureWow, She Reads, Lit Hub, St. Louis Public Radio, and The Washington Post.

== Adaptation ==
The Midnight Library was adapted for radio and broadcast in ten episodes on BBC Radio 4 in December 2020. A film adaptation is currently being planned by StudioCanal, with Garth Davis set to direct and Florence Pugh starring as Nora Seed; the book will be adapted by Laura Wade and Nick Payne. On May 29, 2026, Paramount Pictures announced that the project is in development and will be co-produced by StudioCanal and Blueprint Pictures.

In October 2026, Fred Fordham adapted The Midnight Library into an authorised graphic novel.

== See also ==
- Similar novels:
  - Life After Life
  - Before the Coffee Gets Cold
  - The Invisible Life of Addie LaRue
