= The Dead Fathers Club =

2006 novel by Matt Haig

- First edition
- Author: Matt Haig
- Language: English
- Publisher: Jonathan Cape
- Media type: Print (Hardback and e-book)

The Dead Fathers Club is a 2006 novel by Matt Haig. The book was published in the United Kingdom by Jonathan Cape and in the United States by Viking Press. The story is a retelling of William Shakespeare's Hamlet, and thus an example of intertextuality.

== Plot summary ==
The Dead Fathers Club follows the character of 11-year-old Phillip as he is visited by his father Brian's ghost. His father states that he was murdered by his brother Alan and that Phillip must avenge his murder and prevent Alan from taking over the family pub and marrying his widow. Phillip is given three months to avenge his father via the murder of his uncle Alan, lest his father fall prey to the Terrors (the supposed fate for ghosts of murder victims whose deaths are not avenged).

Phillip is encouraged by his deceased father to steal a mini-bus to supposedly prevent Alan from breaking into the pub and is shown several chemicals that could potentially kill his father's murderer. During this time Phillip is assigned to therapy sessions and begins a relationship with Leah, the daughter of a business partner in the garage Alan works at, which Brian does not approve of.

Phillip eventually tries to murder Alan using the chemicals, but he is forced to abandon his first two attempts. In the third attempt, which involves setting fire to his uncle's car garage, Phillip accidentally causes the death of Leah's father. Phillip's conscience eventually leads him to attempt to confess the arson to Leah, who is depressed and slightly delusional at this point. When attempting to confess, Phillip sees the ghost of Leah's father, who attempts to pressure Phillip and make him feel guilty for his acts. Phillip then attempts to confess to Leah's brother Dane, who pulls a knife on Phillip but does not hurt him and instead tells Phillip not to tell Leah about the arson.

Leah later goes missing and Phillip seeks the assistance of other ghosts to find her. Leah is discovered as she is preparing to jump off a bridge, the words "dead and gone" written on her arms in blood. Despite Phillip’s pleas, she jumps and Phillip jumps in after her in an attempt to rescue her. The pair are swept along the water, but are pulled out by Alan and one of his coworkers.

Phillip is taken to the hospital where he discovers a news article that suggests that his father's ghost was lying. Phillip's father is still visible and still attempts to persuade Phillip to murder Alan, who chooses not to listen to his father. Alan eventually dies due to injuries sustained from Phillip's rescue, but it is left unclear as to whether Brian's ghost was saved from the terrors or was simply a figment of Phillip’s imagination.

== Characters ==
- Phillip – The protagonist, Phillip, is assigned to the task of avenging his father’s murder by murdering his Uncle. He is an outsider at school and is picked on by Dominik Weekly and Jordan Harper.
- Brian Noble – Brian died before the novel starts. He comes back to visit Phillip to get him to avenge his death to save him from the terrors. He fades in and out of the real world.
- Alan Peter Noble – Alan, the antagonist, has supposedly killed his brother, Brian, by dismantling his brakes on his car. According to Brian’s ghost, he is only out to steal Phillip’s mother and take the pub for himself.
- Carol Suzzane Noble – Mother of Phillip, Carol marries Alan and is unaware of the presence of Brian’s ghost. Phillip cares a lot for his mother, who is one of his only last sources of comfort.
- Leah Fairview – The former girlfriend of Phillip is sister to Dane Fairview. Her mother died when Leah was young and her father is accidentally murdered by Phillip. At the end of the novel, Phillip saves her from committing suicide
- Mrs. Fell – The teacher and counselor of Phillip, Mrs. Fell is a lovely woman who offers comfort to Phillip. Ray Goodwin, is in the Dead Father’s Club; it is unclear whether or not Mrs. Fell knows this.
- Mr. Fairview – He is a father and a widower. He is murdered accidentally by Phillip.
- Dane – He is the brother of Leah and a friend of Phillip’s that at times has protected Phillip from Dominick. However he nearly slits Phillip’s throat when Phillip confesses that he murdered Dane’s father.
- Terry – He works with Uncle Alan in his garage. He chokes Phillip on Halloween night, he also revives Leah with Uncle Alan.
- Dominick Weekly and Jordan Harper – They are bullies at Phillip’s school hat torment and physically abuse Phillip.
- Nan – She is a minor character that is the mother of Phillip’s mother. She is disapproving of Carol’s precocious marriage to Alan.

== Reception ==
Critical reception for The Dead Fathers Club has been positive, with The Guardian praising the book as "sad fun". NPR and Booklist also praised the book, with NPR citing it as "a lovely and unsettling book". Entertainment Weekly gave The Dead Fathers Club a B rating, calling the book "clever" while stating that "the pastiche falls apart toward the end, when our once-likable hero gets mired in the nitty-gritty of revenge." The SF Site and She Knows praised the audio adaptation of the book, with SF Site writing that the book "lends itself well to an audio presentation". USA Today wrote that the book "has much to recommend it", citing Phillip's narration as a high point of the book. Kirkus Reviews also praised Phillip's narration.
