= The Humans (2027 play) =

2027 play by Jack Thorne

- Production poster
- Written by: Jack Thorne
- Based on: The Humans by Matt Haig

Premiere
- Place: Theatre Royal Haymarket, London
- Directed by: Jeremy Herrin
- Official website

The Humans is an upcoming play by Jack Thorne adapted from the 2013 novel of the same name by Matt Haig. It is expected to premiere at the Theatre Royal Haymarket in October 2027.

== Production ==
On 11 November 2026 it was announced that the play will have its world premiere at the Theatre Royal Haymarket in London's West End for a limited 13 week run from 30 October 2027 until 29 January 2028. It will be directed by Jeremy Herrin and will star Matt Smith as Andrew Martin.
