= Matt Haig =

English novelist and journalist (born 1975)

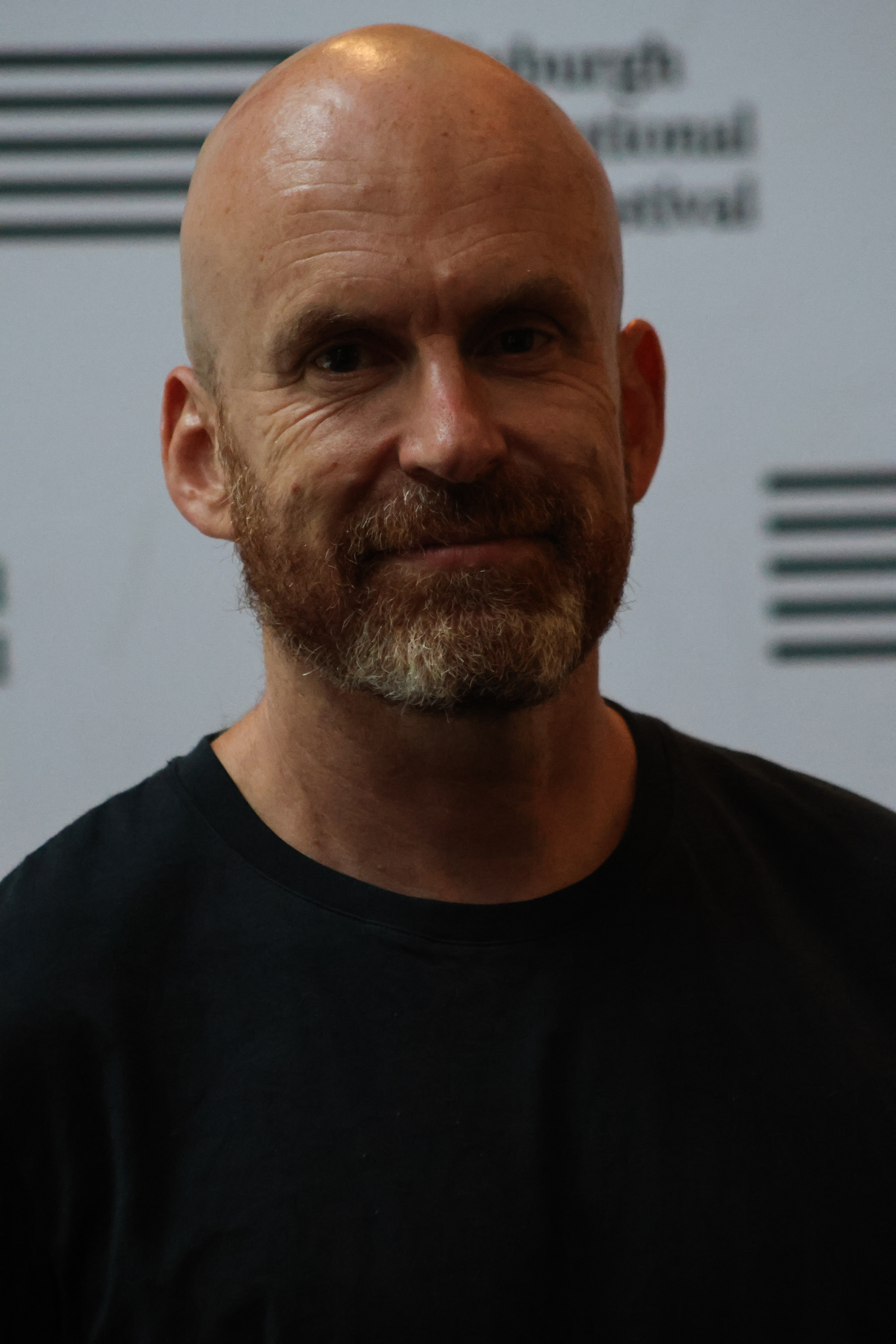
- Haig at the 2026 Edinburgh International Book Festival
- Born: 3 July 1975 (age 51); Sheffield, South Yorkshire, England
- Education: University of Hull
- Occupations: Author; journalist
- Spouse: Andrea Semple (m. 2013)
- Children: 2
- Writing career
- Years active: 2002–present
- Genre: Speculative fiction
- Website: matthaig.com

Matt Haig (born 3 July 1975) is an English author and journalist. He has written both fiction and non-fiction books for children and adults, often in the speculative fiction genre.

== Early life ==
Matt Haig was born on 3 July 1975 in Sheffield. His mother, Mary, worked as a primary school headteacher and his father, Richard, was an architect, who commuted to London for work. His paternal grandmother was Jewish and escaped from Austria after the Anschluss. Haig grew up with his younger (by three years) sister, Phoebe Rose, in the Nottinghamshire town of Newark. He attended Magdalene High School and Thomas Magnus Upper School in Newark. He has admitted to minor shoplifting during his teenage years and has suffered subsequent guilt from the petty crime, which included the theft of a tennis ball. He went on to study English and History at the University of Hull.

== Career ==
Haig is the author of both fiction and non-fiction for children and adults. His work of non-fiction, Reasons to Stay Alive, was a number-one Sunday Times bestseller and was in the UK top 10 for 46 weeks. His children's novel, A Boy Called Christmas, was adapted for film that was produced by StudioCanal and Blueprint Pictures.

His novels are often dark and quirky takes on family life. The Last Family in England retells Shakespeare's Henry IV, Part 1 with the protagonists as dogs. His second novel The Dead Fathers Club is based on Hamlet, telling the story of an introspective 11-year-old dealing with the recent death of his father and the subsequent appearance of his father's ghost. His third adult novel, The Possession of Mr Cave, deals with an obsessive father desperately trying to keep his teenage daughter safe. His children's novel, Shadow Forest, is a fantasy that begins with the horrific death of the protagonists' parents. It won the Nestlé Children's Book Prize in 2007. He followed it with the sequel, Runaway Troll, in 2008.

Haig's vampire novel The Radleys was published in 2011. In 2013, he published The Humans. It is the story of an alien who takes the identity of a university lecturer whose work in mathematics threatens the stability of the planet who must also cope with the home life which accompanies his task. In October 2027, the novel will be adapted into a stage play by Jack Thorne and will run at the Theatre Royal Haymarket in London's West End for a 13-week run.

In 2017, Haig published How to Stop Time, a novel about a man who appears to be 40 but has, in fact, lived for more than 400 years and has met Shakespeare, Captain Cook and F. Scott Fitzgerald. In an interview with The Guardian, Haig revealed the book has been optioned by StudioCanal films, and Benedict Cumberbatch had been "lined up to star" in the film adaptation. Reasons to Stay Alive won the Books Are My Bag Readers' Awards in 2016 and How to Stop Time was nominated in 2017. In August 2018, he wrote lyrics for English singer and songwriter Andy Burrows's music album, the title of which was derived from Haig's book Reasons to Stay Alive.

In 2020, Matt Haig released his novel The Midnight Library about a young woman who is unhappy with her choices in life. It was shortlisted for the 2021 British Book Awards "Fiction book of the year". The Midnight Library was adapted for radio and broadcast in ten episodes on BBC Radio 4 in December 2020.

In 2021, Haig appeared on Storybound, accompanied by an original score from Robert Wynia.

The Comfort Book was released on 1 July 2021. The Life Impossible was published in 2024 about Grace, a recent widow who unexpectedly inherits a house in Ibiza and after travelling there she discovers she has superpowers. She sets out to solve the mystery of her old acquaintance's death. A review described it as magic realism and a wise and moving novel. The Midnight Train, a spiritual followup to The Midnight Library, was released in May 2026.

== Personal life ==
Haig married Andrea Semple whom he knew since they were teenagers, and they live in Brighton, Sussex, with their two children and a dog.

Haig is an atheist. He has said that books are his faith, and the library is his church.

Some of Haig's work — especially part of the non-fiction books — is inspired by the mental breakdown he had when he was 24 years old. He still occasionally has anxiety. He has been diagnosed with attention deficit hyperactivity disorder (ADHD) and autism. He has spoken out in support of PIP (Personal Independence Payment).

Haig admitted in a 2026 episode of BBC Radio 4's Bookclub, despite setting his best selling novel The Midnight Library there, he has never visited the town of Bedford.

== Published works ==
=== Novels ===
- The Last Family in England (Jonathan Cape, 2004); US title, The Labrador Pact
- The Dead Fathers Club (Cape, 2006)
- The Possession of Mr Cave (The Bodley Head, 2008)
- The Radleys (Canongate Books, 2010)
- The Humans (Canongate Books, 2013)
- How to Stop Time (Canongate Books, 2017)
- The Midnight Library (Canongate Books, 2020)
- Tales of Connection (Van Ditmar 2021), a selection of stories from Notes on a Nervous Planet, The Comfort Book and Reasons to Stay Alive.
- The Life Impossible (Canongate Books, 2024)
- The Midnight Train (Canongate Books, 2026)

=== Children's books ===
- Shadow Forest (2007); US title, Samuel Blink and the Forbidden Forest
- The Runaway Troll (Cape, 2008); US title, Samuel Blink and the Runaway Troll. LCCN 2008-702, ISBN 9780399247408
- To Be a Cat (Bodley Head, London, 2012), illustrated by Pete Williamson. LCCN 2015-298269, ISBN 9780370332062
  - To Be a Cat (Atheneum, New York, 2013), illustrated by Stacy Curtis. LCCN 2012-28520, ISBN 9781442454057
- Echo Boy (Bodley, 2014)
- A Boy Called Christmas (Canongate Books, 2015), illustrated by Chris Mould. LCCN 2015-43442, ISBN 9780399552656
- The Girl Who Saved Christmas (Canongate Books, 2016), illustrated by Chris Mould
- Father Christmas and Me (Canongate Books, 2017), illustrated by Chris Mould
- The Truth Pixie (Canongate Books, 2018), illustrated by Chris Mould
- Evie and the Animals (Canongate Books, 2019), illustrated by Emily Gravett. LCCN 2019-393166 ISBN 9781786894281
- The Truth Pixie Goes to School (Canongate Books, 2019), illustrated by Chris Mould. LCCN 2020-476813, ISBN 9781786898265
- Evie in the Jungle (Canongate Books, 2020), illustrated by Emily Gravett
- A Mouse Called Miika (Canongate Books, 2021), illustrated by Chris Mould

=== Non-fiction ===
- How Come You Don't Have An E-Strategy (Kogan Page, 2002)
- Brand Failures (Kogan Page, 2003)
- Brand Royalty (Kogan Page, 2004)
- Brand Success (Kogan Page, 2011)
- Reasons to Stay Alive (Canongate Books, 2015)
- Notes on a Nervous Planet (Canongate Books, 2018)
- The Comfort Book (Canongate Books, 2021)
