= Faraj =

Faraj is a name of Arabic origins, found in many locations including in Kuwait, Yemen, Egypt, Libya, United Arab Emirates, Azerbaijan, Iran, and others. The name derived from Arabic meaning "joy after sadness", and can also hold the meaning "to cure", "fortune", or "remedy". Historically the name was used to ward off evil spirits, such as in the case when a sibling or parent has died.

There are many variations on this name and its spelling due to language transfer issues between old Spanish, Modern Spanish, and Arabic. During the Middle Ages, the name Abu al-Faraj (Arabic: أبو الفرج, lit. 'Father of Faraj') was a title for many Arab and Jewish poets and scholars.

== Mononym or honorific ==
- Abu Said Faraj (1248–1320), a Nasrid prince of Granada, d. 1320
- an-Nasir Faraj (1386–1412), Burji Mamluk Sultan of Egypt, 1399–1405
- Faraj ben Salim, Sicilian-Jewish physician and translator

== Given name ==
- Faraj Abbo (1921–1984), Iraqi artist, theatre director, designer, author and educator
- Faraj Al-Ghashayan (born 2000), Saudi Arabian professional footballer
- Faraj Al-Mass (born 1961), Qatari footballer
- Faraj Garayev (born 1943), Azerbaijani composer, music instructor, professor
- Faraj Said Bin Ghanem (1937–2007), Yemeni politician
- Faraj Guliyev (born 1962), Azerbaijani politician
- Faraj Laheeb (born 1978), Kuwaiti footballer
- Farajollah Salahshoor (1952–2016), Iranian film director
- Faraj Sarkohi (born 1947), Iranian literary critic

== Middle name ==
- Baba Faraj Tabrizi (died 1172/73), Iranian Sufi shaykh ("master") of the 12th century
- Hamdi Faraj Fanoush, Libyan judge
- Mirza Faraj Rzayev (1847–1927), Azerbaijani musician, tar player
- Mohamed Faraj Al-Kaabi (born 1984), Qatari athlete

== Surname ==
- Ahmad Faraj (born 1966), Emirati swimmer
- Abdullah Faraj (born 1986), Emirati footballer
- Imad Faraj (born 1999), French footballer
- Jumah Faraj (born 1985), Qatari volleyball player
- Majed Faraj (born 1963), Palestinian intelligence officer and politician
- Mustafa Faraj (1935–1974), Kurdish military, member of the Peshmerga
- Omar Faraj (born 2002), Swedish professional footballer
- Salih Faraj, Iraqi basketball player
- Samy Faraj (born 2001), French professional footballer who plays as a midfielder)
- Saoud Faraj (born 1991), Emirati footballer

== Other uses ==
- Bab al-Faraj, name of a city gate in Aleppo, Syria
- Cham Faraj, village in Iran
- Dibsi Faraj, archaeological site in Syria
- Du'a al-Faraj, a prayer
- Faraj Alahi, village in Iran
- Faraj Beygi, village in Iran
- Gol Faraj, village in Iran

== See also ==
- Abu al-Faraj
- Farag
- Farrag
- Farage (surname)
