= Henry Box School =

The Henry Box School

Location
- Church Green; Witney, Oxfordshire, OX28 4AX; England; 51°46′52″N 1°29′08″W

Information
- Type: Academy
- Motto: Studio Floremus translated as "By study we flourish"
- Established: 1660; 366 years ago
- Founder: Henry Box
- Local authority: Oxfordshire
- Specialist: Languages, Science
- Department for Education URN: 138210 Tables
- Ofsted: Reports
- Headteacher: Wendy Hemmingsley
- Gender: Coeducational
- Age: 11 to 18
- Enrolment: 1351
- Houses: Redgrave, Nightingale, Churchill, Newton
- Colours: Yellow, blue, green, red
- Former name: Witney Grammar School
- Website: www.henrybox.oxon.sch.uk

The Henry Box School is a coeducational comprehensive secondary school with academy status located in Witney in Oxfordshire, England. The school has a catchment area of the town of Witney and many surrounding villages such as Ducklington and Aston. It has approximately 1400 students, aged 11–18. The Latin motto of the Henry Box School is Studio Floremus, which can be translated as 'By study we flourish'. In the school's most recent inspection (June 2013), Ofsted judged the school to be "good".

== History ==
=== Foundation ===
The site was purchased in 1660 by a grocer, Henry Box, who decided to endow a school in his hometown after becoming a successful businessman in London. The schoolhouse, which still survives, and is now a Grade II* listed building, was completed before his death in 1662. His wife, Mary Box, then completed the project using money left in his will. In honour of the school's foundation, Oriel College, Oxford, of which Henry Box was a student, and The Worshipful Company of Grocers, of which Henry Box was elected Master, continue to sponsor one member of the school's governing body each.

=== Grammar School 1660–1900 ===
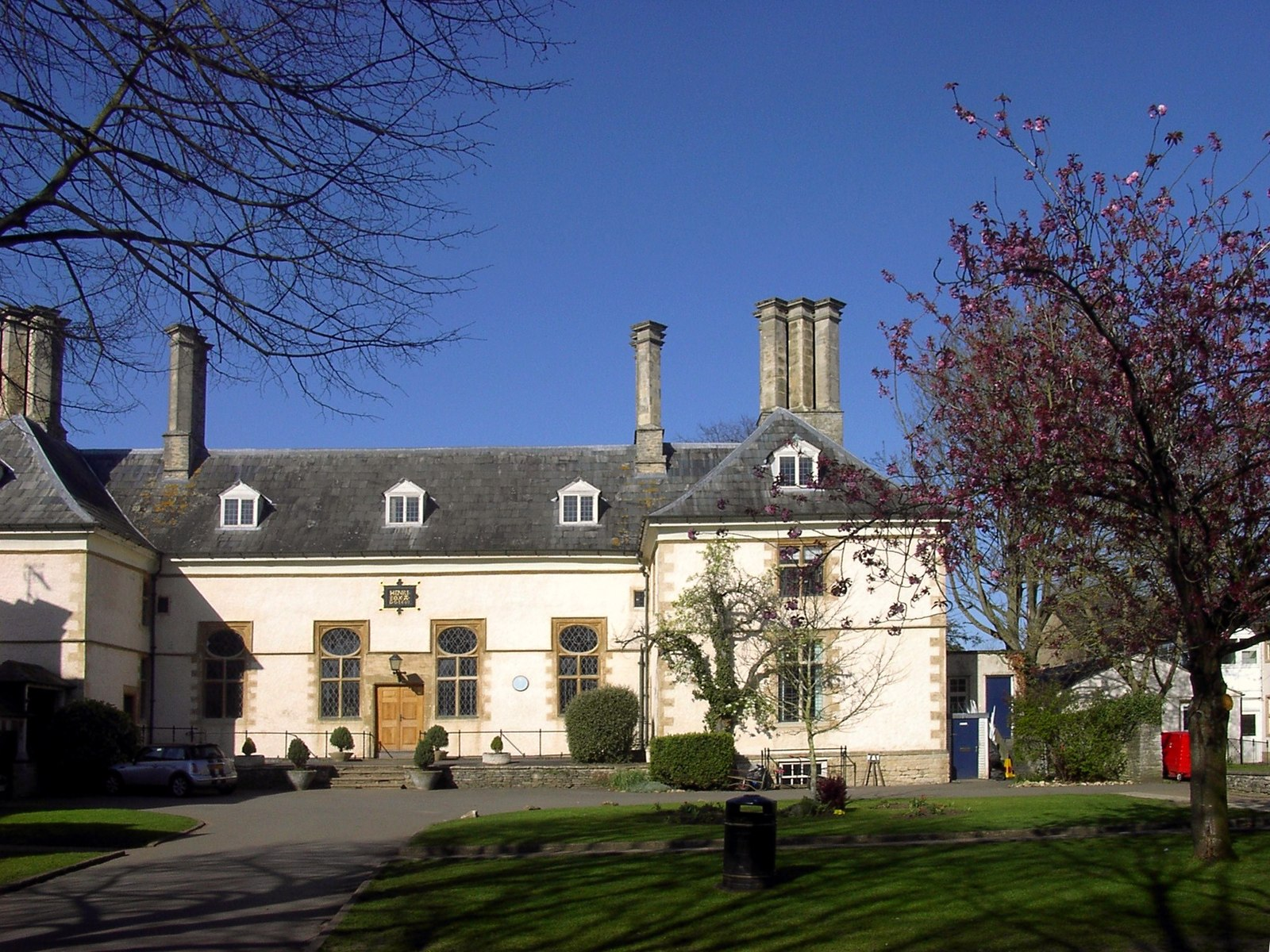
The original 1660 school building

In the 17th and 18th century, Witney Grammar School grounded the sons of merchants, manufacturers and minor gentry in classical curriculum, including Latin, Greek and Hebrew in preparation for entry to university. Students generally paid fees, but there were also thirty school places free of charge; preference was given to descendants of the Box family and the poor for these places. The staff included a Master, Writing Master and Usher. The school had boarding facilities, a school room and accommodation for the Master and Usher, all contained within the Box Building.

In the 1870s and 80s the school began to change its structure, becoming a "middle-class" or "second-grade" school to cater for boys without university aspirations. The staff included two resident assistant masters, a visiting drill master, and a resident female music teacher; subjects offered included English, French, Latin, arithmetic, natural science, drawing, singing, and bookkeeping. These subjects were intended to attract more children of professional tradesmen and farmers, therefore increasing the number of pupils at the school.

=== Grammar School 1900–1969 ===
In 1901 the local Holloway's Bluecoat School was closed and its pupils and endowments transferred to the Witney Grammar School. Girls were first admitted to the school in 1912 when there were 43 pupils in total. The school had a large playing field, cricket square, football pitch and tennis courts. In the early 1960s it had 350 boys and girls, and was known as The Witney Grammar School, Witney.

In 1960, the school celebrated its tercentenary and Queen Elizabeth the Queen Mother visited as part of the celebrations, opening new buildings and attending a garden party.

=== Comprehensive ===
It was converted to a state comprehensive school in 1968 after the tripartite system was abolished. It was and renamed after its founder Henry Box and the building took the name of Mary Box. By the 1990s it had around 1,000 pupils. The school was granted Specialist College status in September 2001 for Modern Foreign Languages and was the first school in Oxfordshire to gain a second specialism, that of Science and Maths, in 2006.

Nicola Edmondson was the school's first female head teacher, joining in 2007, although it was Mary Box who had laid down all the initial rules for the school, after Henry had died. She had shaped the school during the time of the first two headmasters.

The Henry Box School plays an annual football game against the Abingdon and Witney College in memory of former student Kevin Mott.

=== 350th anniversary celebrations ===
In 2010 the school celebrated its 350th anniversary. A book, entitled The Henry Box School — Its Place in History by Jane Cavell, was commissioned by the school and sold at Waterstones. Commemorative stained glass windows were also unveiled as part of the celebrations. The school also launched its house system, with the four houses named after notable figures from each century of the school's history.

=== Academy status ===
The school became an academy on 1 June 2012. It is now a part of the Mill Academy, a multi-academy trust along with Queen Emma's Primary School and Finstock C of E Primary School.

== Academic performance ==
In 2004 the school was one of 67 schools recognised nationwide by the DfES for its academic record through assessing value added statistics, improved performance and high grade pass rates.

In 2013, 64% of students achieved 5 good GCSEs or equivalent and 25% of students achieved the English Baccalaureate. 94% of students passed 5 GCSEs, and 26 students gained 8 or more A/A* grades. These were the school's best GCSE results to date. At A level, 25% of grades were A/A* and 16 students achieved 3 or more A/A* grades.

In 2014, Henry Box School achieved its highest ever GCSE results for a second successive year. 65% of students achieved 5 A*-C grades including English and maths. 18% of grades awarded were A* or A, and 27% of students achieved the English Baccalaureate. A level grades were also good, with 26% of grades at A*-A, and 53% A*-B.

In 2016, 65% of pupils achieved A*-C in English and Maths GCSEs. 27% of A level grades awarded were A*/A, and 14.4% of sixth form pupils achieved AAB or above including 2 facilitating subjects, below the national average of 17%.

== Curriculum ==
Subjects offered include: Art and Design, Biology, Business Studies, Chemistry, Childcare, Drama, Economics, English Language, English Literature, Food Technology, French, Geography, German, Graphics, History, ICT, Mathematics, Music, Physics, Psychology, Religious Studies, Resistant Materials, Sociology, Systems and Control and Textiles.

== Facilities ==
=== Sports ===
The Henry Box School has a sports hall and gym used for physical education lessons and after-school sports activities such as badminton, rounders, cricket and basketball. For some PE lessons students go off-site to use the Leys or Witney Artificial Turf Pitch. The school's extra-curricular sports teams include cricket, badminton, football, hockey, netball, rugby, and basketball, and the department organizes international sports tours such as the 2011 Sri Lanka and 2009 Portugal tours.

In addition to this, several students currently represent Great Britain and England in sports ranging from golf to equestrian to baseball.

The school's under-14 and under-16 boys' badminton teams won the Centre Parcs County Championships in 2013 and went on to represent Oxfordshire at the University of Surrey for the South East National Schools Championships, the first time a school has won both regional age group competitions.

In April 2014 the school won the Oxfordshire Under-16 Football Cup, after beating local rivals Wood Green in the final at Carterton Football Club.

=== Sciences ===
The Henry Box School has 11 science laboratories.

=== English ===
The school has a library, also known as the Learning Resources Centre. Students take part in the Kids' Lit Quiz annually and the school also hosts author visits such as Chris Bradford and Andy Briggs.

=== The Arts ===
The school puts on drama and musical productions throughout the year; for example, Jesus Christ Superstar in April 2013 and Annie in April 2011.

The school's new music block, including a recording studio and sound-proof practice and teaching rooms, was opened on 26 November 2010 by David Cameron, Prime Minister. To celebrate the opening of the music block, students recorded a cover of Take That's Greatest Day which was then uploaded onto YouTube. The members of 100 Bullets Back also met at this school.

== Sixth form ==
The Henry Box School has a sixth form, from which students go on to higher education including Oxford and Cambridge. The sixth form is part of the Witney Consortium, which allows students to study some subjects at Wood Green School or Abingdon and Witney College.

Admission to the sixth form is conditional on gaining an average of 42 GCSE points overall, including a C grade in English Language and B in the subjects to be studied at A Level.

Wider opportunities and activities in the sixth form include the Sixth Form Council, Prefects, Young Enterprise Scheme, Community Service and Leavers' Prom. The Sixth Form Variety Show is an annual event which is produced and performed entirely by students.

The Sixth Form Block includes a general common room, two quiet study rooms for private study, a kitchen and a fully networked computer room for exclusive sixth-form use. A silent study area in the school library is also reserved for sixth-form students only.

== Notable alumni ==
- Gugu Mbatha-Raw, actress (Doctor Who, Spooks, Bonekickers, Belle, Beauty and the Beast, San Junipero (Black Mirror)), Loki
- Lawson D'Ath, footballer (Reading Football Club)
- Jay Osgerby, founding member of BarberOsgerby industrial design studio and co-designer of the London 2012 Olympic Torch
- Duncan Macmillan, West End playwright
- Madeleine "Maddie" Moate TV Presenter, Actress, director and producer (best known for the Cbeebies series Maddie's Do You Know?)

=== Witney Grammar School ===
- Patrick Christopher Steptoe CBE, obstetrician and inventor, with Robert Edwards of in vitro fertilisation (IVF), and President from 1986 to 1988 of the British Fertility Society and from 1977 to 1988 of the International Federation of Fertility Societies
- Marina Lewycka, author (A Short History of Tractors in Ukrainian, Two Caravans, We Are All Made of Glue)
- Robert Llewellyn, actor (Red Dwarf, Scrapheap Challenge), briefly at the grammar school and expelled when 16 for arguing with the headmaster
- Diana Hardcastle, actress on TV, stage and film (That's Love, The Kennedys (miniseries), The Best Exotic Marigold Hotel)
- Natalie Ogle, actress on TV and film (We'll Meet Again, David Copperfield (1986 TV serial), The Stud (film))
