= Farrag =

Farrag (Arabic: فراج) is a surname. It is an Egyptian variant pronunciation of the traditional Arabic Farraj. It should not be confused with Faraj or Farag (Arabic: فرج).

Notable people with the surname include:

- Abdelmegid Moustafa Farrag, Egyptian academic
- Nadja Abd el Farrag, German television presenter and singer
- Ryan Farrag, English boxer
- Sherif Farrag, Egyptian-American fencer
- Wael Farrag, Egyptian football player

== See also ==
- Farag
- Farage (surname)
- Ein Farraj, a village located in Wadi al-Uyun Nahiyah in Masyaf District, Hama, Syria
