= Abu al-Faraj =

Abu al-Faraj is a title or given name, derived from the name Faraj, of Arabic origins. During the Middle Ages, the name Abu al-Faraj (Arabic: أبو الفرج, lit. 'Father of Faraj') was a title for many Arab and Jewish poets and scholars.

Notable people named Abu al-Faraj include:

- Abu al-Faraj al-Isfahani (897–967), Arab historian and author of Kitāb al-Aghānī
- ibn al-Tayyib (d. 1043), or Abulpharagius Abdalla Benattibus, Eastern Christian Arab physician and philosopher known for commentary on Galen and Aristotle
- Jeshua ben Judah, also known as Abu al-Faraj Harun Furqan ibn Asad, 11th century scholar, exegete and philosopher of Karaite Judaism
- Athanasius VI bar Khamoro (d. 1129), a Syriac Patriarch of Antioch
- ibn al-Jawzi (c.1126–1201), Muslim Arab scholar of the Hanbali school of jurisprudential thought
- Abu-al-Faraj Runi, 11th century Arab court poet who wrote masnavis
- Bar Hebraeus (1226–1286), also known as Abulpharagius, Jewish convert to the Syriac Orthodox Church
- ibn Rajab (1335–1393), Hanbali Arab Muslim scholar
- Abu Faraj al-Libbi, nom de guerre of a Libyan alleged to be a senior member of al-Qaeda
- Ahmad Salama Mabruk, called Abu Faraj al-Masri, a senior leader in the Syrian militant group al-Nusra Front
- Abu al-Faraj Harun (late 10th century – mid-11th century), better known as Aaron of Jerusalem, a Karaite scholar and grammarian

== See also ==
- Farag
- Faraj
