= Farage (surname) =

Farage is a surname, believed to be of French Huguenot origin, likely signifying forage. It has also been used as an anglicised form of the Arabic surname Faraj.

Notable people with the surname include:

- Anthony Farage, also spelt Faraj (1885–1963), Syrian Melkite Greek Catholic bishop
- Nigel Farage (born 1964), British politician and Leader of Reform UK since 2024.

== See also ==
- Faragism, an ideology and practice associated with the followers and supporters of Nigel Farage
- Farag (surname)
- Faraj, an Arabic given name
