= Wood Green School =

Location
- Woodstock Road; Witney, Oxfordshire, OX28 1DX; England; 51°47′33″N 1°28′16″W

Information
- Type: Academy
- Established: 1953
- Local authority: Oxfordshire
- Trust: Acer Trust
- Department for Education URN: 144008 Tables
- Ofsted: Reports
- Headteacher: Robert Shadbolt
- Gender: Coeducational
- Age: 11 to 18
- Enrolment: 1,331 (2024)
- Website: http://wgswitney.org.uk/

Wood Green School is a coeducational secondary school and sixth form located in Oxfordshire, England, which serves the traditional blanket making and historic town of Witney and its surrounding villages.

== History ==
The school was established in 1953 as Witney's secondary modern school before becoming a comprehensive school in 1968.

Previously a community school administered by Oxfordshire County Council, in February 2017 Wood Green School converted to academy status. The school is now sponsored by the Acer Trust.

== Facilities ==
Set in over thirty acres of grounds and playing fields, the school is equipped with an all-weather floodlit pitch, multi-purpose sports hall, gymnasium and fitness suite. All classrooms throughout the school are equipped with interactive whiteboards. In 2015 Wood Green School was inspected by Ofsted and judged to be Good.

== Academics ==
Wood Green School hosts approximately 1100 students, aged between 11–18, including the Sixth form.

The school is a specialist visual and performing Arts College with many extra curricular activities in drama

In 2015, 68% of GCSE candidates achieved 5 or more A*-C grades, and 54% of GCSE candidates achieved 5 or more A*-C grades including English and Mathematics. In 2015 at A Level, 80% of grades achieved were A*-C.

== Sixth form ==
The Sixth Form Centre is located in a modern building above the school restaurant, with a panoramic view over the school grounds mainly the field, the astro turf and N block. It includes a common room, seminar room, as well as a silent study workroom with networked computers and printing facilities. The Sixth form is part of the Witney Consortium, offering a wider range of course choices by allowing students to study some of their subjects at Henry Box School.

== Notable former pupils ==
- Emma Appleton - Actress and model
- Mark Lucraft - Barrister and Crown Court Judge
- Dan Tomlinson - Labour MP for Chipping Barnet
