= Farag =

Farag is a surname. It is a variant pronunciation of the traditional Arabic Faraj. Notable people with the surname include:

== Given name ==
- Farag Foda (1946–1992), Egyptian professor, writer, columnist, and human rights activist

== Surname ==
- Ahmed Hassan Farag (born 1982), Egyptian footballer
- Ahmed Samir Farag (born 1986), Egyptian footballer
- Alfred Farag (1929–2005), eminent Egyptian playwright of the post-1952 Revolution period
- Ali Farag, (born 1992), professional squash player who represents Egypt
- Andy Farag, the percussionist for rock band Umphrey's McGee
- Haiat Farag (born 1987), amateur Egyptian freestyle wrestler who played for the women's middleweight category
- Ibrahim Farag (born 1990), Egyptian freestyle wrestler
- Ismael Ali Farag al Bakush, Libyan detainee held in extrajudicial detention in the Guantanamo Bay detention camps in Cuba
- Mohamad Farag (born 1986), Midfielder or central midfielder or attacking midfielder
- Mohammed Abdul-Salam Farag (1954–1982), Egyptian radical Islamist and theorist
- Mohamed Farag Bashmilah, citizen of Yemen, reportedly a subject of the United States' extraordinary rendition program
- Nagaite Farag on The Apprentice (Irish TV series)
- Sami Farag (1935–2015), Egyptian lawyer, judge, prosecutor and vice-president of the Supreme Constitutional Court of Egypt
- Yasser Ibrahim Farag (born 1984), Egyptian athlete competing in the shot put and discus throw events

== See also ==
- Faragism, an ideology and practice associated with the followers and supporters of Nigel Farage
- Faraj
- Farrag
- Farage (surname)
- Rod El Farag, an administrative region forming about one third of Shobra in Cairo, Egypt
- Fag Rag
- Faragheh
- Faragher
