= Two Caravans =

2007 novel by Marina Lewycka

- Author: Marina Lewycka
- Language: English
- Genre: Novel
- Publisher: Penguin Books (Fig Tree in the UK)
- Publication date: 29 March 2007
- Publication place: England
- Media type: Print (Hardcover)
- ISBN: 0-670-91637-4
- OCLC: 74523455

Two Caravans is a novel by Marina Lewycka. It was published by Penguin Books on 29 March 2007 for the United Kingdom market. In the United States and Canada it is published under the title Strawberry Fields. The story focuses on characters who are migrant labourers of various backgrounds working in England's agricultural industry, in particular, portraying Eastern Europeans in the United Kingdom. The book follows Lewycka's debut novel A Short History of Tractors in Ukrainian, and was shortlisted for the Orwell Prize for political writing in 2008.

== Plot summary ==
A crew of migrant workers from three continents are forced to flee their English strawberry field for a journey across all of England in pursuit of their various dreams of a better future.

The story centres on a group of migrant workers who hail from Eastern Europe, China, Malaysia and Africa and have come to Kent to harvest strawberries for delivery to the supermarkets, and end up living in two small caravans, a men's caravan and a women's caravan. They are all seeking a better life (and in their different ways they are also, of course, looking for love) and they've come to England, some legally, some illegally, to find it.

They are supervised by Farmer Leapish, a red-faced man who treats everyone equally except for the Polish woman named Yola, the boss of the crew, who favours him with her charms in exchange for something a little extra on the side. But the two are discreet, and all is harmonious in this cozy vale – until the evening when Farmer Leapish's wife comes upon him and Yola and in retaliation she runs him down in her red sports car. By the time the police arrive the migrant workers (and a dog called Dog) have piled into one of the trailer homes and quickly leave their arcadia, thus setting off on a journey across the length and breadth of England.

== Stage adaptation ==
An operatic adaptation of Two Caravans, written by Ace McCarron and composed by Guy Harries, won the Flourish new opera competition in 2012. The adaptation premiered at the King's Head Theatre in 2013.

== Reviews ==
- The Observer
- The Times
- The Independent
- Time Out
