= 100 Bullets Back =

English dance pop duo

- Origin: Oxford, England
- Genres: Electro, dance, pop
- Years active: 2003–2011
- Members: David Clayton; Noel Pearson

100 Bullets Back are an English electro/dance/pop duo from Oxford, England consisting of David Clayton (keyboards, synthesizers, bass guitar, backing vocals, programming) and Noel Pearson (vocals, guitars, synthesizers, programming). They have released two studio albums, five singles and two EPs. They played their last gig in early 2011 as part of a one-off reunion show at Abort, Retry, Fail?, and are currently on long term hiatus as they explore other projects.

== Early history ==
Clayton and Pearson first met at The Henry Box School in Witney, Oxfordshire when Clayton joined the Sixth Form after moving to the area. Realising a shared interest in music (particularly the bassoon) and especially the thriving Brit Pop scene, the two formed their first band, 'The Hairy Palmers' with friend James Wood. The shambolic acoustic based outfit never performed live and although primarily played covers, saw the two write their first songs together.

After finishing school, both Clayton and Pearson attended Staffordshire University. With the demise of 'The Hairy Palmers', the two started writing original material in earnest under the guise of 'Cider and Black'. A cassette entitled Cider and Black: The demos was recorded live and showcased an acoustic, Brit Pop sound of original material. A few live acoustic performances took place before the band changed their name to 'Atticus' and began to introduce electric guitars into their material. This was relatively short lived however as the band soon disbanded when the two went backpacking around the world, only reuniting for a couple of open mic events when the two met up in Sydney, Australia.

On returning from their travels, the pair decided to form a fully amplified live band which saw Pearson taking up guitar and vocal duties while Clayton took up the bass and vocals. Needing a drummer, David's brother Martyn Clayton was recruited. Martyn had learnt the drums while the others had been away and had spent the previous year playing in local metal bands. Martyn's main input however was that of choosing the band name, '100 Bullets Back'. The trio rehearsed in the Clayton's parents garage and played their first gigs together later that year, with a set consisting of new original material and some favourite covers such as Pet Shop Boys "Opportunities", The Kinks "Waterloo Sunset" and Martyn's version of Elvis's "Hound Dog".

== First recordings ==
After only a handful of gigs and one live recording "Clipped", the band ventured into the studio to record their first demo proper, Significant Silence EP. Needing piano on a couple of songs, the band brought in school friend Andrea Johnston for the recordings, but were so happy with her input, asked her to join permanently. The new line up started gigging regularly around Oxford and Reading whilst developing their bank of songs and ventured into the studio once again to record another demo, The Violence EP, in 2003. With this recording, the musical direction of the band began to move away from Martyn's own personal taste and he soon decided to leave the band. A new drummer, Helen Stevenson-Miller was soon brought in.

The Violence EP and local shows soon caught the ear of Reading promoter and record label owner Sid Siddle, who chose to put the band on numerous times at his Club Velocity night before deciding to release the band's debut 7" single on his Velocity Recordings label the following year.

== Singles ==
With their new line up, the band decided on recording a new track for their first full single release. Taking a more electronic direction but coupled with their live energy, the band released "The Lost Souls Club" 7" in 2004 to good reviews. Radio airplay was achieved both locally on BBC stations and nationally on the Claire Sturgess XFM show. During this busy period, Andrea grew tired of gigging and decided to leave the band before the follow-up single "I Know" was recorded later that year. Again well received, this second 7" single showcased a much more electronic sound using sequencers and synthesizers over dance beats. This period also saw the band play their biggest gigs to date supporting Bloc Party, TV on the Radio and The Zutons. Again however, this time due to work commitments, Helen also had to leave the band and was replaced by Scott McFadzean for a number of gigs before ex-The Candyskins John Halliday took over on drums. Some gigs also saw Brett Gordon (also ex-The Candyskins) fill in on bass guitar, as Clayton began to take over full-time keyboard duties.

== Refute Fake Icons ==
The band's debut album was recorded over a month and quickly took an electro pop direction with songs based around keyboards and sequencers and often using programmed beats. The album was recorded by John Halliday who also played the live drum parts, at Shonk Studio in Oxford and was produced by the band and Halliday. The album was released to generally positive reviews in September 2005 and was toured by Clayton and Pearson as a duo throughout England. A short tour of Italy also saw interest in the band spread through Europe with airplay in countries such as Spain, Italy, France, Germany and Serbia. In the US, DJ Rodney Bingenheimer also championed the record, regularly playing tracks such as "West End", "The Lost Souls Club" and "I KnOw" on his KROQ radio show, Rodney on the Roq.

== Abort, Retry, Fail? ==
By the summer of 2006, Clayton and Pearson had struck up a friendship with Oxford music scenesters Michael Barry and Jason Philip. A shared desire to set up their own club night dedicated to electro/club music incorporating bands and DJs, saw the foursome set up and run the Abort, Retry, Fail? (ARF?) night at The Cellar in Oxford for two years. Notable shows included three hedonistic live appearances by Foals and sold-out gigs by Friendly Fires, CocknBull Kid, Fuck Buttons and Youth Movies.

Although primarily DJs, Philip and Barry joined the 100 Bullets Back live line up on guitar and keyboards respectively and played the inaugural ARF? club night. Although Philip soon left the band, Barry played numerous live gigs including memorable support slots with Friendly Fires, Shy Child and Metronomy and a slot at Oxfordshire's 2007 Truck Festival before leaving the band in late 2008. Like many contemporary artists Metronomy have used MySpace to promote and release music. Joseph has in the past uploaded unreleased remixes and covers from the likes of 100 Bullets Back, Britney Spears, Bright Eyes and U2 as well as his own original material.

== A duty to Yourself and thy Neighbour ==
Over the next couple of years, organising ARF? and general "life" kept 100 Bullets Back live appearances to a minimum, only venturing out for two of Oxford's famous annual "Your Song" covers nights at The Zodiac. Clayton and Pearson continued to write and record new songs however which would form their second album. With only the release of the limited edition free giveaway CD Under 21 Girls at a live performance at the Truck Festival (2007) between albums, a wealth of material was recorded. Taking a more DIY approach than the first album, recordings took place in various locations such as bedrooms, garages, front rooms and studios. A number of different people were involved in the recording process, allowing the duo to try new ideas and inject a fresh sound.

The band's second album A duty to Yourself and thy Neighbourwas released on download through Velocity Recordings and as a limited edition CD through the band's own ARF? Recordings label in July 2010. The album is heavily influenced by the two years the band had running their ARF? club night and has a much heavier electro/dance feel than their first album. Lighter moments are scattered across the record but distort and denser sounds prevail. The record was produced by former Suitable Case for Treatment guitarist Jimmy "Evil" Heatherington who the band had worked with as the ARF? sound engineer over the previous two years.

"All These DJs" was released as a downloadable single by Velocity Recordings in August 2010 to promote the album.

== Remixes ==
Due to the nature of many of the tracks on A duty to Yourself and thy Neighbour, a number of songs have been remixed by other DJs and bands. Three of these were included on a white label promo CD prior to the album's release, these being "All These DJs" (Player Player remix), "Nervousness" (Richard Wyatt remix) and "Genocide" (Coloureds remix).

== Discography ==
Year	Type	Name	Tracks
2003	Live CD	Clipped	Flashboy (live) Mrs. Jones (live) Rock 'n' Roll (Suicide) (live)
2003	CD EP	Significant Silence EP	Flashboy Mrs. Jones I Am Al Thesame Fighting in the Street
2003	CD EP	The Violence EP	Disco Beat Falling Down Violence
2004	7" single	The Lost Souls Club	The Lost Souls Club Violence
2004	7" single	I KnOw	I KnOw Bangkok (Everybody Needs Somebody To Love)
2005	CD album and download	Refute Fake Icons	DBM I KnOw Wichita Junk Food Violence February A Transmission of Joy West End Don't Follow Fashion (Buy Something That's Out of Date) Bangkok (4,2,1) Heart The Lost Souls Club
2006	Download single	West End	West End Antibiotic
2007	Ltd. Ed. CD single	Under 21 Girls	U21 Girls Fitness & Physique Simon U21 Girls (TJ Hertz Remix)
2010	CD album and download	A duty to Yourself and thy Neighbour	Ted Danson S.I.M.O.N. All These DJs Anger Management Co. German Dancing Musik Nervousness -Interlude- "ON" Genocide Michael's Holiday Never Meant A Thing NSA Fat Asssss!
2010	Download single	All These DJs	All These DJs
