= Mary Box =

English school founder (died 1679)

- Born: Mary Allen
- Died: 1679
- Known for: foundation of The Henry Box School
- Spouse: Henry Box

Mary Box born Mary Allen (died 1679) was the person who created The Henry Box School after her husband died after creating the school building. Today the school she created is named after Henry Box and the original building, he made, is named after her. She and Henry are credited as the school's founders which celebrated its 350th anniversary in 2010.

== Life ==
Box's date and place of birth are unknown. Her mother, Alice Long came from Whaddon, Wiltshire and her nephew was a politician named Walter Long. Her father, Ralph Allen, was a son of Sir William Allen who had been the Lord Mayor of London in 1572.

By 1623 she had become the second wife of Henry Box. Henry and Mary Box had seven children but only Ralph and Alice outlived their father. Henry was rich and getting richer by dealing in medicinal drugs. He was noted for being fined, and even briefly arrested, for refusing to serve as master of the Worshipful Company of Grocers, as a Sheriff of London and as an alderman of Bridge Within ward.

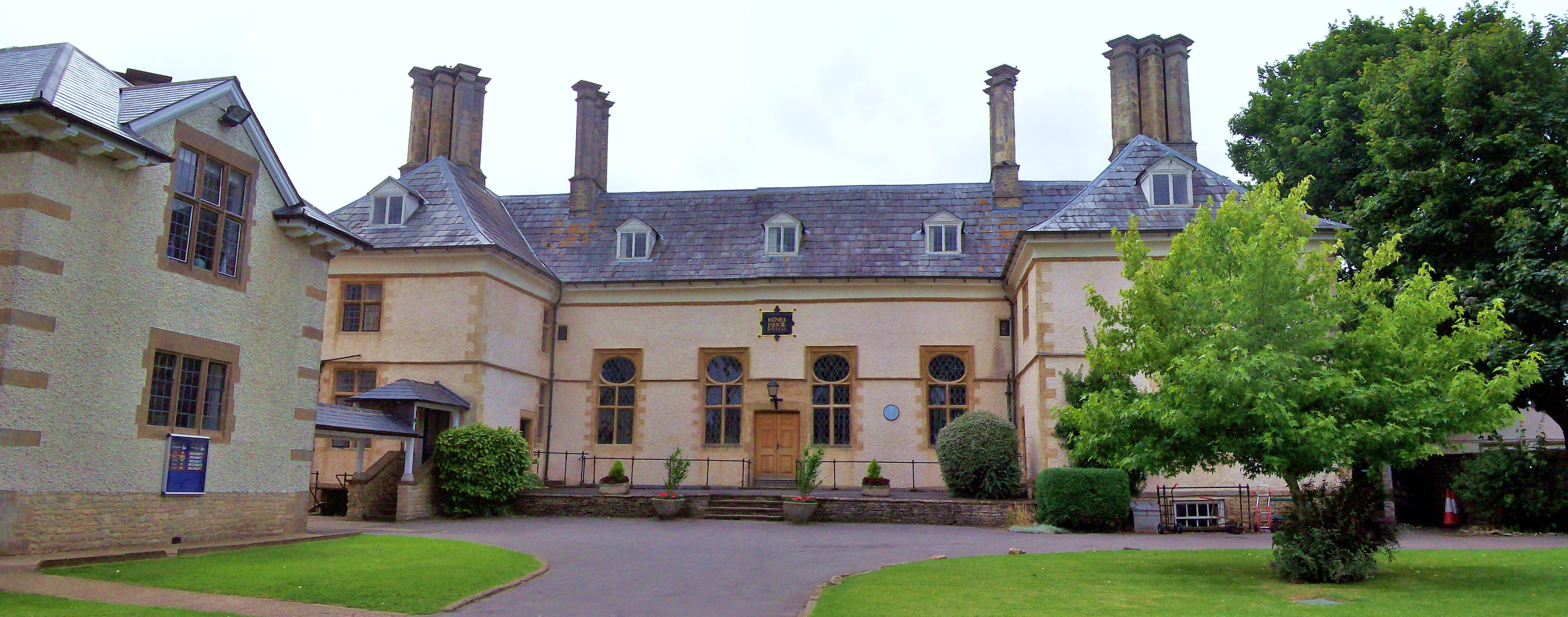
Henry Box built the Mary Box Building. Mary created the Henry Box school

Henry Box decided to endow a school in his hometown. The schoolhouse was completed in 1660 and is now a Grade II* listed building.

Mary Box completed the project using money left in his will. She arranged for an Act of Parliament to allow the school which gave her full control of the school. It was Mary Box who had laid down all the initial rules for the school. She had shaped the boys' school during the time of the first two headmasters.

In honour of the school's foundation, Oriel College, Oxford (of which Henry Box had been a student) and the Worshipful Company of Grocers (of which Henry Box had refused to be the elected Master) both supplied four governors. They continue to sponsor one member of the school's governing body each.

She died in 1679.
