= Abdelmegid Moustafa Farrag =

Egyptian educator

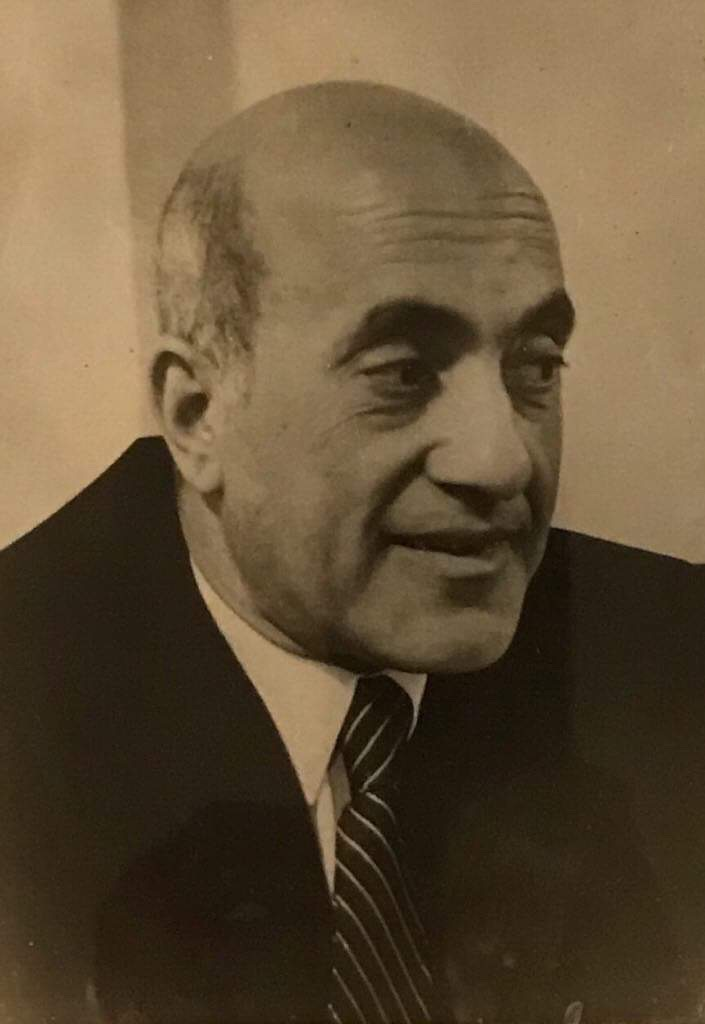
- Dr. Abdelmegid Moustafa Farrag
- Born: January 5, 1928; Mallawi, Egypt
- Died: January 31, 2002 (aged 74); Cairo, Egypt
- Occupation: Dean, Institute of Statistical Studies and Research of Egypt,

Abdelmegid Moustafa Farrag (5 January 1928 – 31 January 2002) عبد المجيد مصطفى فراج was a Social Studies Educator and a Statistics and Demography Studies authority who also served as Professor at the Cairo Faculty of Commerce and Cairo Faculty of Economics and Political Science in Egypt and later as the Dean of the Institute of Statistical Studies and Research in Cairo, Egypt.

== Academic career ==
In 1948, Abdelmegid Moustafa Farrag obtained his B.Sc. degree in Economics from the Faculty of Commerce in Cairo, Egypt, and in 1950 he earned a diploma in Statistics from the same school. In 1952 he earned a diploma in Commerce and in 1954 a master's degree in Socio-Economical Development and Planning both from the University of Birmingham, UK. In 1957 he obtained his Ph.D. degree in Demography and Population Studies from the London School of Economics, UK. His doctorate thesis was titled "Demographic Developments in Egypt During the Present Century."

== Post-academic career ==
From 1950 until 2002 he served as lecturer, associate professor, professor and department head at several institutions in Cairo, Egypt and the United Arab Emirates. His last academic post was Dean of the Institute of Statistical Studies and Research in Cairo, Egypt from 1983 to 1988.

From 1962 to 1968 he served as Staff Member at the International Labor Office (ILO) in Geneva, Switzerland and during the period 1970 to 1992 he served as UN Chief Technical Advisor for Yemen and Iraq and Regional Advisor UN Fund for Population Activities for all Arab countries and Afghanistan, Iran and Turkey, and Secretary General of the Supreme Council for Human Resources for the Prime minister's Office in Cairo, Egypt.

In addition of being a world expert in Statistics and Demography, Prof. Farrag was a prolific thinker and many of his reform thoughts and ideas were published in many Egyptian newspapers and magazines such as Al-Ahram Al-Yawmy (الأهرام اليومي) and Al-Ahram Al-Ektesady (الأهرام الاقتصادي) during the period 1958 to 2001. Prof. Farrag's progressive thoughts were also published in four Arabic books, namely: دبلوماسية التنمية و دبلوماسية المراسم , إستثمار التخلف في ظل العولمة, المسألة السكانية - التشخيص والعلاج, أحوال مصر في نصف قرن - see publications 4 to 7 below.

== Awards ==
Dr. Farrag received several awards in Egypt for his work:

- 1983 - 1st Order of Science and Arts,

- 1995 - Ministry of Population Award, and

- 1997 - State Merit Award in the field of Social Sciences. جائزة الدولة التقديرية فى العلوم الاجتماعية - See reference 10

== Publications ==
1- https://librarysearch.lse.ac.uk/primo-explore/search?vid=44LSE_VU1&tab=default_tab&indx=1&bulkSize=10&dym=true&highlight=true&displayField=title&query=any,contains,X28,407&search_scope=CSCOP_ALL

2- https://www.tandfonline.com/doi/abs/10.1080/00324728.1964.10405507?journalCode=rpst20

3- http://kohahq.searo.who.int/cgi-bin/koha/opac-detail.pl?biblionumber=18534

4- دبلوماسية التنمية و دبلوماسية المراسم - Year 1987

5- إستثمار التخلف في ظل العولمة ISBN 977-02-6130-0 Year: 2001 دار المعارف See: https://www.al-jazirah.com/culture/14042003/tatb95.htm

6- المسألة السكانية - التشخيص والعلاج ISBN 977-5427-03-7

7- أحوال مصر في نصف قرن - Dar EgyMisr Printing and Publishing 1999

8- http://cedej.bibalex.org/DocumentFrm.aspx?documentID=177637&lang=ar&Author=%D8%B1%D8%A7%D8%AC%D9%8A%D8%A9+%D8%AD%D9%85%D8%AF%D9%89%2c%D8%A7%D8%AD%D9%85%D8%AF+%D8%B9%D8%A8%D8%AF%D8%A7%D9%84%D8%B9%D8%B2%D9%8A%D8%B2+%D9%81%D8%B1%D8%A7%D8%AC%2c%D8%B9%D8%A8%D8%AF%D8%A7%D9%84%D9%85%D8%AC%D9%8A%D8%AF+%D9%81%D8%B1%D8%A7%D8%AC

9- King Fahd National Library: http://ecat.kfnl.gov.sa:88/ipac20/ipac.jsp?session=P555785V5989F.190814&profile=akfnl&uindex=BAW&term=%D9%81%D8%B1%D8%A7%D8%AC%20%D8%8C%20%D8%B9%D8%A8%D8%AF%D8%A7%D9%84%D9%85%D8%AC%D9%8A%D8%AF%20%D9%85%D8%B5%D8%B7%D9%81%D9%89&aspect=basic_search&menu=search&source=172.27.18.30@!kfnl1256

10- Statistics via mathematics : an open debate See: https://iase-web.org/documents/papers/icots3/BOOK1/A5-4.pdf

11- http://cedej.bibalex.org/Results.aspx?SearchType=Advanced&lang=fr&Date=1988&publisher=El-Ahram&subject=Travail%20Et%20Emploi&author=Abdel%20Meguid%20Farrag

12- https://www.tandfonline.com/doi/abs/10.1080/00324728.1964.10405507
