= Baba Faraj Tabrizi =

Baba Faraj Tabrizi (died 1172/73) was an Iranian Sufi shaykh ("master") of the 12th century. He is also known as Gajili, due to his khaniqah (Sufi lodge) and tomb being situated in the Gajil district of Tabriz.

He is known to have spoken the northwestern Iranian vernacular of Tabrizi.

== Sources ==
- Lornejad, Siavash; Doostzadeh, Ali (2012). Arakelova, Victoria; Asatrian, Garnik (eds.). On the modern politicization of the Persian poet Nezami Ganjavi (PDF). Caucasian Centre for Iranian Studies. Archived from the original (PDF) on 2022-09-14.
- Masoud Jalali-Moqaddam, Masoud (2015). "Bābā Faraj Tabrīzī". In Madelung, Wilferd; Daftary, Farhad (eds.). Encyclopaedia Islamica Online. Brill Online. ISSN 1875-9831.
