= Faraj Beygi =

Faraj Beygi فرج بيگي
- Village
- Location within Iran
- Coordinates: 28°29′06″N 54°27′57″E
- Country: Iran
- Province: Fars
- County: Zarrin Dasht
- Bakhsh: Central
- Rural District: Zirab

Population (2006)
  - Total: 580
- Time zone: UTC+3:30 (IRST)
  - Summer (DST): UTC+4:30 (IRDT)

Faraj Beygi (Persian: فرج بيگي, also known as Faraj Beygī (romanized) and as Shahrak-e Yamīnābād) is a village in Zirab Rural District, in the Central District of Zarrin Dasht County, Fars province, Iran. According to the 2006 census, its population was 580 people from 124 families.
