= Marina Lewycka =

British novelist (1946–2025)

Marina Lewycka Марина Левицька
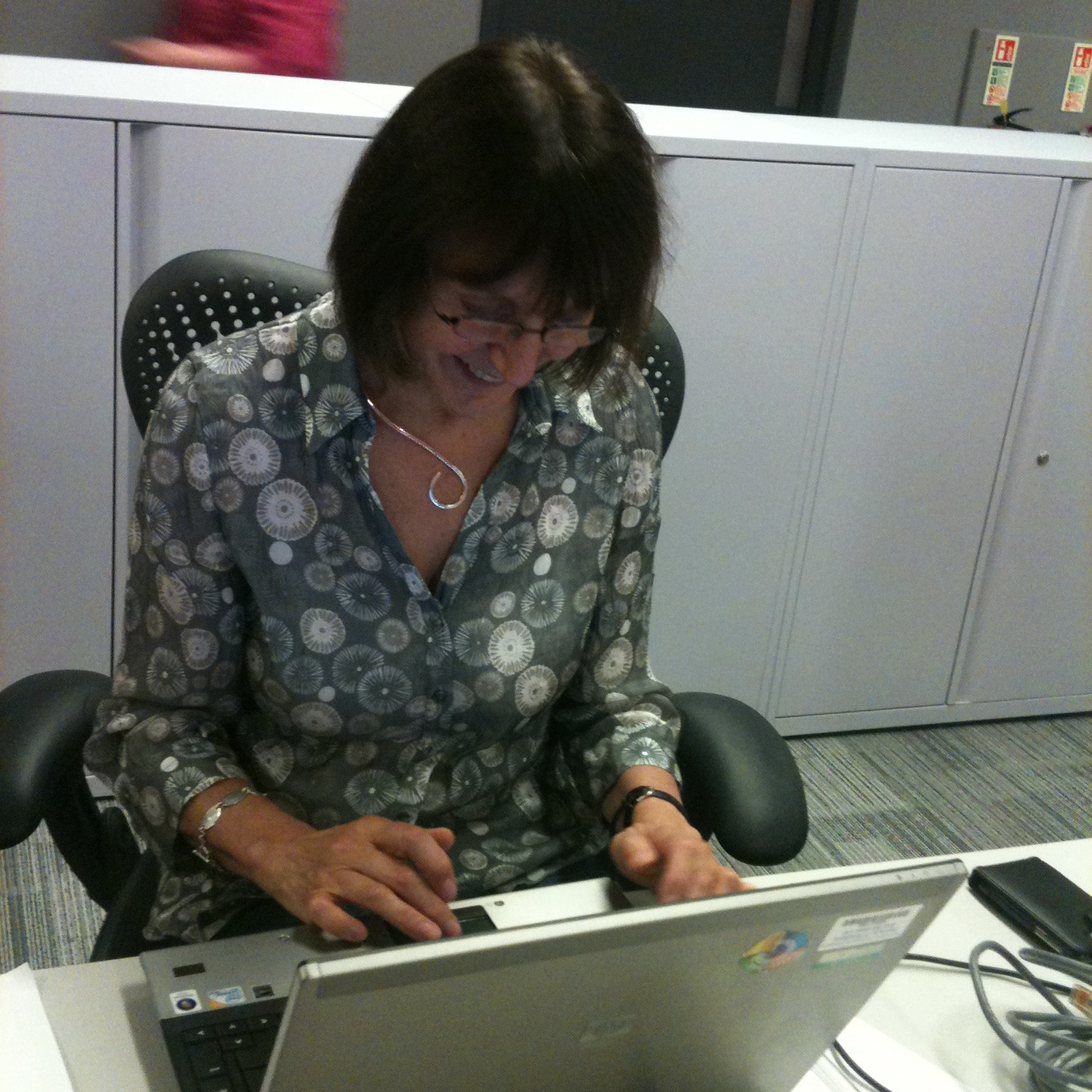
- Lewycka live chats from London in 2012
- Born: 12 October 1946; Kiel, Schleswig-Holstein, Germany
- Died: 11 November 2025 (aged 79); London, England
- Education: Keele University; University of York
- Writing career
- Years active: 2005–2020
- Notable work: A Short History of Tractors in Ukrainian
- Notable awards: Bollinger Everyman Wodehouse Prize; Waverton Good Read Award

Marina Lewycka (/lɛˈvɪtskə/ Le-VITZ-ka; 12 October 1946 – 11 November 2025) was a Ukrainian-British lecturer and novelist. Her 2005 debut comic novel, A Short History of Tractors in Ukrainian, was translated into over 30 languages.

== Early life and education ==
Lewycka was born in a refugee camp in Kiel on 12 October 1946. Her family subsequently moved to England; she lived in Sheffield, South Yorkshire. She attended Gainsborough High School for Girls in Gainsborough, Lincolnshire, then Witney Grammar School in Witney, Oxfordshire. She graduated from Keele University in 1968 with a BA degree in English and Philosophy, and from the University of York with a BPhil in English Literature in 1969. She began, but did not complete, a PhD at King's College London.

== Career ==
Lewycka was a lecturer in media studies at Sheffield Hallam University until her retirement in March 2012.

== Works ==
Lewycka's debut novel A Short History of Tractors in Ukrainian won the 2005 Bollinger Everyman Wodehouse Prize for comic writing at the Hay literary festival, the 2005/6 Waverton Good Read Award, and the 2005 Saga Award for Wit; it was long-listed for the 2005 Man Booker Prize and short-listed for the 2005 Orange Prize for Fiction. The novel has been translated into 35 languages.

Her second novel Two Caravans was published in hardback in March 2007 by Fig Tree (an imprint of Penguin Books) for the United Kingdom market, and was short-listed for the 2008 Orwell Prize for political writing. In the United States and Canada it is published under the title Strawberry Fields.

Lewycka's third novel, We Are All Made of Glue, was released in July 2009, and her fourth novel, Various Pets Alive and Dead, came out in March 2012. Her fifth novel, published in 2016, was The Lubetkin Legacy, named after Berthold Lubetkin, the Georgian-born modernist architect, who built popular housing with the slogan: "Nothing is too good for ordinary people". The Lubetkin Legacy was shortlisted for the Bollinger Woodhouse Everyman for Comic Fiction prize.

In 2009, Lewycka donated the short story "The Importance of Having Warm Feet" to Oxfam's Ox-Tales project, four collections of UK stories written by 38 authors. Her story was published in the 'Earth' collection. Later the same year, she donated a second short story, "Business Philosophy", to the Amnesty International anthology Freedom: Short Stories Celebrating the Universal Declaration of Human Rights.

In 2020, Lewycka released the novel The Good, the Bad and the Little Bit Stupid. A review of the book in The Spectator noted that its commentary on Brexit and organ trafficking "seem not so much disparate as random".

In addition to her fiction, Lewycka wrote a number of books giving practical advice for carers of elderly people, published by the charity Age Concern.

== Death ==
Lewycka died on 11 November 2025, at the age of 79, while suffering from multiple system atrophy.
