= Ein Farraj =

Ein Farraj عين فراج
- Village
- Location in Syria
- Coordinates: 35.016079°N 36.228093°E
- Country: Syria
- Governorate: Hama
- District: Masyaf District
- Subdistrict: Wadi al-Uyun Nahiyah

Population (2004)
  - Total: 190
- Time zone: UTC+3 (AST)
- City Qrya Pcode: C3430

Ein Farraj (Arabic: عين فراج) is a Syrian village located in Wadi al-Uyun Nahiyah in Masyaf District, Hama. According to the Syria Central Bureau of Statistics (CBS), Ein Farraj had a population of 190 in the 2004 census.
