= Political positions of Nigel Farage =

Views and voting record of the British politician

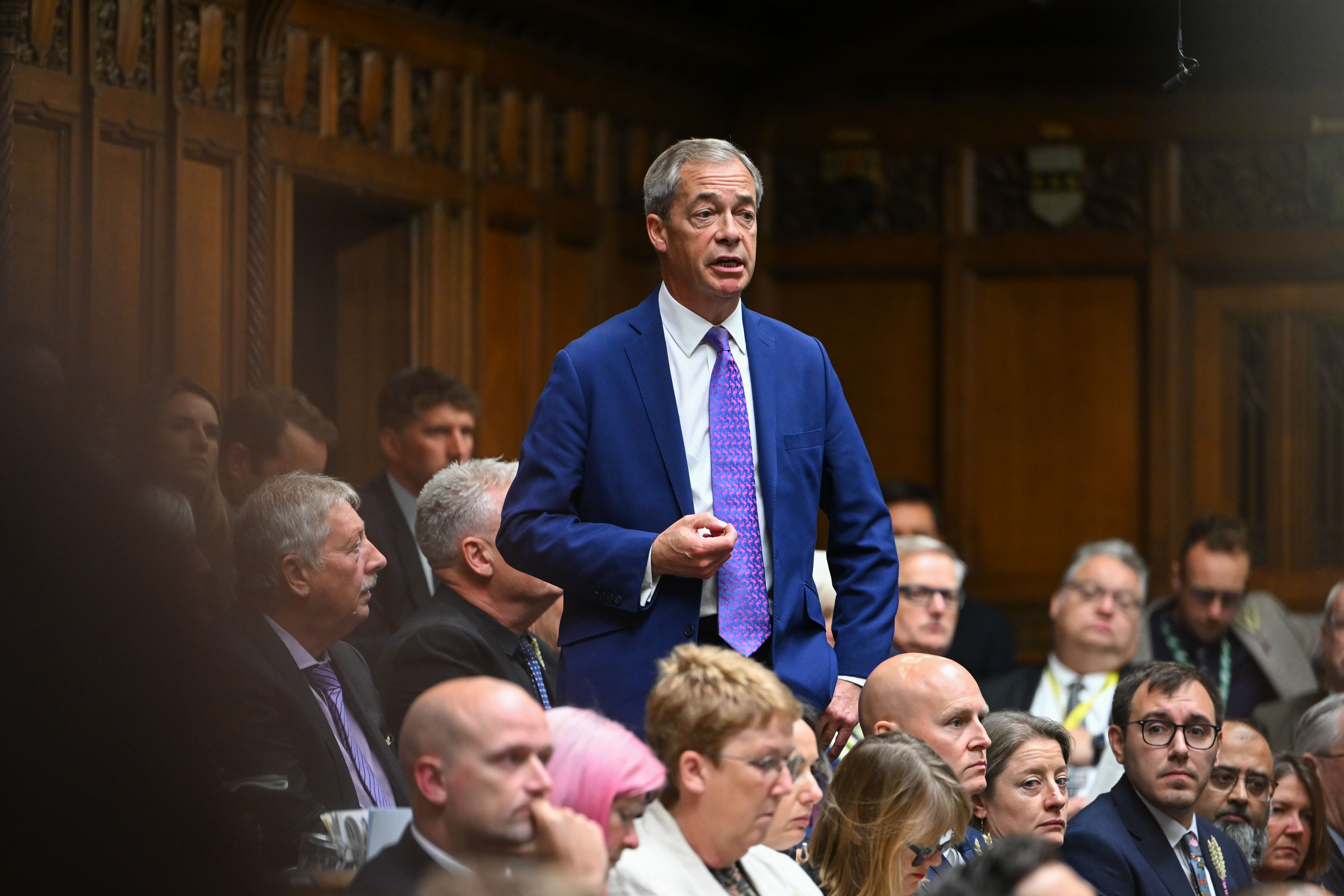
Farage speaks during Prime Minister's Questions in 2024.

Nigel Farage is a British politician and broadcaster who has been Member of Parliament (MP) for Clacton and the Leader of Reform UK since 2024, having previously been its leader from 2019 to 2021 when it was called the Brexit Party. He also was the leader of the UK Independence Party (UKIP) from 2006 to 2009, and 2010 to 2016. Farage served as a Member of the European Parliament (MEP) for South East England from 1999 until the UK's withdrawal from the European Union (EU) in 2020.

A prominent Eurosceptic since the early 1990s, Farage's right-wing views on issues such as immigration have attracted significant media attention throughout his political career. He is known for his distinctive character and style, including his personality, fashion, and social media presence, as well as his form of British right-wing populism. In foreign policy, Farage is an outspoken supporter of US President Donald Trump. In 2014 he spoke of admiring Vladimir Putin while later disliking him personally amidst the Russian invasion of Ukraine which Farage condemned as "immoral, outrageous and indefensible".

In the 2024 United Kingdom election, Farage aunched the Reform UK manifesto, which they called a "contract" (Our Contract with You). It pledged to lower taxes, lower immigration, increase funding for public services, reform the NHS and decrease its waiting lists to 'zero', bring utilities and critical national infrastructure under 50% public ownership (the other 50% owned by pension funds), replace the House of Lords with a more democratic second chamber, and to replace first-past-the-post voting with a system of proportional representation. It also pledged to accelerate transport infrastructure in coastal regions, Wales, the North, and the Midlands. The party also wants to freeze non-essential immigration and recruit 40,000 new police officers. Reform UK oppose the UK government's current net zero target. Instead, it pledged to support the environment with more tree planting, more recycling and less single-use plastics.

== Economy ==
After taking office as a UKIP MEP in 1999, Farage has often voiced opposition to the "euro project". His argument is that "a one-size-fits-all interest rate" cannot work for countries with structurally different economies, often using the example of Greece and Germany to emphasise contrast. In 2011, Farage opposed the use of bailouts and says that "buying your own debt with taxpayers' money" will not solve the problem and that, "if we do, the next debt crisis won't be a country ... it will be the European Central Bank itself". On the issue of welfare, Farage said in 2014 he wanted migrants to live in the UK for five years before being able to claim benefits, and for them to be ineligible for tax credits. Farage has referred to the Financial Conduct Authority as a "disaster" for the British banking sector and called for its abolition. He supports restoring regulatory power back to the Bank of England. Farage has also supported ending interest payments on Bank of England reserves.

During the 1990s and 2010s, Farage supported economic liberalism and has praised the policies of Margaret Thatcher for reforming the British economy, stating in 2018 "It was painful for some people, but it had to happen."

More recently, Farage has shifted to call for a policy of reindustrialisation, including the reintroduction of coal mining in Britain, and nationalisation of UK steel producing companies. In 2025, Farage called for the re-opening of the blast furnaces of the Port Talbot Steelworks which had been closed down in September 2024 costing around 2,000 people in Port Talbot their jobs. Farage also supports the renationalisation of British Steel describing it as a "vital strategic asset" and has opposed British Steel's sale to the Chinese company Jingye Group. During an appearance at the 2025 Bitcoin Conference, Farage said he would cut the capital gains tax on cryptocurrency from 24% to 10% and create a "Bitcoin digital reserve" within the Bank of England. The Institute for Fiscal Studies, an independent economic thinktank, criticised the planned economic policies set out in Our Contract with You, Reform UK's manifesto before the 2024 UK general election. They said the costs of tax cuts and spending increases and savings proposed "do not add up" and were based on "extremely optimistic assumptions".

=== Taxation ===
In 2015 he suggested that tax avoidance was caused by "punitive tax rates".

In Our Contract with You, the party pledged to increase the starting income tax threshold from £12,570 to £20,000, which the Institute for Fiscal Studies estimated would cost between £50 and £80 billion each year. It also committed to cutting corporation tax from 25% to 20%, to subsequently drop even further to 15%, as well as to increase the Value-Added Tax (VAT) threshold for businesses from £90,000 to £150,000. In 2025, Farage called for the abolition of inheritance tax describing it as a "really nasty tax and it hits people at the most unpleasant part of their lives." As leader of Reform UK, Farage called for the introduction of a Britannia Card initiative in which those with Non-domiciled status can pay an annual £250,000 fee with proceeds going to British citizens on lower incomes in exchange for avoiding certain wealth taxes.

== Electoral reform ==
During the campaigning before the UK voting system referendum of May 2011, which offered the two options of a continuation of first-past-the-post voting or an alternative vote system, Farage declared himself in favour of the latter, saying that a continuation of first-past-the-post would be a "nightmare" for UKIP, although he also said that AV would make little difference to UKIP's fortunes. The party's stance was decided by its central policy-making committee, although Farage expressed a preference for the AV+ system as it "would retain the constituency link and then also the second ballot ensured there were no wasted votes".

After the 2015 general election, in which UKIP took a much lower proportion of seats than votes, Farage called the first-past-the-post voting system (FPTP) "totally bankrupt". He had said in 2011: "I completely lost faith in [FPTP] in 2005 when Blair was returned with a 60 seat majority on 36 per cent of the vote, or 22 per cent if you factor in low turnout." In 2019, Farage was a signatory to a cross-party declaration alongside the Liberal Democrats, Green Party of England and Wales and the Scottish National Party which called for electoral reform.

During a 2022 phone-in discussion on GB News, Farage said that he favoured abolishing the House of Lords stating "it's bloated, it's ludicrous, it's packed with hundreds and hundreds of David Cameron's mates and Blair's mates" and acknowledged that while the hereditary system had flaws, hereditary peers had represented geographical diversity across the United Kingdom while saying that the current appointed peers are "all living in the same postcodes in central London." Despite his calls to abolish the House of Lords, Farage wrote to Keir Starmer in August 2025 to request that Reform UK be allowed to nominate peers into the upper chamber, arguing this was needed to address "the democratic disparity" in the Lords.

Farage opposed lowering the voting age to 16, arguing that the voting age should be kept at an age where people are allowed to run as political candidates. Despite this, some political analysts have argued that Reform UK could benefit from lowering the voting age. Farage has also called for the abolition of postal voting, often arguing that it has been a source of electoral fraud. Data from the 2024 UK general election showed no evidence of large-scale electoral fraud. Of the 445 allegations of electoral fraud in 2024, 94% "resulted in the police taking no further action or were locally resolved through words of advice to those involved" according to The Electoral Commission. In their 2024 manifesto, Reform UK pledged to hold a referendum on establishing proportional representation within the House of Commons.

== Environment ==
Farage has been sceptical regarding the scientific consensus on climate change and has opposed measures designed to tackle global warming. In 2013, Farage criticised David Cameron's policy on wind turbines, describing it as covering "Britain in ugly disgusting ghastly windmills". An official energy policy document produced by UKIP while Farage was leader of the party stated that "UKIP strongly supports a clean environment and clean air", stressing that "coal-fired power stations must use clean technology to remove sulphur and nitrogen oxides, particulates and other pollutants". In a speech made to the European parliament on 11 September 2013, Farage cited a news story that the Arctic Sea ice cap had apparently grown from 2012 to 2013, saying that this was evidence of decades "of Euro-federalism combined with an increasing Green obsession", despite this being a minor milestone in a larger trend of sea ice decline.

In a 2015 interview with Spiked magazine, Farage said: "I haven't got a clue whether climate change is being driven by carbon-dioxide emissions." He also stated that climate change "is like a religion. And you're demonised if you question it. Ostracised completely."

A 2024 commentary piece by London School of Economics scholars Bob Ward and Pallavi Sethi noted that Farage had moderated his views on climate change by acknowledging it as an issue in the Reform UK manifesto for the 2024 United Kingdom general election. During an interview with Nick Robinson on the BBC's Panorama, Farage disputed claims that he did not accept that there was a climate crisis, saying "I'm not arguing the science" on climate change but stated: "I do think that ever since the late 1980s that perhaps there has been a bit of hype around this, and that perhaps is wrong." Farage and Reform have campaigned to scrap net zero targets and focus on fast-tracking clean nuclear energy with new Small Modular Reactors and North Sea gas and oil licences.

In February 2025, Farage said that it was "absolute nuts" to call carbon dioxide a pollutant. He said that man-made emissions account for about 3% of the world's annual CO2 emissions. BBC Verify said that is misleading given that without human emissions, the amount of CO2 created would be broadly equal to the amount absorbed and so CO2 levels would remain constant. Nasa say that human activity has been responsible for about 33% of the total CO2 in the atmosphere.

Farage has been a vocal critic of net zero and the policies undertaken by Labour Secretary of State for Energy Security and Net Zero Ed Miliband in particular. In 2025, he stated that Labour net zero policies had caused higher energy prices and impacted on the UK's steel industry, arguing "We think closing down the steel industry is good because it means our national CO2 output is down – and all that happens is the plant closes in Redcar. The plant closes in south Wales. It reopens in India under lower environmental standards and then the steel is shipped back to us." He has also referred to Labour's policies in government as "net-zero lunacy."

== Drugs and healthcare ==
=== Drugs ===
Farage has in the past taken an anti-prohibitionist position on recreational drugs. In an April 2014 phone-in interview hosted by The Daily Telegraph he argued that the war on drugs had been lost "many, many years ago", stating that "I hate drugs, I've never taken them myself, I hope I never do, but I just have a feeling that the criminalisation of all these drugs is actually not really helping British society." He argued in favour of a Royal Commission on drugs, which would explore all avenues as to how to legislate most effectively and deal with their related criminal and public health problems, including the possibility of their legalisation. In June 2024 ITV News reported that Farage had "changed his mind on the idea of drug reform, particularly cannabis", with Farage saying drug reform in the United States "hasn't really made much difference".

=== Smoking ban ===
In April 2013 Farage said that the smoking ban in enclosed public spaces was "silly and illiberal"; he recommended separate smoking areas along the lines of some German states. He said that banning things makes them more attractive to children, and stated that "Obesity is killing more people than smoking, you could ban chip shops, you could ban doughnuts. The point is we are big enough and ugly enough to make our own decisions".

=== NHS ===
In 2012, Farage said the NHS might have to be replaced with an insurance-based healthcare system. UKIP denied claims it wanted to privatise the NHS.

In his 2015 book Farage reflected that, based on his experiences, "the NHS is so over-stretched that if you can afford private health care, you should take it, particularly for diagnostics and preventative medicine. In the NHS, the system is so battered and poorly run that unless you are really lucky, you will fall through the cracks. The NHS is, however, astonishingly good at critical care. But what testicular cancer taught me is that the NHS will probably let you down if you need screening, fast diagnosis and an operation at a time that suits you". He supports reform within the NHS, saying that its resources have become stretched due to increased immigration, and blaming Labour for high costs of new hospitals built through private finance initiatives.

Farage said in 2015 that money which the NHS could have spent on treating taxpayers with serious conditions was instead being spent on recent immigrants with HIV. A YouGov poll found 50 per cent of those taking part supported Farage, with 37 per cent saying that he was scaremongering.

In July 2025, Farage said he would never privatise healthcare in the United Kingdom and would maintain the NHS as free at the point of charge. He also said: "If we could get a more efficient better funding model, provided we give free care at the point of delivery, I am prepared to consider anything." Farage has also suggested offering tax exemptions for frontline NHS medical staff to encourage more recruitment into the healthcare sector.

=== COVID-19 ===
In 2021, Farage expressed criticism of the British government's handling of COVID-19 lockdown policies, arguing they "cause more harm than good" and that only the elderly and most vulnerable should be isolated in order to provide "focused protection" from COVID-19.

=== World Health Organization ===
In May 2024, Farage suggested Britain should prepare to discuss leaving the World Health Organization in response to the WHO Pandemic Agreement and said it would infringe on the UK's political sovereignty by giving powers to the WHO to enforce lockdowns on countries and cede over Britain's control of vaccine stocks. The WHO in-turn said Farage was spreading misinformation about the Agreement. Farage is a co-founder of Action on World Health, an organization calling for the abolition of the WHO. The organization's funding is opaque, and it states that its funding sources are confidential.

== Education ==
Farage has stated that if he won power, he would remove university tuition fees for those studying STEM subjects (i.e. science, technology, engineering and maths), as well as medicine. He supports scrapping interest on student loans and to extending the loan capital repayment periods to 45 years.

== Immigration ==
=== Immigration policy ===
Since the 2000s, Farage has campaigned to reform and restrict Britain's immigration and asylum policies.

In 2014, Farage as then leader of UKIP argued that parts of Britain had become "unrecognisable" due to the impact of mass immigration over the past decade. He argued at the time that Britain should end free movement of people with the European Union and emulate an Australian-style points based immigration policy. In 2015, he called for a five year freeze on all unskilled immigration into the UK and said he wanted to return to "normal" levels of immigration, citing a figure of between 20,000 and 50,000 migrants given work permits. He also argued Britain had "zero control" of its borders under EU membership.

In 2024, Farage called for a complete freeze on "non-essential" immigration and immediate deportation of illegal immigrants. In 2025, Farage called for Britain to abolish Indefinite leave to remain (ILR) and replace it with a new system in which migrants would have to reapply for a new visa every five years with stricter requirements for residency. Farage also supported retracting ILR status from migrants already living in Britain in order to remove those who are using welfare, have committed crimes or entered the country illegally.

=== Muslim immigration ===
In August 2014 Farage said that he supported Muslim immigrants who can integrate into British society, but was against Muslim migrants who were "coming here to take us over", citing John Howard's Australia as a government to emulate in that regard. He told a Channel 4 documentary in 2015 that there was a "fifth column" of Islamic extremists in the United Kingdom and that British Muslims have "split loyalties" between their country and their faith. Farage has also argued that Muslim immigration to Britain and Europe has fuelled a rise in antisemitism and in an interview with LBC radio stated: "What's fuelling it is that there are many more Muslim voices, and some of those Muslim voices are deeply, deeply critical of Israel. In fact, some of them even question the right of Israel to exist as a nation."

In a May 2024 interview with Trevor Phillips on Sky News, Farage argued that a "growing number" of young Muslims in Britain reject or "loath" British values and suggested around 46% of British Muslim support Hamas in reference to a poll conducted by the Henry Jackson Society. He also accused Boris Johnson and Rishi Sunak of allowing migrants hostile to Britain into the country through lenient immigration policies.

At a press conference in May 2024, Farage defended his statements in the Sky News interview by arguing that a number of British Muslims held "views that aren’t just un-British, but views that frankly are extremely anti-British" and said Britain is moving towards "sectarian politics with women completely excluded." He has also accused the Labour Party of promoting sectarian politics to appeal to radical Muslims.

=== Enoch Powell ===
In 1994 Farage asked the former Conservative MP Enoch Powell to endorse UKIP and to stand for them, though Powell declined to do either. Farage said in 2014 that the "basic principle" of Powell's "Rivers of Blood" speech was correct, stating: "What he was warning about was the large influx of people into an area, that change an area beyond recognition, there is tension." Farage has also publicly spoken of his admiration for Powell, and has called him his political hero.

=== Romanians ===
In a 2014 interview on the LBC radio station, Farage said that he would feel "concerned" if a group of Romanian men moved next door to him. When interviewer James O'Brien inquired what would be the difference between Romanian men moving next door and a group of German children, in reference to Farage's German wife and children, Farage replied: "You know the difference." He later expanded on this on the UKIP website, stating that "if we were able to operate a proper work permit scheme for Romanian nationals, with suitable checks, as recommended by UKIP, then nobody would need to be concerned if a group of Romanian nationals moved in next door to them."

=== Syrian refugees ===
In 2013, Farage called for Britain and other Western countries to accept refugees from the Syrian civil war, saying: "I think this country should honour the 1951 declaration on refugee status ... the original ideas of defining what a refugee is were good ones and I think, actually, there is a responsibility on all of us in the free West to try and help some of those people fleeing Syria, literally in fear of their lives." He later said that those refugees should be of the country's Christian minority, due to the existence of nearer Muslim-majority safe countries. During the ensuing migration crisis, Farage alleged that the majority of people claiming to be refugees were economic migrants, and that some were Islamic State militants.

=== HIV immigrants ===
In an interview in 2014, Farage suggested that people with HIV should be banned from moving to the UK. During the televised debates in advance of the 2015 election, he said that "You can come into Britain from anywhere in the world and get diagnosed with HIV and get the retro-viral drugs that cost up to £25,000 per year per patient... What we need to do is to put the NHS there for British people and families, who in many cases have paid into the system for decades."

=== Eastern European migrants ===
In a 2015 interview Farage stated that he had a "slight preference" for immigrants from countries such as India and Australia compared to those from Eastern Europe, as they "are in some ways more likely to speak English, understand common law and have a connection with this country".

On 24 September 2025, during an interview on LBC, Farage said migrants from some eastern European countries had been poaching carp from ponds and eating swans from The Royal Parks. The Royal Parks and the RSPCA said that no incidents of people killing or eating swans had been reported in its parks. Full Fact found that though there are older reports of Eastern European migrants poaching carp, they could not identify any recent reports. Claims about migrants poaching swans have existed for over two decades. In 2003, similar allegations were reported under the "Swan Bake" story in the Sun, which falsely claimed Eastern European asylum seekers were illegally poaching and barbecuing swans. The problem of Eastern Europeans poaching carp had become so bad in 2012 that the Environment Agency had to set up anti-poaching patrols to prevent it.

=== Illegal immigrants ===
In 2013, Farage commented on the "Go Home" vans advertisements which recommended that illegal immigrants should "go home or face arrest"; he suggested that it was an attempt by the government to be seen to be "doing something" to appeal to UKIP voters and called the campaign's tone "nasty" and "unpleasant".

During the 2015 European migrant crisis, Farage said most of the migrants coming to Europe were economic migrants, and that thousands of Islamist terrorists were entering Europe among the migrants. During the Brexit referendum campaign, he defended the Breaking Point poster, which was criticised by those on both sides of the referendum debate, with George Osborne saying it had "echoes of literature used in the 1930s". In 2025, Farage said that he supported a mass deportation of illegal immigrants and argued that anyone caught entering Britain illegally should be deported. Farage has argued that the United Kingdom could see 'civil disorder' if illegal immigrants are not removed.

==== Deportations ====
Farage has previously distanced himself from a mass deportation policy, saying in September 2024 that it was a "political impossibility to deport hundreds of thousands of people" or support "mass deportations" more generally. He criticised Rupert Lowe after he voiced support for the action in a speech, saying it was "a very grave, dark, and dangerous use of language".

In August 2025, Farage and Reform UK shifted to support a mass deportation policy and announced a plan to deport approximately 600,000 illegal migrants, called 'Operation Restoring Justice', over the next five years if they were to win the next general election. In September 2025, Farage said that a Reform government would end all small boat migrant crossings within two weeks of taking power. Shortly afterwards he changed his pledge to say that this would happen within two weeks of Reform passing relevant legislation. When announcing Operation Restoring Justice, Farage said all illegal immigrants, including women and children, would be deported. He subsequently said the policy would be focused primarily on adult men and that women, children, and families would not be prioritised. He later refined his stance again a few days later, by stating that women would also be deported, including to Afghanistan. Farage also stated that his government would negotiate deals with countries like Eritrea, Iran, and Afghanistan to return illegal immigrants to them. A senior figure within The Taliban, who currently hold power in Afghanistan, said the country is "ready and willing" to work with Farage and accept Afghans deported from the country.

In September 2025, Farage stated that Reform UK would scrap Indefinite leave to remain (ILR) enabling migrants to qualify for permanent settlement in Britain after five years with Reform chairman Zia Yusuf saying the party would rescind ILR retrospectively to migrants who had been granted it.

=== Keir Starmer ===
In May 2025, responding to Starmer's press conference where he promised a significant fall in net migration by the end of the parliament, Farage accused Starmer of being "insincere" and warned he was "playing catch up" on the issue of immigration, stating: "I was using take back control in 2004. Keir Starmer has spent his whole career campaigning for free movement of people wholly unconcerned about this subject, so much so that their massive parliamentary majority was gained without immigration even being one of their five main priorities. Now, of course, he knows that amongst the great British public, this issue rates even higher than the health service. And he's just basically playing catch up with Reform."

== Foreign policy ==
=== European Union ===
Farage has been a proponent of British withdrawal from the European Union since the early 1990s and has been considered one of the most prominent eurosceptic politicians in British politics. Farage campaigned for a Leave vote during the 2016 United Kingdom European Union membership referendum and was named by media observers as a central figure in the ultimately successful campaign for Brexit during the vote.

Farage was initially a member of the Conservative Party but resigned in protest over John Major's government's signing of the Treaty on European Union at Maastricht in 1992. He has also said he voted for the Green Party in 1989 due to their eurosceptic policies at the time. Farage later joined the Anti-Federalist League in 1992 which was the precursor of UKIP and founded to oppose the Treaty.

=== European Convention on Human Rights ===
Farage supports British withdrawal from the European Convention on Human Rights (ECHR). He has often argued that the ECHR prevents the British government from deporting illegal immigrants and foreign criminals. He has said that, were he to enter government, he would seek to renegotiate the Good Friday Agreement to remove references to the ECHR.

=== Foreign intervention ===
Farage's position on interventionism has evolved over time, becoming more supportive of Western-led regime change. In 2013, Farage criticised sanctions on Iran, and in 2015, stated that migrant exodus from Libya had been caused by NATO military intervention in the civil war in Libya. However, in 2025 Farage called for the Iranian government to be "wiped out", and at the outbreak of the 2026 Iran war called for the United Kingdom to support the American and Israeli operation.

=== Australia ===
Farage has previously been supportive of the Liberal Party of Australia. In 2015, he praised the immigration policy of then-prime minister Tony Abbott. Farage had frequently endorsed an "Australian-style" points system of immigration for the United Kingdom. By 2018, Farage was more critical of the governing Liberal Party, saying "if in Australia there is not a greater connection with those who actually want patriotic values, for those who think that immigration needs looking at, for those who are really worried about energy prices, if the Liberal Party can't sort itself out, then something, a big shock will come along and replace it."

In 2019, while speaking at the Sydney Conservative Political Action Conference, Farage condemned Malcolm Turnbull as a "snake" who "pretended to be a conservative", and praised his successor Scott Morrison, who had ousted Turnbull in a leadership spill the year prior.

Some political commentators and journalists in Australia have compared Farage to One Nation leader Pauline Hanson. Farage has praised Hanson for drawing attention to immigration as an issue while also saying that he disagreed with some of her rhetoric and in 2022 described Hanson and the then opposition leader Peter Dutton as "important voices" in Australian politics but argued that Australian conservatives needed to do more to inspire voters.

=== New Zealand ===
Farage has personal contacts with NZ First leader and former deputy Prime Minister Winston Peters, describing him as a friend and an influence. Farage has also had contacts with ACT New Zealand leader David Seymour.

=== Austria ===
During the 2016 Austrian presidential election campaign, Farage said that Norbert Hofer, the Freedom Party candidate, would call for a "Brexit style referendum" if he won. Hofer, however, ruled out a referendum and asked Farage not to interfere in Austria's internal politics.

=== France ===
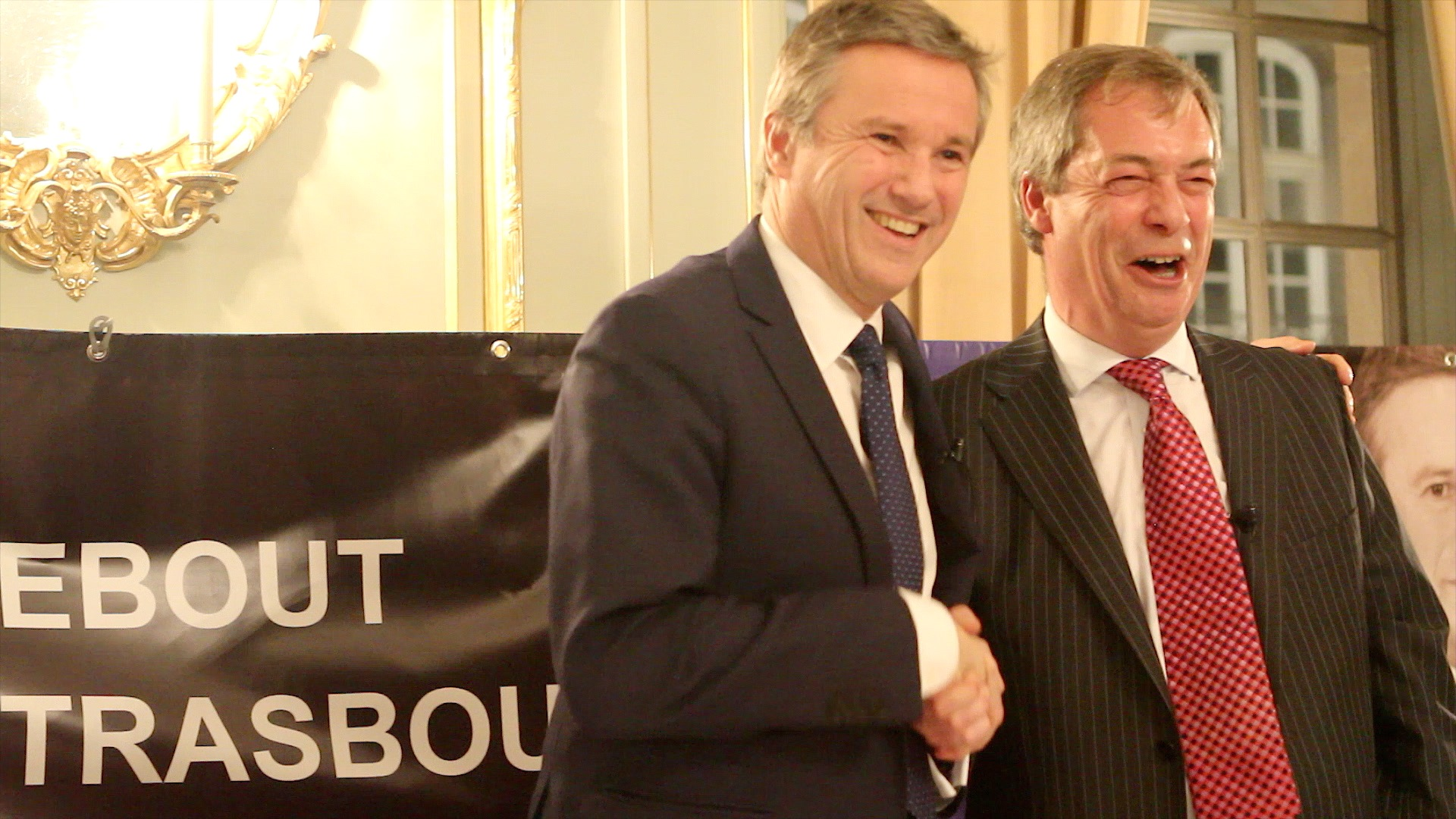
Farage with Nicolas Dupont-Aignan in 2013

Farage initially endorsed Nicolas Dupont-Aignan of Debout la France, another party of the Alliance for Direct Democracy in Europe, and later supported Marine Le Pen of the National Front, for the second round of the 2017 French presidential election. Farage said that the basis for his endorsement of Le Pen was his belief that she would be more sympathetic to the UK following Brexit, in contrast to the pro-European Emmanuel Macron. In 2017, Farage said Le Pen had successfully moderated her party from its previous image.

In 2018 Farage described French President Emmanuel Macron as a "globalist" who wanted "many more powers to be centralised in Brussels, powers taken from the member states".

Ahead of the 2024 French legislative election, Farage praised Le Pen for making her party "electable" but was sceptical of her economic policies.

=== Italy ===
Farage expressed praise for Italian Prime Minister Giorgia Meloni in 2024, arguing that she had successfully transformed the Brothers of Italy party to broaden its appeal among Italian voters and suggested that Meloni and her party should serve as a model for Reform UK to win a future general election and form a government. In an interview with GB News Farage suggested Britain should follow similar policies of Meloni's government on tackling illegal immigration.

Farage has had previous connections to the populist Five Star Movement under its leadership of Beppe Grillo.

=== China ===
In 2020, Farage said US President Donald Trump was right to refer to COVID-19 as the "Chinese virus", and also blamed China for the pandemic, saying "It really is about time we all said it. China caused this nightmare. Period."

In June 2020, he called tougher policies on China and boycotting "mass-produced Chinese rubbish", saying China showed its "true colours" during the COVID-19 pandemic. He said competition with China was "the biggest geopolitical struggle since the fall of the Berlin Wall 30 years ago" and said Trump needed to be re-elected to stop China from "effectively taking over the world".

In April 2021, Farage accused New Zealand of having "sold its soul to China" and weakening the Five Eyes. He criticised the use of facial recognition cameras by Essex Police, stating: "I don't want to live in China. I don't want to be tracked wherever I go."

In October 2024, after the British government announced it would hand over sovereignty of the Chagos Islands to Mauritius, Farage said "our American allies will be furious and Beijing delighted".

=== Germany ===
Farage spoke at a rally for the far-right Alternative for Germany party in advance of the 2017 German federal election, having been personally invited by the party's deputy leader Beatrix von Storch. By 2025, Farage had distanced himself from the AfD and did not publicly comment on the German election that year.

=== Iran ===
Farage's views on Iran have changed during his political career. He previously supported non-interventionism on the issue and opposed sanctions on Iran, and said in 2013 that he would not support an Israeli strike on Iranian nuclear facilities, stating: "I do not support acts of aggression, even from countries that feel their existence is threatened".

By 2018, Farage had changed his stance to becoming more strongly critical of the Iranian regime and endorsing regime change in the country. He condemned Labour leader Jeremy Corbyn's "record for standing up and defending this hardline Islamist regime" and declared that regime change was "absolutely the right thing" in Iran.

In 2024, Farage supported economic sanctions against Iran. He condemned the United Nations Security Council for holding a minute of silence for Iranian President Ebrahim Raisi. In November 2024, Farage called for the Iranian Islamic Revolutionary Guard Corps (IRGC) to be proscribed as a terrorist organisation. In 2025, Farage held a meeting with Reza Pahlavi, Crown Prince of Iran and in a post on Twitter expressed opposition to the Iranian government and reaffirmed his support for the British government to ban the IRGC.

Farage supported Israeli airstrikes against Iran during the Twelve-Day War, arguing Israel had "no choice" in the situation. In June 2025, Farage said he was opposed to "de-escalation" with Iran and instead wanted to see its "bloody awful regime" be "wiped out". In January 2026, Farage attended a solidarity rally outside of the Iranian Embassy in London in support of those participating in the 2025–2026 Iranian protests. He furthermore endorsed the removal of the Islamic regime by the Iranian people and praised Reza Pahlavi as a "positive influence" in leading protests against the regime.

Farage supported Israel and the USA from the outset of the 2026 Iran war. He criticised the decision by the Prime Minister, Keir Starmer, for the UK to not be involved in offensive strikes against Iran and to deny the USA access to UK military bases to enable them. In response, Farage said "The Prime Minister needs to change his mind on the use of our military bases and back the Americans in this vital fight against Iran!" He also stated his support for the US achieving regime change in Iran, one of their stated objectives for the conflict. When asked about his stance on Iran war being different than his views on Libyan and Iraq war, he responded, "Iran’s a genuine threat to the world … Iran potentially poses a bigger danger than Putin poses to us. I do feel this is different."

=== Israel and Gaza ===
Farage denounced the 2023 Hamas attack on Israel and in 2024 accused Starmer's government of not negotiating for the release of British hostage Emily Damari. He has also accused the Labour Party and the British left of "pandering to Hamas and the pro-Gaza as a side of the argument" in order to win sectarian support from extremist Muslims.

In May 2024, Farage opposed calls by the International Criminal Court (ICC) to issue an arrest warrant to Prime Minister of Israel, Benjamin Netanyahu following the actions of Israel in the Gaza war, arguing "there is no moral equivalence between a terrorist organisation and the prime minister of a country that is going after those terrorists to try and stop October 7th from happening again." On 21 November 2024, Farage again criticised the ICC's decision to issue arrest warrants for Benjamin Netanyahu and Yoav Gallant, saying the ICC "loses more credibility with each day that passes".

In February 2025, Farage said Trump's plan to "take over Gaza" is "very appealing" and that "I love that notion".

In June 2025, Farage denied that there is a genocide going on in Gaza and said that he would not support suspending weapons exports to Israel. He asserted, "I think we have to get back to the fundamental fact that what happened on October 7 [2023] was the most appalling violence committed by an organisation who said they will do it again and again and again." In July 2025, Farage stated that he opposed recognising a Palestinian state while Hamas exists, arguing "to do it now is wrong. It rewards terrorism."

Following the decision undertaken by Keir Starmer's Labour government to officially recognise the State of Palestine in September 2025, Farage spoke with Israeli foreign minister Gideon Sa'ar in which he condemned Starmer's decision.

=== Russia ===
In 2014, Farage said though he did not approve of him "politically" or "as a human being", the world leader he most admired "as an operator" was Putin, praising the Russian intervention in the Syrian civil war as "brilliant". Later, in 2015, he said about Putin that "The European Union, and the West, view Putin as the devil. They want to view Putin as the devil. I'm not saying I want take him around for tea and meet mum on Sunday afternoon ... But the point is, on this bigger overall battle [against ISIS in Syria] we need to start recognising we're on the same side".

Farage accused the EU of pursuing "imperialist, expansionist" ambitions in Ukraine, and of having "blood on its hands", by allegedly encouraging the 2014 Revolution of Dignity that toppled President Viktor Yanukovych after he refused to sign the European Union–Ukraine Association Agreement. He said he did not support Russia's annexation of Crimea but that EU leaders had been "weak and vain", adding: "if you poke the Russian bear with a stick, it will respond". In June 2024, Farage said that Russia's invasion of Ukraine was "immoral, outrageous and indefensible". He denied the accusation by Liberal Democrat leader Ed Davey that he was an "apologist or supporter of Putin", and clarified that he said he admired Putin "as a political operator, because he's managed to take control of running Russia". In a 2024 column for The Daily Telegraph Farage affirmed his belief that the West had made foreign policy errors towards Russia in the run-up to the Russian invasion of Ukraine but said "I am not and never have been an apologist or supporter of Putin."

In a 2025 interview with Bloomberg News, Farage hardened his position towards Putin referring to the Russian President as "not a rational man" and "a very bad dude" in response to accusations from opponents that he was soft on Russia. He furthermore added that if elected Prime Minister he would support shooting down Russian military aircraft if they attack NATO airspace and donating frozen Russian financial assets to Ukraine.

=== Ukraine ===
Farage has argued that the Russian invasion of Ukraine was a consequence of European political expansion into the region and that a diplomatic solution is needed to stop the conflict while also condemning the invasion itself and arguing that Ukraine should be free to choose NATO membership and that British armed forces should be sent to Ukraine as part of a multi-national peacekeeping force once both sides agree to a ceasefire. In February 2022, Farage said that the invasion of Ukraine was "A consequence of EU and NATO expansion ... It made no sense to poke the Russian bear with a stick. These are dark days for Europe". Writing in an opinion column for The Daily Telegraph in June 2024, Farage said that the invasion was "of course" the fault of Putin and condemned the war, writing "As a champion of national sovereignty, I believe that Putin was entirely wrong to invade the sovereign nation of Ukraine" while also repeating that the West had "provoked" the situation. He said that the enlargement of NATO gave Putin an excuse for invading because he could exploit the situation to tell the Russian people "they're coming for us". Farage was criticised for these statements by Labour and Conservative politicians and was accused of pushing the Kremlin's narrative.

In March 2025, Farage suggested that Volodymyr Zelenskyy, the President of Ukraine bore responsibility for the heated exchanges between himself, J.D. Vance and Donald Trump in the Oval Office regarding discussions on the Russian invasion of Ukraine. However, Farage also said that Trump was giving too much ground to Russia's side on peace negotiations.

Farage has called for a negotiated end to the war in Ukraine and withdrawal of Russian forces, arguing that a Ukrainian military victory is impossible in the long-run and that continued Western aid will only serve to prolong the conflict and civilian deaths. He argued that concessions would be required from both sides and that Western governments should give Ukraine security assurances as part of a peace deal. He has said NATO membership for Ukraine would be "essential" to form a peace agreement and that Ukraine should be allowed to join NATO should the Ukrainian people vote to do so. Farage also distanced himself from early ceasefire proposals from Trump which he judged as too favourable to Putin and argued Ukraine "needs to get proper security guarantees" from the West to ensure an end to hostilities. Farage was also critical of Trump's comments calling Zelenskyy a "dictator" during an interview on GB News, asserting "Zelensky is not a dictator."

In 2025, Farage suggested that the Trump administration could have struck a deal similar to the Gaza peace plan between Ukraine and Russia but argued this was unlikely to happen due to Putin's behaviour. In an interview with Bloomberg News, Farage toughened his position on opposing Russian hostilities against Ukraine by stating he would support sending frozen Russian assets to Ukraine and that Russian fighter planes should be shot down if they intentionally violate NATO airspace. He also said that if were to become Prime Minister, he would support deploying British troops in Ukraine as part of a NATO and United Nations peacekeeping force in the event of a ceasefire with Russia. He later opposed a proposal for a halving of the Ukrainian military in the Trump administration's November 2025 Ukraine peace plan, stating that he was waiting for a Ukrainian counter-proposal. In 2026, he said he would oppose any UK government plans to militarily intervene in the Ukraine war.

=== Scandinavia ===
Farage has collaborated with the Sweden Democrats and the Danish People's Party (DPP) in the European Parliament during his tenure as an MEP. In 2016, he addressed the national conference of the Danish People's Party at the invitation of the then DDP deputy spokesman Søren Espersen in order to advise the DPP on an EU referendum policy.

=== Saudi Arabia ===
Farage has said: "I think we need a complete re-appraisal of who Saudi Arabia are, what our relationship with them is, and stop extremist talk turning the minds of young, male Muslims in this country." In a 2018 interview, Farage criticised the West's reluctance to hold Saudi Arabia accountable for the assassination of Jamal Khashoggi and the kingdom's decades-long propagation of radical Wahhabism, while stressing the importance of British and American economic and security ties to the Kingdom.

=== Turkey ===
In 2016 Farage accused Recep Tayyip Erdoğan's Turkey of "blackmailing" the EU over the European migrant crisis and Turkey's proposed European membership.

=== Canada ===
Farage has cited Canadian conservative politician Preston Manning as a personal influence and has said he aims to replicate the electoral success of Manning's former Reform Party of Canada which replaced the Progressive Conservatives as the largest right-leaning party in Canada. Political journalists in Canada and the UK have drawn parallels between the two leaders and their parties.

=== United States ===
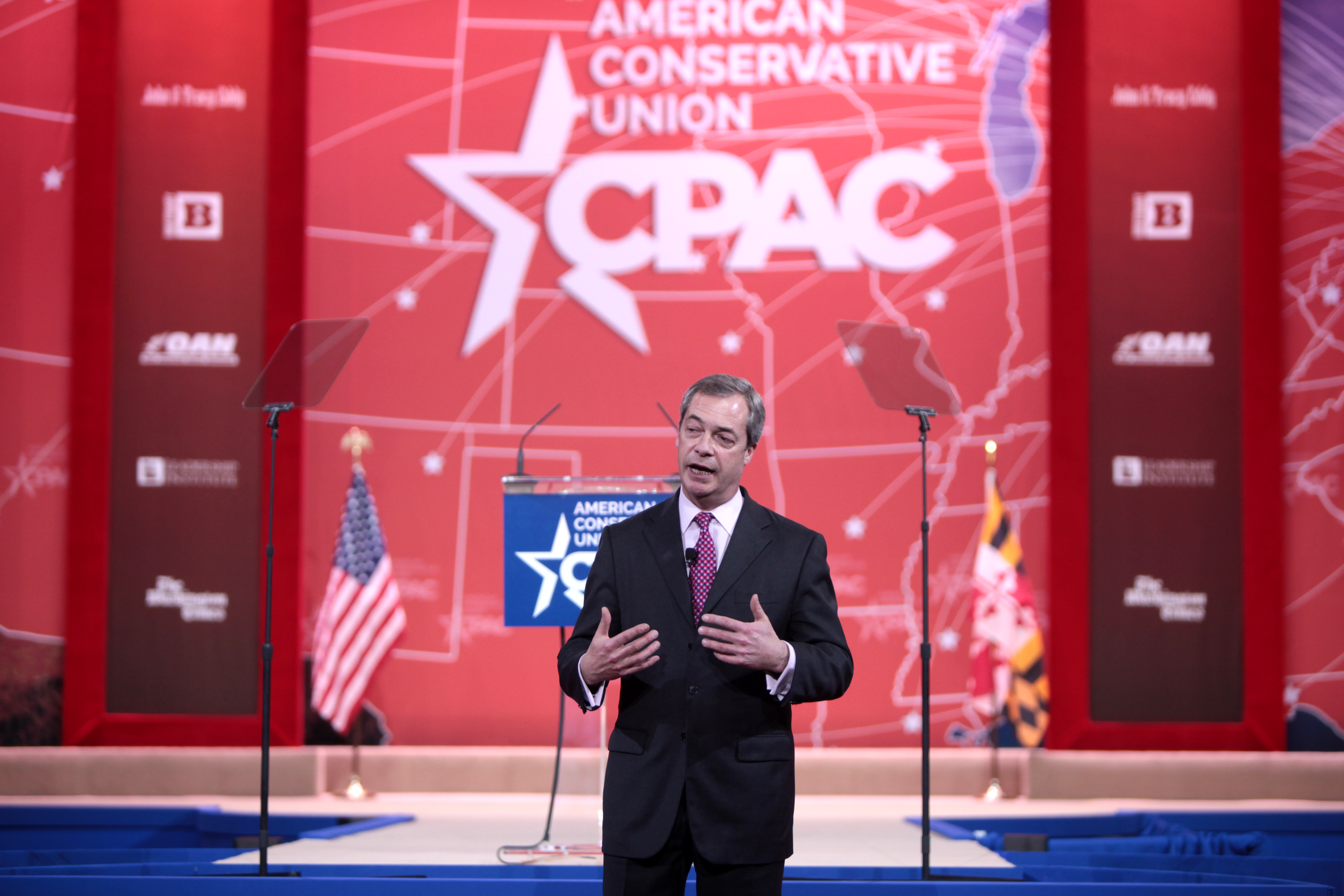
Farage speaking at the 2015 Conservative Political Action Conference in Washington, D.C. about the American elections

In American politics, Farage has typically supported Republican Party candidates and is considered an ally of Donald Trump.

In 2015, Farage compared the Tea Party movement to his then party UKIP, stating that they have their "own share of oddballs and mavericks who sometimes espouse pretty extreme stuff, but they also have truly impressive politicians". He was critical of the religious right, who he believed had "hijacked" the Republican Party, and referred to Sarah Palin as "downright scary".

==== Donald Trump ====
Ahead of the 2016 presidential election, Farage said in a May 2016 interview with Robert Peston that whilst he had reservations on the views and character of 2016 Republican presidential candidate Donald Trump he would vote for Trump if he were a US citizen to prevent Hillary Clinton becoming president. Farage had endorsed Rand Paul prior to Trump's presidential campaign. In July 2016, Farage attended the Republican convention in Cleveland. In August 2016 Farage met Trump for the first time at a campaign fundraiser in Jackson, Mississippi having been invited to the event by staffers for Mississippi governor Phil Bryant while attending the GOP convention. Trump asked Farage to speak at the rally and introduced him to the crowd as "Mr. Brexit".

Farage supported Trump's victory in the 2016 election. He was critical of the outgoing administration of Barack Obama, referring to Obama as "that Obama creature" which caused controversy in the British media and was criticised by British Labour MP John Woodcock. Farage was the first British politician to speak to Trump after his election.

In November 2016, after becoming president-elect, Trump publicly suggested, via Twitter post, that the UK government name Farage as British ambassador to the United States. Trump's expression of a preference for a foreign nation's ambassador was "a startling break with diplomatic protocol" that was unprecedented in recent US history. The then-Foreign Secretary Boris Johnson and the British government rejected the suggestion.

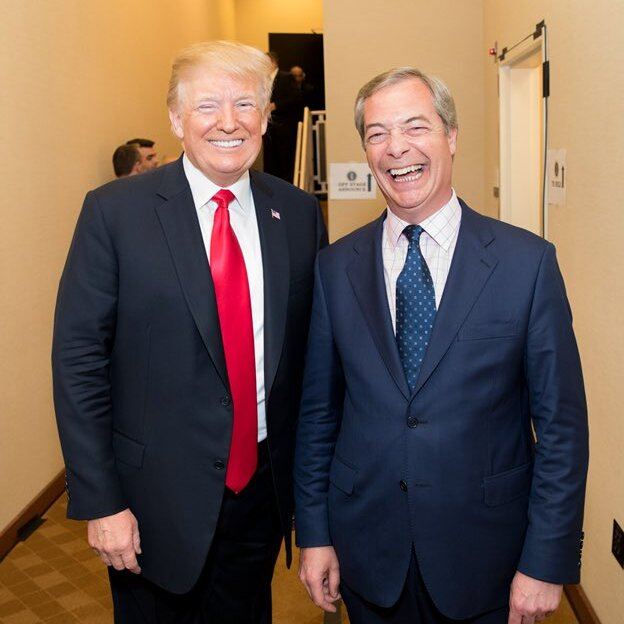
Nigel Farage with US President Donald Trump in 2018

In May 2018 Farage was an advocate for US President Donald Trump to receive the Nobel Peace Prize on the basis of his attempt to bring better diplomatic relations between North Korea and South Korea as well as better diplomatic relations between North Korea and the United States. As a member of the European Parliament at the time, Farage expressed his desire to begin an official petition for Trump to receive the award. Farage endorsed Roy Moore in the United States Senate special election in Alabama. After numerous allegations of sexual misconduct were made against Moore, Farage publicly expressed his scepticism over the allegations. In May 2018, he expressed regret for having backed Moore, stating, "I should have thought about the whole thing far more deeply than I did, and it was a mistake."

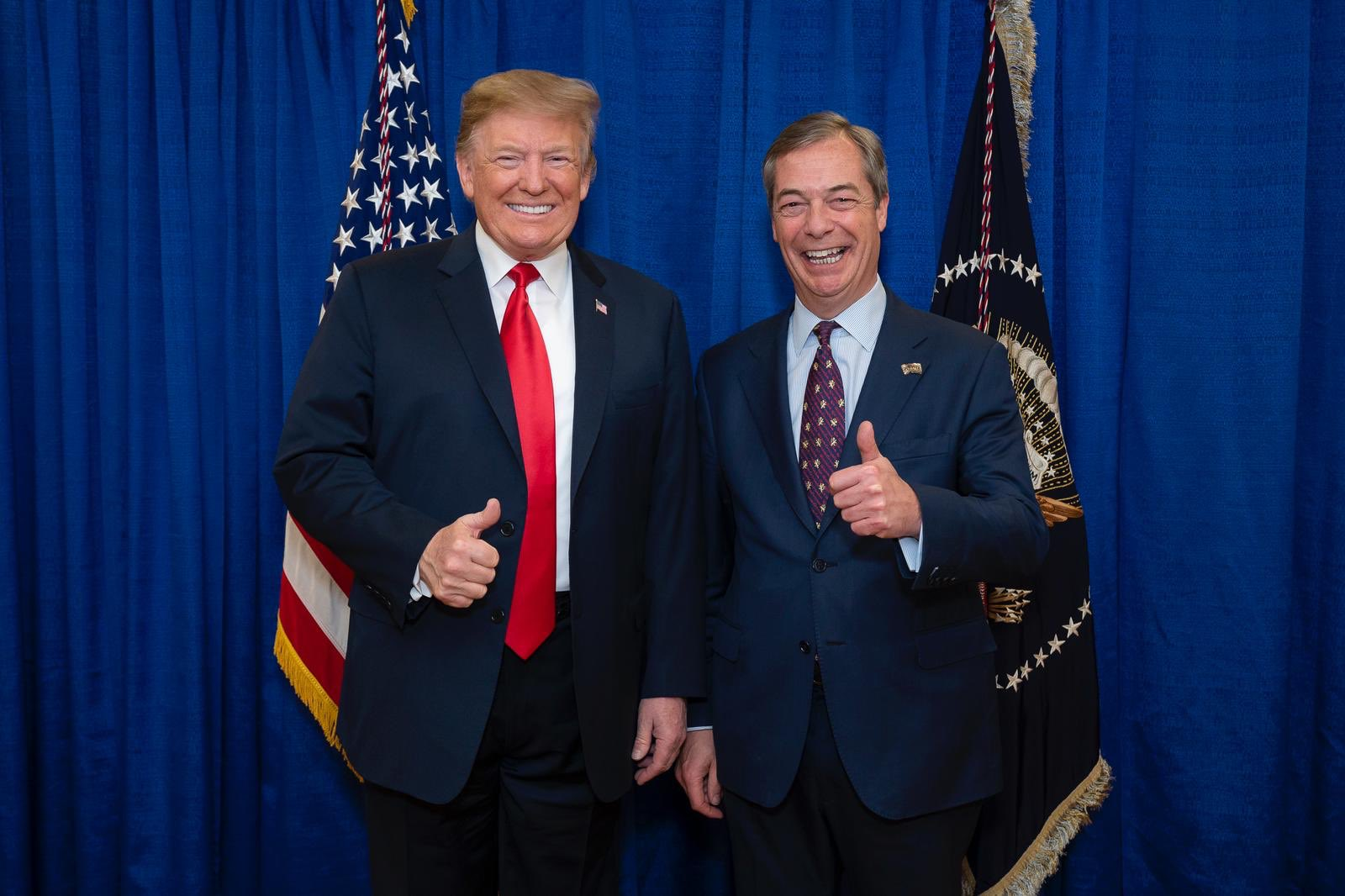
Farage with Trump 2019

In July 2018 Farage headlined a fundraiser for Lou Barletta, the Republican nominee in the 2018 United States Senate election in Pennsylvania.

In 2020, Farage said he would volunteer as a speaker for Trump's 2020 campaign rallies. He was spotted attending Trump rallies in states such as Michigan, Pennsylvania and Arizona.

After the day of the election, Farage conceded that Trump might have lost "fair and square", but said "Donald Trump loses the odd battle, but he doesn't lose wars. He keeps fighting until he wins them". He went on to echo false claims of fraud in the election, saying the election was being stolen through fraudulent mail-in votes and ballot harvesting. Farage condemned the January 6 United States Capitol attack committed by supporters of Trump and wrote on Twitter “Storming Capitol Hill is wrong. The protesters must leave.”

In 2021 Farage undertook a six-week tour of the United States organised by the conservative group FreedomWorks in which he addressed Republican grassroots audiences across the country.

In April 2023, it was reported that Farage highly rated US Republican politician Ron DeSantis and that Farage thought DeSantis had "done a great job in Florida", the state he was governing.

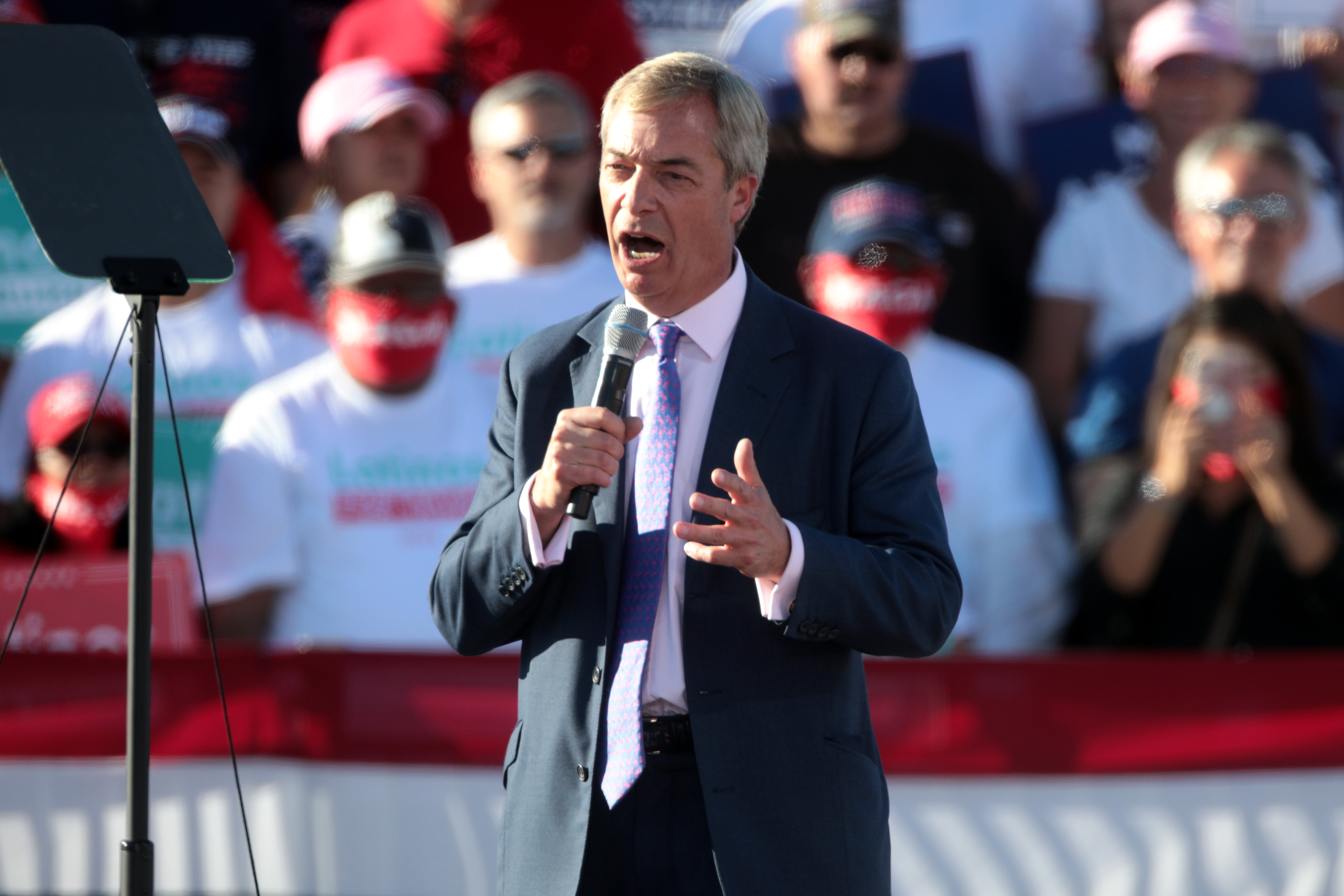
Farage speaking at a Trump rally on 28 October 2020

On 31 May 2024, after Trump was unanimously found guilty by a jury on 34 counts of falsifying business records to commit election fraud, Farage defended him in an interview with Sky News. In May 2024, Farage said that he would not be standing in the 2024 general election and would focus on assisting with Trump's campaigning for the 2024 United States presidential election instead. On 3 June, he reversed this decision, announcing his intention to stand as MP for Clacton as leader of the Reform Party.

Farage in the US city of Milwaukee while attending the 2024 Republican Convention held there during Trump's 2024 campaign

In July 2024, Farage condemned the attempted assassination of Donald Trump.

On 17 December 2024, Farage said the American businessman and political figure Elon Musk was in talks about donating to Reform UK. It was reported the donation could be in the region of $100 million (£78 million). On 5 January 2025, Musk called for Farage to be replaced as leader of Reform UK. Farage suggested that this was due to a disagreement over Musk's support for the far-right activist Tommy Robinson. On 7 January, Farage said that he aimed to "mend fences" with Musk. Farage has frequently described Musk as a "hero".

In April 2025, Farage said that while he supported Trump he personally disagreed with Trump's policies on tariffs and a desire for the U.S. to make Canada its 51st state. Farage said: "I'm a friend of his, and our interests are similar, but they're not symmetrical."

==== Peter Mandelson ====
In late 2024, Farage initially offered a degree of respect for Peter Mandelson's intellectual capabilities. Following Trump's victory in the US presidential election, Farage described Mandelson as a "very intelligent man" and suggested he would be a "good choice for ambassador" to the United States. Despite their fundamental political differences, Farage argued that Mandelson's experience as a former EU trade commissioner would allow him to "command respect" in Washington. He proposed working alongside Mandelson to secure a US–UK trade deal, offering himself as a strategic bridge to the Trump administration.

By early 2026, Farage's tone changed as details emerged regarding Mandelson's relationship with Epstein. Farage branded the resulting fallout the "biggest scandal in British politics for over one century," stating it surpassed historical events like the Profumo affair. He accused Mandelson of "lying" about the extent of his ties to Epstein and suggested he should be investigated for potentially "breaching the Official Secrets Act" regarding the alleged sharing of market-sensitive information. Farage leveraged the controversy to critique Starmer's leadership, describing the decision to involve Mandelson in the administration as a "grave error of judgement" and a "serious misjudgement." He dismissed Starmer's subsequent apologies as "very weak" and "not quite believable," maintaining that the Prime Minister likely ignored multiple warning signs before Mandelson's eventual dismissal.

== Domestic policies ==
=== Firearms ===
In 2014 Farage said that it was UKIP policy for handguns in the UK to be legalised and licensed, describing the current legislation, brought in after the Dunblane school massacre, as "ludicrous". He also said in 2014 that there was no link between responsible handgun ownership and gun crime.

In September 2025, Farage's previous comments in 2014 were referred to by Liberal Democrats leader Ed Davey who accused him of wanting to roll back British gun laws and spark "mass shooting" drills in British schools. Farage responded on LBC by denying these claims. He argued that his quotes had been about shooting ranges and said: "The Olympic team should not have to go to Calais to practice, is what I said… (in) every other country in the world you have secure gun clubs where people can shoot." The Independent newspaper noted in 2025 that Farage had not expressed any policies on gun ownership as Reform UK leader.

=== Death penalty ===
Farage said in 2014 that he was opposed to the death penalty.

=== Abortion ===
In November 2024, Farage said that the UK Parliament should debate imposing stricter limits on abortion. Farage was a speaker at the 2024 National Conservatism Conference (NatCon), which was backed by ADF International (UK), an anti-abortion organisation. He was paid £13,000 to give a speech at the Keep Arizona Free Summit on a 2024 visit to the USA. Farage described UK abortion buffer zones as a "crackdown on free expression" which was "becoming very sinister". According to The Observer he reportedly told "a room full of abortion abolitionists, extreme faith groups and alt-right groups" that they were "saving Western civilisation". In May 2025, Farage described himself as "pro-choice" on the matter of abortion but conversely said it was "utterly ludicrous" for abortion to be allowed up to 24 weeks.

In October 2025, it was announced that the British academic and anti-abortion activist James Orr had been appointed as a senior advisor to Farage.

=== LGBT issues ===
When asked on LBC in 2014, after same-sex marriage was legalised in England and Wales, whether he supported gay marriage, he answered that he supported civil partnerships for gay couples but did "not support the idea of same-sex marriages, all the while we're under the auspices of the European Court of Human Rights". He added that he would not campaign to abolish same-sex marriage. In 2025, Farage reaffirmed his beliefs that although he thought it was "wrong" to introduce marriage equality, he thought it was a "settled issue" he would not seek to overturn and argued same-sex marriage is now British law.

When questioned by a transgender caller during a 2024 phone-in discussion on BBC Radio 5 about his views on trans rights, Farage said he believed in transgender rights but added that the rights of women to single-sex spaces should be "respected" and that individuals who have gone through male puberty should not compete in women's sports.

Farage has said that Margaret Thatcher's time as Prime Minister of the United Kingdom "was one I think of real advancement for gay people in society." According to PinkNews, Farage has defended past comments made by Boris Johnson in which he referred to gay people as "tank-topped bum boys". After Ann Widdecombe drew criticism for endorsing conversion therapy and that science might produce a way to change a person's sexuality in the future, Farage defended her, saying her views on homosexuality were a "matter of conscience" and criticised those who condemned her remarks as having "hounded" her.

In August 2025, Reform UK announced Vanessa Frake, a former prison governor, would be their new justice adviser. Shortly afterwards, she said there should not be a blanket ban on transgender women being sent to women's prisons and that they should be assessed on a case-by-case basis. Farage initially supported Frake over her stance on the issue. However, the next day, after it became controversial among party members and faced criticism, including from J.K. Rowling, he said he had "never supported men in women's prisons". Subsequently, it was reported that Reform UK members would hold a vote to call for transgender women to be excluded from female prisons at their upcoming party conference.

In September 2025, Labour MP Nadia Whittome accused Farage of "vile homophobia" after he said "the most stable relationships tend to be between men and women". The statements were made when, during a press conference over the formerly Conservative MP Danny Kruger joining Reform, Farage was asked about past comments on the subject made by Kruger, who had told a National Conservatism Conference that marriage between men and women was "the only basis for a safe and successful society".

=== Antisemitism ===
In 2014, Farage said that Muslim immigrants to the UK and Europe have caused a rise in antisemitism. In February 2025, during his show on GB News, Farage made comments about the former Labour Party leader Jeremy Corbyn in which he suggested Corbyn promoted antisemitic conspiracy theories. Corbyn subsequently said Farage's comments had been "defamatory" claims that he believed in "an antisemitic conspiracy theory". He initiated legal action against Farage, who said he stood by his comments. Farage has been accused of using antisemitic tropes when describing George Soros, Grant Shapps, and the "Jewish lobby".

In 2019, the Board of Deputies of British Jews and Muslim Council of Britain criticised Farage following an investigation by The Guardian for engaging in interviews with Alex Jones on InfoWars in 2009 and 2018 that included phrases and themes common in antisemitic conspiracy theories such as "globalists" and "new world order." Farage later rejected the accusations.

In June 2020, Farage promoted the Cultural Marxism conspiracy theory, for which he has been condemned by Jewish groups, such as the Board of Deputies of British Jews, as well as a number of Members of Parliament, who said he used it as a dog-whistle code for antisemitism. Farage said that the United Kingdom faced "Cultural Marxism", a term described in its report by The Guardian as "originating in a conspiracy theory based on a supposed plot against national governments, which is closely linked to the far right and antisemitism." Farage's spokesman "condemned previous criticism of his language by Jewish groups and others as 'pathetic' and 'a manufactured story.'"

In March 2024, Farage said that Britain's foreign policy, public services and the education system held political biases against Israel and Jews during a discussion of GB News and accused British police forces of "two-tier" policing by tolerating antisemitic rhetoric at pro-Palestine demonstrations. In September 2025, Farage attended a march against antisemitism in London. In September 2025, Zia Yusuf's X account liked an antisemitic post about Robert Jenrick's wife and children, who are Jewish. Farage responded to calls to sack Yusuf by declining them. He stated the incident was "one little mistake" and said a member of Yusuf's team had liked the post.

=== Tommy Robinson ===
In December 2018, Farage distanced himself from anti-Islam campaigner Tommy Robinson and subsequently resigned from UKIP after the party's leader Gerard Batten appointed Robinson as an advisor. In January 2025, Farage said he would not support Robinson joining Reform UK.

Following the Unite the Kingdom rally organised by Robinson on 13 September 2025 as part of the ongoing 2025 British anti-immigration protests, Farage criticised violence against police officers by attendees at the rally as "horrible" whilst also stating "the vast majority who caught the train to London for the day were good, ordinary, decent people."

=== Anti-immigration protests ===
Farage expressed support for the 2025 British anti-immigration protests, arguing that protests against migrant hotels were needed to "put pressure on local councils to go to court" to try to block other hotels from housing asylum seekers. Farage also supported the Operation Raise the Colours campaign.

=== Face veil ban ===
In November 2013, Farage said he supported banning the face veil in schools, airports and banks. Previously, in 2010, Farage called for a ban in public places and public buildings similar to the French and Belgian bans.

=== Muslim Brotherhood ===
In 2025, Farage called for the Muslim Brotherhood to be banned in the United Kingdom and said a Reform UK government would proscribe it as a terrorist group.

=== Rights for men and women ===
In January 2018, Farage, who said he believes in equal rights for men and women, also said that he thinks men find it difficult to identify as feminists because it is awkward, as part of his explanation for why he does not identify as a feminist. In June 2024, he said the misogynist influencer Andrew Tate was an "important voice" for young men, while also stating that Tate had gone "over the top" and that he had said some "pretty horrible" things.

=== Grooming gangs ===
On 8 January 2025, Farage voted along with all other Reform UK MPs for a new national inquiry into rape gangs. The bill was lost by 364 votes to 111, a majority of 253 against the amendment.

In August 2025, Farage stated that Reform UK would launch and fund their own independent inquiry into the grooming gang scandals and described them as racist attacks against white children by Pakistani rapists. Farage also criticised the Conservative Party for not fully launching a national inquiry during their time in power and said: "The establishment has failed the victims of grooming gangs on every level."

=== Online Safety Act ===
Farage is one of the bill's most vocal opponents, has called the act "borderline dystopian" and said he would repeal it if elected to government. Fellow Reform leader Zia Yusuf described the legislation as "an assault on freedom". Then Science Secretary Peter Kyle responded to the comments made by Farage by stating that Farage was "on the side of sex offenders like Jimmy Savile". When Farage requested an apology, Kyle reiterated his position and stated that, "If you want to overturn the Online Safety Act you are on the side of predators. It is as simple as that." This stance was widely derided online, and received criticism from U.S. politicians and technology entrepreneurs.

=== Assisted dying ===
On 20 June 2025, Farage voted "No" to the Terminally Ill Adults (End of Life) Bill.

=== Unions ===
Farage has accused teaching unions of "poisoning the minds of young people". In 2015 he complained about being targeted by some trade union-funded activists. UKIP sent a spy that year to obtain information on one of these groups. Protesters said the spy encouraged activists to deface posters, heckle meetings, behave badly, abuse Farage, as well as commit other criminal acts in an attempt to discredit the group in the public eye.

=== Thatcherism ===
In 2013, Farage referred to Margaret Thatcher as a "great patriotic lady" and said that he was the only politician "keeping the flame of Thatcherism alive". In 2014 he said that UKIP was not a "new Thatcherite party", stating: "Thatcherism was of its time, 40 years ago, to deal with a specific set of problems. For half the country it benefited them, for the other half it didn't."
