= Cham Faraj =

Cham Faraj چم فرج
- Village
- Location within Iran
- Coordinates: 31°47′12″N 49°01′21″E
- Country: Iran
- Province: Khuzestan
- County: Shushtar
- Bakhsh: Central
- Rural District: Shahid Modarres

Population (2006)
  - Total: 131
- Time zone: UTC+3:30 (IRST)
  - Summer (DST): UTC+4:30 (IRDT)

Cham Faraj (Persian: چم فرج; also known as Cham Faraj-e Yek) is a village in Shahid Modarres Rural District, in the Central District of Shushtar County, Khuzestan Province, Iran. At the 2006 census, its population was 131, in 28 families.
