= Mirza Faraj Rzayev =

Mirza Faraj Rzayev Mirzə Fərəc Rzayev
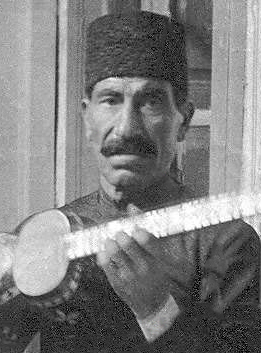

Background information
- Born: March 15, 1847; Baku, Baku Uyezd, Shamakhi Governorate, Russian Empire
- Died: March 27, 1927 (aged 80) Baku, Baku Uyezd, Azerbaijan SSR, TSFSR, USSR
- Genres: mugham
- Instrument: tar

Mirza Faraj Rza oghlu Rzayev (Azerbaijani: Mirzə Fərəc Rza oğlu Rzayev, March 15, 1847 — March 27, 1927) was an Azerbaijani musician, tar player.

== Biography ==
Mirza Faraj was born on March 15, 1847, in Baku. He played tar in drama and later opera performances in Baku since 1886, and accompanied Jabbar Garyaghdioglu, Kechachioghlu Muhammed and other singers in "Oriental Nights" and "Oriental Concerts". After the establishment of the Azerbaijan SSR, he taught mugam at the People's Conservatory (1920) and Music College (1922-1926), and organized a tar club (1923) under the Workers' Club in Baku. In 1925, under the leadership of Uzeyir Hajibeyov, Mirza Faraj participated in the development of the first curriculum for teaching mugam and became a member of the "Mugam Commission".

M. Faraj died on March 27, 1927, in Baku.
