= We Are All Made of Glue =

2009 novel by Marina Lewycka

- First paperback edition cover
- Author: Marina Lewycka
- Language: English
- Genre: Comedy novel
- Publication date: 2 July 2009
- Publication place: United Kingdom
- Media type: Print (hardback & paperback)
- ISBN: 978-1-905490-22-6 (first edition, hardback)

We Are All Made of Glue is English novelist Marina Lewycka's third novel, published in 2009. The book follows the friendship of Georgina, a recently separated middle-aged freelance journalist and Mrs Shapiro, an elderly lady who lives with seven cats in a dilapidated North London mansion.

== Plot summary ==
Georgina Sinclair is a freelance journalist, who makes a living contributing to trade magazines. Her main work is with the journal "Adhesives in the Modern World", which features articles about Epoxy resins and other aspects of gluing. After her lawyer husband Euripides "Rip" Sinclair walks out of the marriage, Georgina finds herself involved with elderly neighbor Mrs Shapiro, a 92-year-old Jewish emigre, who lives in a smelly and decrepit North London mansion. The house is a desirable property, and secondary characters including social workers and real estate agents seek to gain its sale for their own profit. Amidst the dark humour about aging and loneliness, serious issues about the Holocaust and the displacement of Palestinians are raised.

== Critical reception ==
We Are All Made of Glue was described as an "uneasy mix" of suburban themes and politics. The "glue" conceit was criticised as somewhat glib and flippant in light of the political matters raised in the novel.
