= Mustafa Faraj =

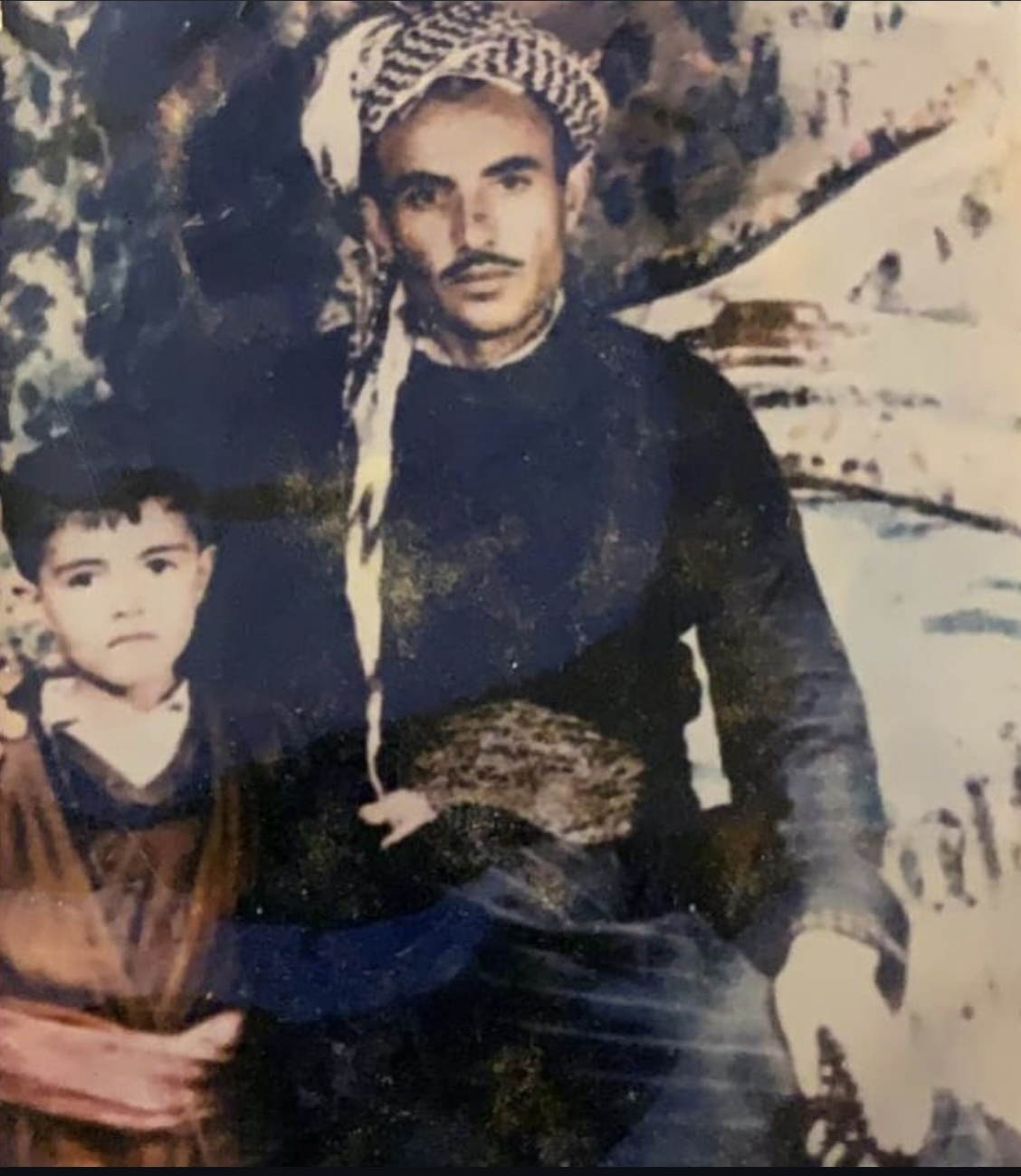
- Born: 1935; Baneh, Iran
- Died: June 1974 (aged 38–39); Kirkuk Governorate, Iraq

Mustafa Faraj (born 1935 in Baneh, Eastern Kurdistan – died 1974) was a Kurdish general and a prominent figure within the Peshmerga during the armed resistance against the Iraqi government. He played a vital role in the Kurdish struggle for autonomy in northern Iraq.

Mustafa Faraj was born in Baneh in 1935, his ancestral roots lay in Sanandaj, where his family originated generations prior. His mother died during his early childhood. After her death, his father remarried and did not take care of him. Consequently, Mustafa Faraj was raised by his aunt in the plains of Shahrizor, Iraq. He later lived for extended periods in both Chamchamal and Kirkuk.

He began his career in the local police force in Mosul, where he was promoted to a senior rank. In the early 1960s, after hearing a radio message from Mustafa Barzani calling for the creation of a free Kurdistan, Mustafa Faraj made the decisive choice to join the Kurdish resistance. One night, he disarmed his own police unit and took twenty police officers hostage. He transported them—along with their weapons—to Barzani’s forces, where they were handed over as prisoners of war. This marked the start of his active role in the Peshmerga.

Mustafa Faraj rose to the rank of general and commanded around 500 fighters directly. In larger operations, he led forces of up to 2,000 men. He fought primarily in the Kirkuk region, playing a leading role in several major battles against the Iraqi Armed Forces.

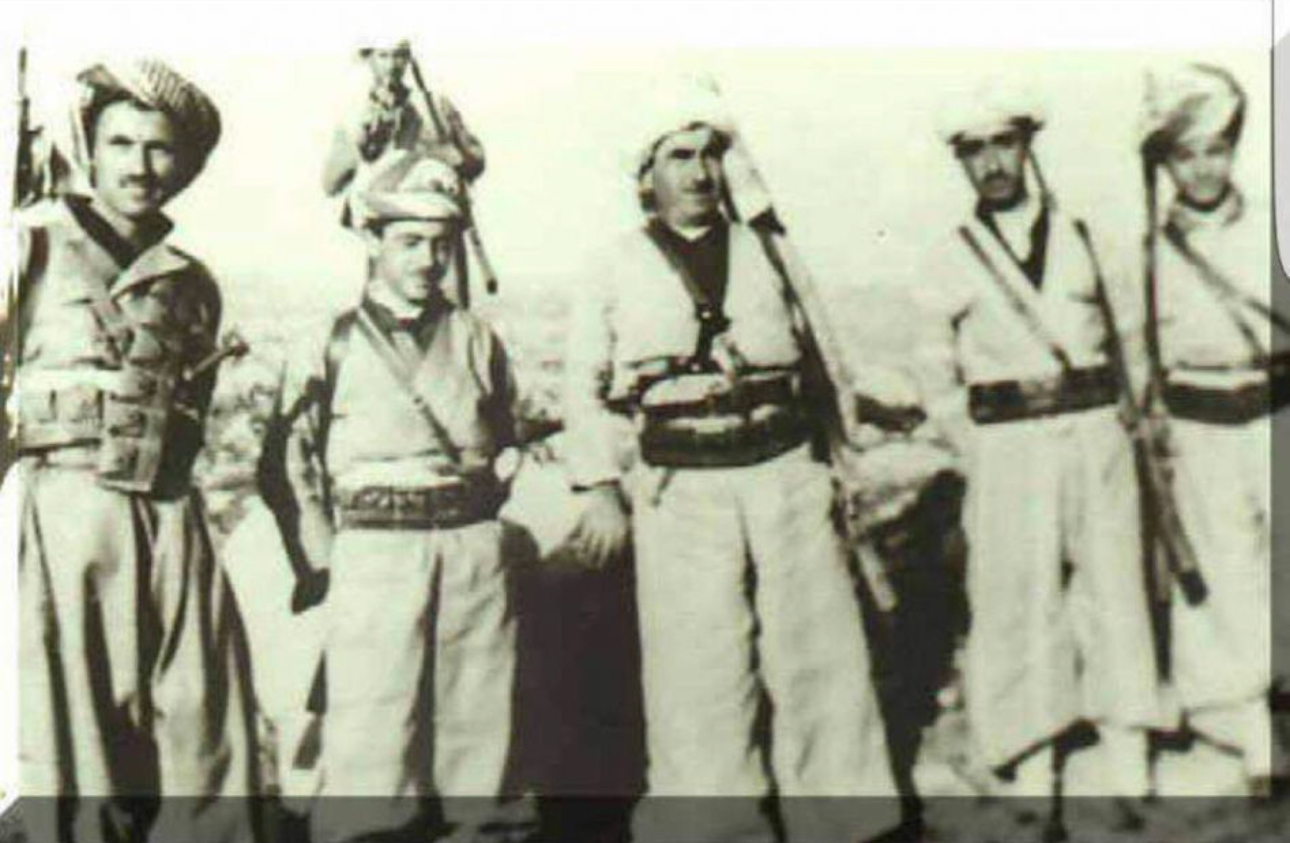
Mustafa Faraj - Idris Barzani - Mustafa Barzani - unknown - Masoud Barzani

Due to increasing persecution by the Ba’ath regime, Mustafa Faraj was forced to go into hiding on several occasions. He spent a period living in a mountain cave to avoid capture by government forces.

Throughout his military career, Mustafa Faraj was wounded multiple times. As he could not safely seek medical care in Iraq, he received several surgeries and treatments in Iran, particularly in Tehran.

In the early 1970s, when Dr. Kemal Karkuki and his Peshmerga unit were imprisoned in Baghdad, Mustafa Faraj captured a high-ranking Iraqi officer and successfully negotiated a prisoner exchange that secured their release.

In 1974, Mustafa Faraj was killed during combat between the Peshmerga and the Iraqi Armed Forces. After his death, the Ba’ath regime tied his body to a tank and dragged it through the streets of Kirkuk as a public warning, to demonstrate that high-ranking Peshmerga could be eliminated.

Mustafa Faraj had six children:

- Sabria Mustafa Faraj
- Aram Salah Mustafa Faraj
- Layla Mustafa Faraj
- Mina Mustafa Faraj
- Mohammed Mustafa Faraj
- Nahla Mustafa Faraj

His son, Aram Salah Mustafa Faraj, led the Kurdish uprising (’’Raparin’’) in Chamchamal. He was killed by unknown Kurdish men in Qara Hanjir, between Kirkuk and Sulaymaniyah. Another son, Mohammed Mustafa Faraj, remains active in the Peshmerga and fought on the frontlines against ISIS in the Makhmur District, between the Erbil Governorate and Nineveh Governorate, Iraq.
