= Hamdi Faraj Fanoush =

Libyan judge and diplomat

Hamdi Faraj Fanoush is a judge from the Libyan Jamahiriya and served as a judge of the African Court on Human and Peoples' Rights from 2006 to 2010. He was appointed to the court in January 2006. He has also served as the Chief Justice of the Libyan Court of Appeal in Tripoli.

From 1984 to 1997, he was Libya's ambassador to Cameroon.
