= Faraj Alahi =

Faraj Alahi (Farajollahi) فرج الهي
- Village
- Location within Iran
- Coordinates: 33°47′47″N 48°14′42″E
- Country: Iran
- Province: Lorestan
- County: Selseleh
- Bakhsh: Central
- Rural District: Honam

Population (2006)
  - Total: 61
- Time zone: UTC+3:30 (IRST)
  - Summer (DST): UTC+4:30 (IRDT)

Faraj Alahi (Persian: فرج الهی; also spelled and read Farajollahi; also romanized as Faraj Alahī) is a village in Honam Rural District, in the Central District of Selseleh County, Lorestan Province, Iran. At the 2006 census, its population was 61, in 13 families.
