= Faraj Al-Mass =

Qatari footballer (born 1961)

Faraj Abbas
Personal information
- Full name: Faraj Abbas Al-Mass
- Date of birth: 1961 (age 64–65)
- Place of birth: Doha, Qatar
- Height: 1.71 m (5 ft 7 in)

Senior career*
Years	Team	Apps	(Gls)
- Al Ahli

International career
- Qatar
- * Club domestic league appearances and goals

Faraj Abbas Al-Mass (Arabic:فرج عباس الماس; born 1961) is a Qatari footballer. He competed in the men's tournament at the 1984 Summer Olympics.
