= Gol Faraj =

Gol Faraj گل فرج
- Village
- Location within Iran
- Coordinates: 38°53′12″N 45°28′58″E
- Country: Iran
- Province: East Azerbaijan
- County: Jolfa
- Bakhsh: Central
- Rural District: Shoja

Population (2006)
  - Total: 83
- Time zone: UTC+3:30 (IRST)
  - Summer (DST): UTC+4:30 (IRDT)

Gol Faraj (Persian: گل فرج; also known as Gulfaraj and Kal Faraj) is a village in Shoja Rural District, in the Central District of Jolfa County, East Azerbaijan Province, Iran. At the 2006 census, its population was 83, in 21 families.
