= Abdullah Faraj =

Emirati footballer (born 1986)

Personal information
- Full name: Abdullah Faraj Marzouq Al-Nuaimi
- Date of birth: 27 September 1986 (age 40)
- Place of birth: United Arab Emirates
- Height: 1.78 m (5 ft 10 in)
- Position: Right-back

Youth career
- Al Jazira

Senior career*
Years	Team	Apps	(Gls)
2007–2009	Al Jazira		
2009–2010	Al Dhafra		
2010–2011	Al Ittihad		
2011–2012	Emirates		
2012–2013	Al Ittihad		
2013–2016	Al Shabab		
2016	Al Dhafra		
2016–2018	Al-Fujairah		
2018–2019	Al-Dhaid		
2019–2020	Al Bataeh		
- * Club domestic league appearances and goals

Abdullah Faraj (Arabic:عبد الله فرج) (born 27 September 1986) is an Emirati footballer.
