= A Short History of Tractors in Ukrainian =

2005 humorous novel by Marina Lewycka

- First edition cover
- Author: Marina Lewycka
- Language: English
- Genre: Comedy novel
- Publisher: Viking Press
- Publication date: 31 March 2005
- Publication place: United Kingdom
- Media type: Print (Hardback& Paperback)
- Pages: 336 pp (first edition, hardback)
- ISBN: 0-670-91560-2 (first edition, hardback)
- OCLC: 57382192

A Short History of Tractors in Ukrainian is a humorous novel by British writer Marina Lewycka, first published in 2005 by Viking (Penguin Books).

The novel won the Bollinger Everyman Wodehouse Prize at the Hay literary festival, the Waverton Good Read Award 2005/6, and was short-listed for the 2005 Orange Prize for Fiction, losing to Lionel Shriver's We Need to Talk About Kevin. More than a million copies have been sold in the UK.

The book was originally published in English, and has been translated into Russian and Ukrainian. In a BBC Bookclub interview, the author mentioned that some reviewers of the Ukrainian translation were hostile, seeing it as an attack on their country.

== Plot ==
The novel describes the reactions of two daughters when their widowed, 84-year-old father Nikolai marries a highly sexual and much younger Ukrainian immigrant, Valentina. Concerned about Valentina's motives, Nadezhda and Vera are drawn back into contact with each other after a long period of estrangement. They find themselves united against a common enemy in Valentina, whose grasping, manipulative behaviour escalates until the daughters finally succeed in obtaining a divorce for their father.

Nikolai, a former engineer who emigrated to Britain in the aftermath of the Second World War, is writing a history of tractors in Ukrainian, translated extracts from which appear throughout the novel. In the process of sorting out Nikolai's marital entanglements,

The action takes place in Peterborough, England, and is narrated by the youngest daughter, Nadezhda, a university lecturer in Sociology.

== Reception ==
The Ukrainian novelist Andrey Kurkov, reviewing the book in The Guardian, calls the book a "banal tale" that will not teach the reader anything about the Ukrainian community in England. He states that the "rhythm and dynamics of this debut novel are well managed", and that Lewycka is successful in setting up "many comic situations", but finds the characters, such as Valentina with her "enormous breasts" and liking for green satin underwear, "caricatures" and the novel "constructed".

The Polish translator and travel writer Magda Healey, reviewing the book for Bookbag, thought it "eminently readable, well flowing and colourful", though it showed a common fault of autobiographical debut novels, with too much content crammed in, the stories often not thoroughly explored. All the same, it had moving moments, some poetically beautiful passages, and "wonderfully absurd" scenes of farce. She found the sections of the engineer Nikolai's monumental history of tractors "a nice device". It was undemanding "but not totally shallow".
