= Dog whistle (politics) =

Political messaging using coded language

In politics, a dog whistle is the use of coded or suggestive language in political messaging to garner support from a particular group without provoking opposition. Dog whistles use language that appears normal to the majority but communicates specific things to intended audiences.

== Origin and meaning ==
Dogs are sensitive to high frequencies which are inaudible to the human ear. Merriam-Webster states that the figurative meaning of the term dog whistle is of recent origin while its literal usage dates back more than 200 years.

According to William Safire, the term dog whistle in reference to politics may have been derived from its use in the field of opinion polling. Safire quotes Richard Morin, director of polling for The Washington Post, as writing in 1988:

subtle changes in question-wording sometimes produce remarkably different results ... researchers call this the "Dog Whistle Effect": Respondents hear something in the question that researchers do not.

He speculates that campaign workers adapted the phrase from political pollsters.

In her 2006 book Voting for Jesus: Christianity and Politics in Australia, academic Amanda Lohrey writes that the goal of the dog-whistle is to appeal to the greatest possible number of electors while alienating the smallest possible number. She uses as an example politicians choosing broadly appealing words such as "family values", which have extra resonance for Christians, while avoiding overt Christian moralizing that might be a turn-off for non-Christian voters.

Australian political theorist Robert E. Goodin argues that the problem with dog-whistling is that it undermines democracy, because if voters have different understandings of what they were supporting during a campaign, the fact that they were seeming to support the same thing is "democratically meaningless" and does not give the dog-whistler a policy mandate.

== History and usage ==
=== Australia ===
The term was first picked up in Australian politics in the mid-1990s, and was frequently applied to the political campaigning of John Howard. Throughout his 11 years as Australian prime minister and particularly in his fourth term, Howard was accused of communicating messages appealing to anxious Australian voters using code words such as "un-Australian", "mainstream", and "illegals".

One notable example was the Howard government's message on refugee arrivals. His government's tough stance on immigration was popular with voters, but was accused of using the issue to additionally send veiled messages of support to voters with racist leanings, while maintaining plausible deniability by avoiding overtly racist language. Another example was the publicity of the Australian citizenship test in 2007. It has been argued that the test may appear reasonable at face value, but is really intended to appeal to those opposing immigration from particular geographic regions.

Sociologist Barry Hindess has criticized Josh Fear's and Robert E. Goodin's respective attempts to theorize dog-whistles on the grounds that they did not pass the Weberian test of value neutrality: "In the case of the concept of ‘dog-whistle politics,' we find that the investigator's—in this case, Fear's—disapproval enters into the definition of the object of study. Goodin avoids this problem, clearly signalling his disapproval—for example, with his ‘particularly pernicious' (2008, p. 224)—but not letting it interfere with his own conceptualisation of the phenomenon. The difficulty here is that this abstinence leaves him with no real distinction between the general phenomena of coded messaging […] and dog whistling in particular, leaving us to suspect that dog whistling should be seen not so much as a novel form of rhetoric, but rather, to borrow an image from Thomas Hobbes' Leviathan, as a familiar form misliked."

Philosopher Carlos Santana corroborates Hindess' criticism of the dog-whistle notion as being dependent on the investigator's social and moral values during his own attempted definition, writing: "We don't want every instance of bi-level meaning in political discourse to count as dog whistles, because not every instance of political doublespeak is problematic in the way prototypical dog whistles like welfare queen and family values are. Some, like backhanded compliments to political rivals, aren't a major source of social ills. Some, like aspirational hypocrisy (Quill 2010) and deliberate doublespeak meant to bring diverse constituencies together (Maloyed 2011), might even be socially beneficial. Keep in mind what makes dog whistles problematic: they harm disadvantaged groups, undermine our ability to have a functioning plural society, and muddle our ability to reliably hold political figures responsible for their actions. Given our interest in addressing these harms, it makes sense to limit our definition of dog whistles to the types of bi-level meaning which engender them."

=== Austria ===
In 1938, Austria was annexed by Nazi Germany. The history of Austria being controlled by Germany during the time of World War 2 has left reminisce of Nazi dog whistles used in present day Austria. These dog whistles are surrounding antisemitism which include symbols like the cornflower.

Austrian right-wing parties use dog whistles to target migrants and speak out against immigration; these dog whistles include "remigration" and "homogeneity" to signal to wanting less diversity and immigration in Austria.

=== Canada ===
During the 2015 Canadian federal election, the Canadian Broadcasting Corporation (CBC) reported on a controversy involving the Conservative party leader, incumbent Prime Minister Stephen Harper, using the phrase "old-stock Canadians" in a debate, apparently to appeal to his party's base supporters. Commentators, including pollster Frank Graves and former Quebec Liberal MP Marlene Jennings, saw this as a codeword historically used against non-white immigrants.

Midway through the election campaign, the Conservative Party had hired Australian political strategist Lynton Crosby as a political adviser when they fell to third place in the polls - behind the Liberal Party and the New Democratic Party. On 17 September 2015, during a televised election debate, Stephen Harper, while discussing the government's controversial decision to remove certain immigrants and refugee claimants from accessing Canada's health care system, made reference to "Old Stock Canadians" as being in support of the government's position. Marlene Jennings called his words racist and divisive, as they are used to exclude Canadians of colour.

Psychologist Steven Pinker has remarked that the concept of dog whistling allows people to "claim that anyone says anything because you can easily hear the alleged dogwhistles that aren't in the actual literal contents of what the person says".

=== France ===
A dog whistle used in France is "ensauvagement", which is used to suggest someone or an institution is becoming savage.

=== Ireland ===
In late 2025, Tánaiste Simon Harris of Ireland commented on an ongoing problem of homelessness related to immigration. In an interview with The Irish Times Simon Harris provided what can be regarded as a dog-whistle with claims that a “significant number” of people simply “don’t have a housing right in Ireland”.

=== Hungary ===
In Hungary the main dog whistles heard and used are surrounding non-Christian religions and cultures, mostly tracing back to the time led up to World War 2 with Nazi propaganda. Many antisemitic dog whistles used to attack people in Hungary are “Judeo-Bolshevism” and “de-Christianise,” these are used because of the large Christian values demonstrated in the country. Dog whistles also target Muslims, specifically those who are Muslim refugees using word like “Islamise,” which implies that the refugees are trying to convert everyone to Islam.

=== Indonesia ===
Darmawan Prasodjo notes the use of the concept of "strong leadership" as a dog whistle in the context of Indonesian politics.

=== Israeli–Palestinian conflict ===
The popular Palestinian nationalist and anti-Zionist slogan "from the river to the sea" has been called a dog-whistle for the complete destruction of Israel by Charles C. W. Cooke and Seth Mandel. Pat Fallon called its usage "a thinly veiled call for the genocide of millions of Jews in Israel," and the Anti-Defamation League notes that, "It is an antisemitic charge denying the Jewish right to self-determination, including through the removal of Jews from their ancestral homeland".

According to United States Congresswoman Rashida Tlaib, the sole Palestinian-American representative in Congress, the slogan is "an aspirational call for freedom, human rights and peaceful coexistence, not death, destruction, or hate." According to Maha Nassar, Associate Professor in the School of Middle Eastern and North African Studies, University of Arizona, "the majority of Palestinians who use this phrase do so because they believe that, in 10 short words, it sums up their personal ties, their national rights and their vision for the land they call Palestine. And while attempts to police the slogan's use may come from a place of genuine concern, there is a risk that tarring the slogan as antisemitic – and therefore beyond the pale – taps into a longer history of attempts to silence Palestinian voices." In an interview with Al Jazeera, Nimer Sultany, a lecturer in law at the School of Oriental and African Studies (SOAS) in London, said the adjective expresses "the need for equality for all inhabitants of historic Palestine".

From a historical perspective and the perspective of Palestinians, the full slogan has had several variations:

1. min an-nahr ʾilā l-baḥr / Filasṭīn sa-tataḥarrar (من النهر إلى البحر / فلسطين ستتحرر, "from the river to the sea / Palestine will be free")
2. min il-ṃayye la-l-ṃayye / Falasṭīn ʿarabiyye (من المية للمية / فلسطين عربية, "from the water to the water / Palestine is Arab")
3. min il-ṃayye la-l-ṃayye / Falasṭīn ʾislāmiyye (من المية للمية / فلسطين إسلامية, "from the water to the water / Palestine is Islamic")

=== Italy ===
Roberto Saviano of The Guardian claimed that Italian right-wing politician Giorgia Meloni used the Mussolini-era slogan "God, homeland, family" as a dog-whistle to signal her anti-immigration stance. In 2019, she used her identity as a dog whistle, proclaiming at a rally: "I am Giorgia, I am a woman, I am a mother, I am Italian, I am a Christian." Washington Post columnist Philip Bump contended that Meloni has used the term "financial speculators" as a dog-whistle to conceal antisemitism.

=== United Kingdom ===
Lynton Crosby, who had previously managed John Howard's four election campaigns in Australia, worked as a Conservative Party adviser during the 2005 UK general election, and the term was introduced to British political discussion at this time. In what Goodin calls "the classic case" of dog-whistling, Crosby created a campaign for the Conservatives with the slogan "Are you thinking what we're thinking?": a series of posters, billboards, TV commercials and direct mail pieces with messages like "It's not racist to impose limits on immigration" and "how would you feel if a bloke on early release attacked your daughter?" focused on controversial issues like insanitary hospitals, land grabs by squatters and restraints on police behaviour.

During the EU Referendum, the Leave campaign was accused by members of the Remain campaign such as Labour MP Yvette Cooper and Green MP Caroline Lucas of stirring up racial hatred against Eastern Europeans and ethnic minorities through anti-immigration dog whistles. Vote Leave distanced itself from Leave.EU and UKIP after the Breaking Point poster, showing predominantly Syrian and Afghan refugees near the Croatia-Slovenia border with the sole white person in the image being obscured by text. Boris Johnson stated it was "not our campaign" and "not my politics".

During the 2024 General Election, Reform UK was accused of racist dog whistling when leader Nigel Farage stated that then Prime Minister Rishi Sunak, who is of Indian descent, "doesn't understand our culture" and "is not patriotic" after leaving commemorations for the 80th anniversary of D-Day early.

=== United States ===
==== 20th century ====
The phrase "states' rights", literally referring to powers of individual state governments in the United States, was described in 2007 by journalist David Greenberg in Slate as "code words" for institutionalized segregation and racism. States' rights was the banner under which groups like the Defenders of State Sovereignty and Individual Liberties argued in 1955 against school desegregation. In 1981, former Republican Party strategist Lee Atwater, when giving an anonymous interview discussing former president Richard Nixon's Southern strategy, speculated that terms like "states' rights" were used for dog-whistling:

You start out in 1954 by saying, "Nigger, nigger, nigger." By 1968, you can't say "nigger" – that hurts you. Backfires. So you say stuff like forced busing, states' rights, and all that stuff. You're getting so abstract now, you're talking about cutting taxes. And all these things you're talking about are totally economic things and a byproduct of them is [that] blacks get hurt worse than whites. And subconsciously maybe that is part of it. I'm not saying that. But I'm saying that if it is getting that abstract, and that coded, that we are doing away with the racial problem one way or the other. You follow me – because obviously sitting around saying, "We want to cut this" is much more abstract than even the busing thing, and a hell of a lot more abstract than "Nigger, nigger."

Atwater was contrasting this with then-President Ronald Reagan's campaign, which he felt "was devoid of any kind of racism, any kind of reference". However, Ian Haney López, an American law professor and author of the 2014 book Dog Whistle Politics, described Reagan as "blowing a dog whistle" when the candidate told stories about "Cadillac-driving 'welfare queens' and 'strapping young bucks' buying T-bone steaks with food stamps" while he was campaigning for the presidency. He argues that such rhetoric pushes middle-class white Americans to vote against their economic self-interest in order to punish "underserved minorities" who, they believe, are receiving too much public assistance at their expense. According to López, conservative middle-class whites, convinced by powerful economic interests that minorities are the enemy, supported politicians who promised to curb illegal immigration and crack down on crime but inadvertently also voted for policies that favor the extremely rich, such as slashing taxes for top income brackets, giving corporations more regulatory control over industry and financial markets, union busting, cutting pensions for future public employees, reducing funding for public schools, and retrenching the social welfare state. He argues that these same voters cannot link rising inequality which has affected their lives to the policy agendas they support, which resulted in a massive transfer of wealth to the top 1 percent of the population since the 1980s.

In the U.S., the phrase "international bankers" is a well-known dog whistle code for Jews. Its use as such is derived from the antisemitic fabrication The Protocols of the Elders of Zion. It was frequently used by the fascist-supporting radio personality Charles Coughlin on his national show. His repeated use of the term was a factor in the distributor CBS opting not to renew his contract. The word "globalists" is similarly widely considered an antisemitic dog whistle.

The term "law and order", particularly used within the 1968 campaign of President Richard Nixon, can be seen as a dog whistle within the lens in accordance to low income communities, particularly in the concern of placing people of African-American and Latino descent in the light of criminal related behavior across the United States.

==== 21st century ====
Journalist Craig Unger wrote that President George W. Bush and Karl Rove used coded "dog-whistle" language in political campaigning, delivering one message to the overall electorate while at the same time delivering quite a different message to a targeted evangelical Christian political base. William Safire, in Safire's Political Dictionary, offered the example of Bush's criticism during the 2004 presidential campaign of the U.S. Supreme Court's 1857 Dred Scott decision denying the U.S. citizenship of any African American. To most listeners the criticism seemed innocuous, Safire wrote, but "sharp-eared observers" understood the remark to be a pointed reminder that Supreme Court decisions can be reversed, and a signal that, if re-elected, Bush might nominate to the Supreme Court a justice who would overturn Roe v. Wade. This view is echoed in a 2004 Los Angeles Times article by Peter Wallsten.

American professor of linguistics, Mark Liberman, has argued that it is common for speech and writing to convey messages that will only be picked up on by part of the audience, but that this does not usually mean that the speaker is deliberately conveying a double message.

During Barack Obama's campaign and presidency, a number of left-wing commentators described various statements about Obama as racist dog-whistles. During the 2008 Democratic primaries, writer Enid Lynette Logan criticized Hillary Clinton's campaign's reliance on code words and innuendo seemingly designed to frame Barack Obama's race as problematic, saying Obama was characterized by the Clinton campaign and its prominent supporters as anti-white due to his association with Rev. Jeremiah Wright, as able to attract only Black votes, as anti-patriotic, a drug user, possibly a drug seller, and married to an angry, ungrateful Black woman. A light-hearted 2008 article by Amy Chozick in The Wall Street Journal questioned whether Obama was too thin to be elected president, given the average weight of Americans; commentator Timothy Noah wrote that this was a racist dog-whistle, because "When white people are invited to think about Obama's physical appearance, the principal attribute they're likely to dwell on is his dark skin." In a 2010 speech, Sarah Palin criticized Obama, saying "we need a commander in chief, not a professor of law standing at the lectern". Harvard professor (and Obama ally) Charles Ogletree called this attack racist, because the true idea being communicated was "that he's not one of us". MSNBC commentator Lawrence O'Donnell called a 2012 speech by Mitch McConnell, in which McConnell criticized Obama for playing too much golf, a racist dog-whistle because O'Donnell felt it was meant to remind listeners of black golfer Tiger Woods, who at the time was going through an infidelity scandal.

In 2011, appearing on Meet the Press, Republican presidential candidate Newt Gingrich had made claims that GOP House budget chairman Paul Ryan had made arrangements on Medicare that were acts of “right wing social engineering”, which is considered an example of how a Political Dog-Whistle can fail to perform its purpose that was initially intended to have a subtle objective of persuasion. After Gingrich made this remark, he faced a heavy amount of criticism from his own political party for sabotaging his own form of political association.

During the 2016 presidential election campaign and on a number of occasions throughout his presidency, Donald Trump was accused of using racial and antisemitic "dog whistling" techniques by politicians and major news outlets. New York Times columnist Ross Douthat remarked that the Trump campaign "slogan 'Make America Great Again' can be read as a dog-whistle to some whiter and more Anglo-Saxon past". In addition to the knowledge of Donald Trump's many forms of dog-whistling, still in regard to the 2016 election, Ian Haney Lopez , author of “Dog Whistle Politics: How Coded Racial Appeals Have Reinvented Racism and Wrecked the Middle Class”, highlighted in a conducted interview with The Chicago Reporter that Trump had used rhetoric that Lopez considered was intended to influence Trump supporters into redirecting “whites who would hesitate to vote for someone who was openly hostile to Latinos and African-Americans” with the use of dog-whistling techniques used by Trump and his campaign such as claiming that the Democratic Party had “done nothing from them” and further stated that “we care for them”. Lopez criticizes these statements and categorizes them as “race-baiting” in the realm of political dog- whistling.

Former Fox News anchor Tucker Carlson has been reported to use dog-whistling tactics on his former commentary show Tucker Carlson Tonight.

During the 2018 gubernatorial race in Florida, Ron DeSantis came under criticism for comments that were allegedly racist, saying: "The last thing we need to do is to monkey this up by trying to embrace a socialist agenda with huge tax increases and bankrupting the state. That is not going to work. That's not going to be good for Florida." DeSantis was accused of using the verb "monkey" as a racist dog whistle; his opponent, Andrew Gillum, was an African American. DeSantis denied that his comment was meant to be racially charged.

Bill Grueskin of the Columbia Journalism Review speculates that the term “dog whistle” has turned itself into its own form of dog-whistling in journalistic circles. Grueskin states that the phrase itself is often used by journalists to state that a political message is subtle rather than persuasive.

In 2023, a Los Angeles area school reported a pride flag that had been put on fire near an elementary school. The governor of California, Gavin Newsom, acknowledged the occurrence as a “hate crime” that was executed by the far right. Newsom further added that the result of the “woke” movement had become its own dog-whistle and was used by oppressors as an excuse to commit hateful acts in order to protest its intended purpose of universal tolerance.

In January 2026, the Department of Labor posted “One Homeland. One People. One Heritage.”. Many saw this post as an occurrence of political dog-whistling that pushed a neo-nazi agenda.

In March 2026 Texas U.S. Senate candidate Jasmine Crockett accused her Democratic opponent James Talarico of supporting ads that were "straight up racist," and called questions of her electability a "dog whistle."

Terms such as "woke", "CRT", and "DEI" have been described as dog whistles against Black people.

== See also ==
- Aesopian language – Communications intended for insiders of a group
- Classical conditioning – Aspect of learning procedure ('Pavlovian response')
- Doublespeak – Language that deliberately disguises, distorts, or reverses the meaning of words
- Euphemism – Mild or indirect word or expression
- Framing (social sciences) – Effect of how information is presented on perception
- Hey, Rube! – 19th century American circus slang
- Knee-jerk – Monosynaptic reflex
- Loaded language – Rhetoric used to influence an audience
- Plausible deniability – Ability to credibly deny responsibility or involvement
- Poisoning the well – Type of informal fallacy
- Political correctness – Measures to avoid offense or disadvantage
- Incitement to ethnic or racial hatred – Criminal offence in several countries
- Shibboleth – Custom or tradition that distinguishes one group from another
- Southern strategy – 20th-century Republican electoral strategy for the Southern US
- Subliminal stimuli – Sensory stimuli below an individual's threshold for conscious perception
- Wedge issue – Divisive political or social issue
