= Post-war Britain (1945–1979) =

Period of British history after World War II and during the Cold War

- 8 May 1945 – 3 May 1979
Second World War	Modern era
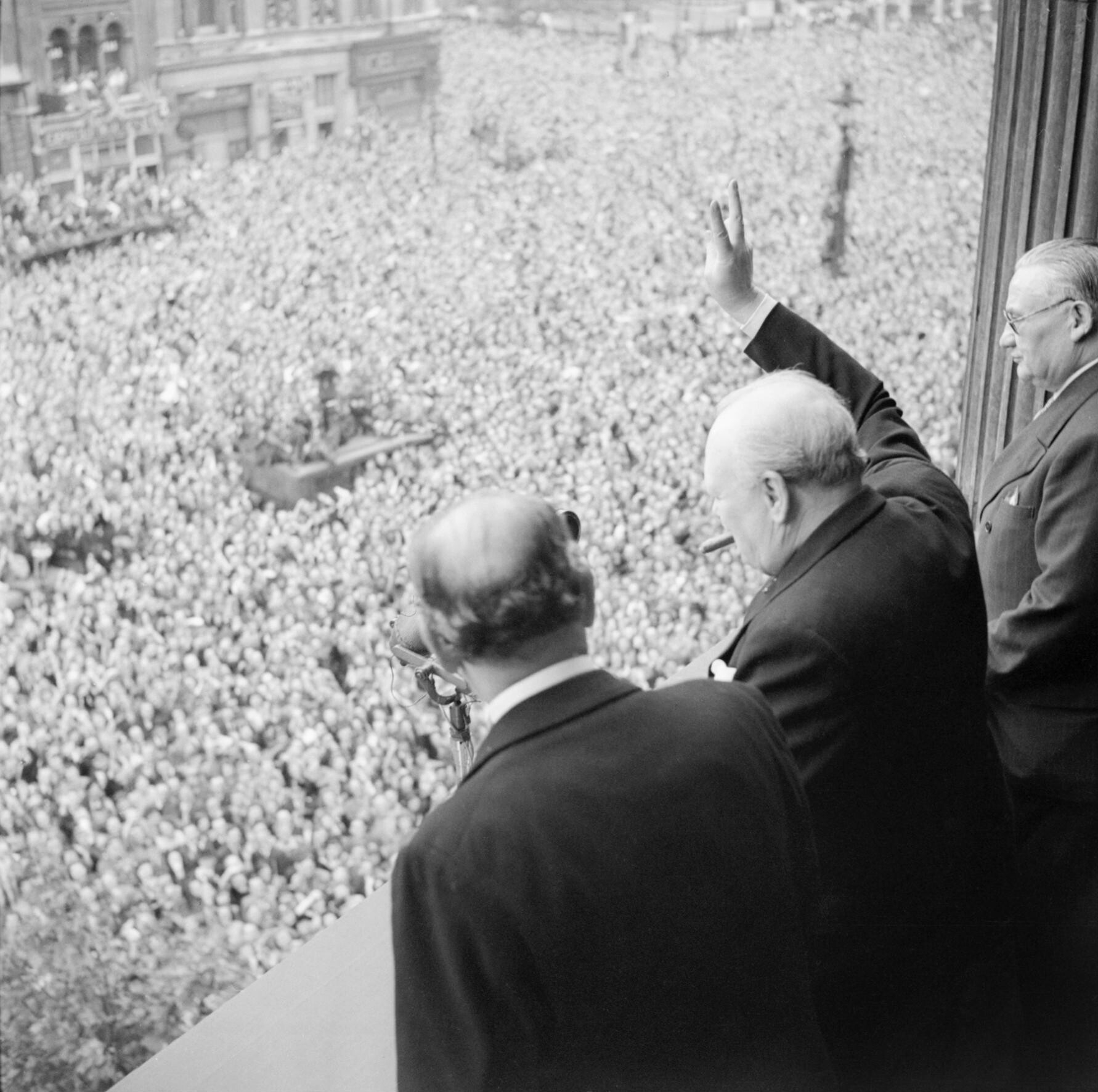
- Winston Churchill waves to crowds on Whitehall on VE Day, 8 May 1945, after broadcasting to the nation that the war against Germany had been won. Minister of Labour, Ernest Bevin, stands to his right, and Chancellor of the Exchequer, Sir John Anderson, stands to his left.
- Monarchs: George VI; Elizabeth II
- Leaders: Winston Churchill; Clement Attlee; Anthony Eden; Harold Macmillan; Alec Douglas-Home; Harold Wilson; Edward Heath; James Callaghan

After Britain emerged victorious from the Second World War, the Labour Party under Clement Attlee won the 1945 general election in a landslide, applying Keynesian Economics, and created a comprehensive welfare state, with the establishment of the National Health Service giving free healthcare to all British citizens, and other reforms to social welfare. The Bank of England, railways, heavy industry and coal mining were all nationalised. Unlike the others, the most controversial issue was nationalisation of steel, which was profitable. Economic recovery was slow, housing was in short supply and bread was rationed along with many necessities in short supply. It was an "age of austerity". American loans and Marshall Plan grants kept the economy afloat. India, Pakistan, Burma and Ceylon gained independence. Britain was a strong anti-Soviet factor in the Cold War and helped found NATO in 1949. Many historians describe this era as the "post-war consensus", emphasising how both the Labour and Conservative Parties until the 1970s tolerated or encouraged nationalisation, strong trade unions, heavy regulation, high taxes, and a generous welfare state.

The Labour Party introduced charges for NHS dental services and glasses in 1951. The Conservatives returned to power in 1951, accepting most of Labour's post-war reforms but introducing prescription charges to the NHS in 1952 and privatising steel in 1953. They presided over thirteen years of economic recovery and stability. However, the Suez Crisis of 1956 demonstrated that Britain was no longer a global superpower. Ghana, Malaya, Nigeria and Kenya were granted independence during this period. Labour returned to power under Harold Wilson in 1964 and oversaw a series of social reforms including the partial decriminalisation of homosexuality and abortion, the relaxation of divorce laws and the end of capital punishment. The Conservative Party led by Edward Heath returned to government from 1970-74 and oversaw the decimalisation of British currency, the accession of Britain to the European Communities and the height of the Troubles in Northern Ireland. In the wake of the 1973 oil crisis and a miner's strike, Heath introduced the three-day working week to conserve power.

After two general elections were held in 1974, Labour made a return to power, but a series of strikes carried out by trade unions over the winter of 1978/79 (known as the Winter of Discontent) paralysed the country and Labour lost its majority in parliament. The 1979 general election resulted in the Conservative Party led by Margaret Thatcher gaining power, effectively ending the postwar state-interventionist consensus that followed since the end of the Second World War; despite initial intense Labour opposition.

== Labour Government, 1945–1951 ==
Following the Second World War, the landslide 1945 election returned the Labour Party to power and Clement Attlee became Prime Minister of the United Kingdom. The party quickly nationalised critical sectors of the economy, especially declining industries. The Bank of England was nationalised along with railways (see Transport Act 1947), coal mining, public utilities and heavy industry. The most controversial case was the takeover of the highly profitable iron and steel industry, which was opposed and finally reversed by the Conservatives.

=== Welfare state ===
A comprehensive welfare state was created with the National Insurance Act 1946, in which people in work paid a flat rate of National Insurance. In return, they (and the wives of male contributors) were eligible for flat-rate pensions, sickness benefit, unemployment benefit, and funeral benefits. Various other pieces of legislation provided for child benefit and support for people with no other source of income.

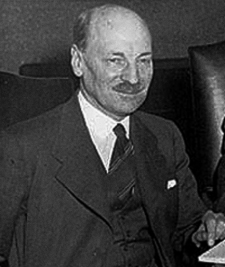
Clement Attlee

In the estimation of historians, and later politicians of the major parties, the most successful and permanent program was the creation of a National Health Service which started operations in 1947. It entitled all citizens to healthcare, which, funded by taxation, was free at the point of delivery. The opposition from physicians was bought off by allowing them to keep lucrative private practices on the side. All hospitals were nationalised and brought into the system. John Carrier and Ian Kendall find that the mission of the Minister of Health Aneurin Bevan was resolving "The potential conflict between the aim of providing a universalist, comprehensive health service of a good standard and that of containing health costs to a reasonable level, and how to finance the system in such a way that certainty and sufficiency of funds could be guaranteed." Michael Foot adds that Bevan had to persuade "the most conservative and respected profession in the country to accept and operate the Labour government's most intrinsically socialist proposition." In the end historians give Bevan the major credit for the success.

One of the main achievements of Attlee's government was the maintenance of near full employment. The government maintained most of the wartime controls over the economy, including control over the allocation of materials and manpower, and unemployment rarely rose above 500,000, or 3% of the total workforce. In fact labour shortages proved to be more of a problem. One area where the government was not quite as successful was in housing, which was also the responsibility of Aneurin Bevan. The government aimed to build 400,000 new houses a year to replace those destroyed in the war, but shortages of materials and manpower meant that less than half this number were built.

=== Foreign affairs ===
Despite the heavy American grants of Lend-Lease food oil and munitions (which did not have to be repaid) plus American loans, and a grant of money and loans from Canada at the end of the war Britain was on the verge of bankruptcy. John Maynard Keynes argued the only solution was to drastically cut back the spending on the British Empire, which amounted to £2,000 million. The post-war overseas deficit was £1,400 million, warned Keynes. and, "it is this expenditure which is wholly responsible for either financial difficulties." Both Churchill and Attlee ignored his advice and kept spending heavily, in part by borrowing from India. The United States provided a large 50-year loan in 1946, and the sudden grant of independence to India and Pakistan in 1947 sharply cut expenses. Marshall Plan money began flowing in 1948, and by the time it ended in 1951 the financial crisis was over. The new Labour government knew the expenses of British involvement across the globe were financially crippling. The post-war military cost £200 million a year, to put 1.3 million men (and a few thousand women) in uniform, keep operational combat fleets stationed in the Atlantic, the Mediterranean, and the Indian Ocean as well as Hong Kong, fund bases across the globe, as well as 120 full Royal Air Force squadrons. Britain now shed traditional overseas military roles as fast as possible. American financial aid was available on Washington's terms, as seen in the 1945 loan, the convertibility of sterling crisis of 1947, the devaluation of sterling in 1949, and the rearmament program in support of the U.S. in the Korean War, 1950–53. On the other hand, he had some success in convincing Washington to take over roles that were too expensive for Britain, including the rebuilding of the European economy and supporting anti-communist governments in Greece and elsewhere. Bevin had the firm support of his party, especially Prime Minister Attlee, despite a left-wing opposition. Top American diplomats such as Dean Acheson trusted Bevin and worked through him.

==== India ====
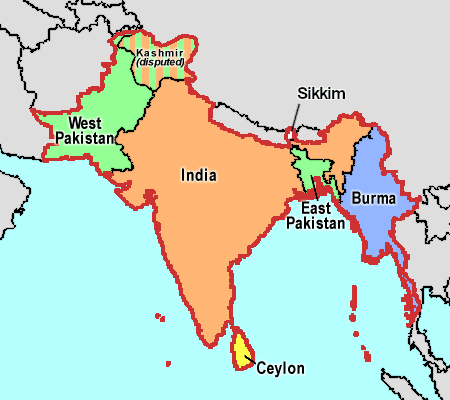
Four nations (India, Pakistan, Dominion of Ceylon, and Union of Burma) that gained independence in 1947 and 1948

For decades the Conservatives were split on India between die-hard imperialists (led by Churchill) and moderate elements who tried to provide limited local control. Meanwhile, the small Labour minority in Parliament was sympathetic to the Congress movement led by Mahatma Gandhi and Jawaharlal Nehru. Decolonisation was never a major election issue; Labour was not officially in favour of decolonisation when it was elected in 1945. With violence escalating in India after the war, but with British financial power at a low ebb, large-scale military involvement was impossible. The Viceroy of India warned he needed a further seven army divisions to prevent communal violence if independence negotiations failed. None were available, so political restructuring was accelerated. The Labour government gave independence to India and Pakistan in an unexpectedly quick move in 1947. One recent historian and Conservative party sympathiser Andrew Roberts says the independence of India was a "national humiliation" but it was necessitated by urgent financial, administrative, strategic and political needs. Whereas Churchill in 1940–1945 had tightened the hold on India and imprisoned the Congress leadership, Labour had looked forward to making it a fully independent dominion like Canada or Australia. Many of the Congress leaders in India had studied in England, and were highly regarded as fellow idealistic socialists by Labour leaders. Attlee was the Labour expert on India and took special charge of decolonization. Attlee found that Churchill's viceroy, Field Marshal Archibald Wavell, was too imperialistic, too keen on military solutions (he wanted seven more Army divisions) and too neglectful of Indian political alignments. The new Viceroy was Lord Mountbatten, the dashing war hero and a cousin of King George VI. The boundary between the newly created states of Pakistan and India involved the widespread resettlement of millions of Muslims and Hindus (and many Sikhs). Extreme violence ensued when Punjab and Bengal provinces were split. Historian Yasmin Khan estimates that between a half-million and a million men, women and children were killed. Gandhi himself was assassinated by a Hindu Mahasabha activist in January 1948. Popular and elite opinion in Britain at the time did not view Indian independence as a humiliation but as a successful completion of a process long underway, and strongly supported by Labour and indeed most of the Conservative party as well. A major reason that Churchill was in the wilderness during the 1930s was his refusal to support the Conservative position in favor of independence for India. Independence strengthened the Commonwealth of Nations, and had a valuable impact on the British economy, with large sums transferring back and forth, as well as fresh migrants arriving from India. In sharp contrast, France felt humiliated by its loss of its colonial empire, especially Algeria and Vietnam. The success in India encouraged and embolden the development programs of ambitious young British colonial officials in Africa and the rest of Asia.

In sharp contrast, the British people were disappointed with their humiliation in Mandatory Palestine. They had managed to alienate both sides. Arabs and Jews had been fighting for years, in nasty conflicts that were still fierce seven decades later. The British decided to get out in 1948 so as not to further alienate their very large clientele in the oil-rich Arab nations.

==== International relations ====
Britain became a founding member of the United Nations during this time and of NATO in 1949. Under foreign minister Ernest Bevin, Britain took a strong anti-Soviet position in the emerging Cold War. Cooperation with the United States was good, except in the area of nuclear weapons, where president Harry Truman ended cooperation. Britain had to develop its own nuclear arsenal, with the first test in 1952. Mandatory military service continued, as despite the end of World War II, Britain continued to wage numerous small colonial conflicts around the globe: the Malayan Emergency, 1948–1960, in Kenya against the Mau Mau Uprising (1952–60) and against Egypt in the 1956 Suez Crisis.

==== Finances ====
International finance was a troublesome issue, as Britain had used up all its reserves and had to borrow large sums from the United States and from the International Monetary Fund. The U.S. provided a loan of $3.75 billion (US$57 billion in 2017) at a low 2% interest rate; Canada loaned an additional US$1.19 billion (US$16 billion in 2017). Starting in 1948, the United States provided grants of $3.3 billion (about US$33 billion in 2017). These funds came through the Marshall Plan and did not have to be repaid, however they carried the proviso that Britain modernise the management of its major corporations. The aid permitted Britain to provide consumption at tolerable levels despite the austerity. About 40 per cent of the dollars went for food, drink and tobacco from the U.S. and 40 per cent on raw materials. The remainder went mostly for machinery and oil.

By 1950, the Korean War caused a new heavy drain on the Treasury for military expenses. This caused the bitter split inside the Labour party. The Conservatives made austerity a major issue in the general election of 1950. Labour lost most of its large majority. The swing was 3.6% against it and it lost 78 seats, leaving Attlee with a slim majority in the House. However, a year later Labour lost the general election of 1951 despite polling more votes than in the 1945 election, and indeed more votes than the Conservative Party.

== Conservative Government, 1951–1964 ==
=== Winston Churchill (1951–1955) ===
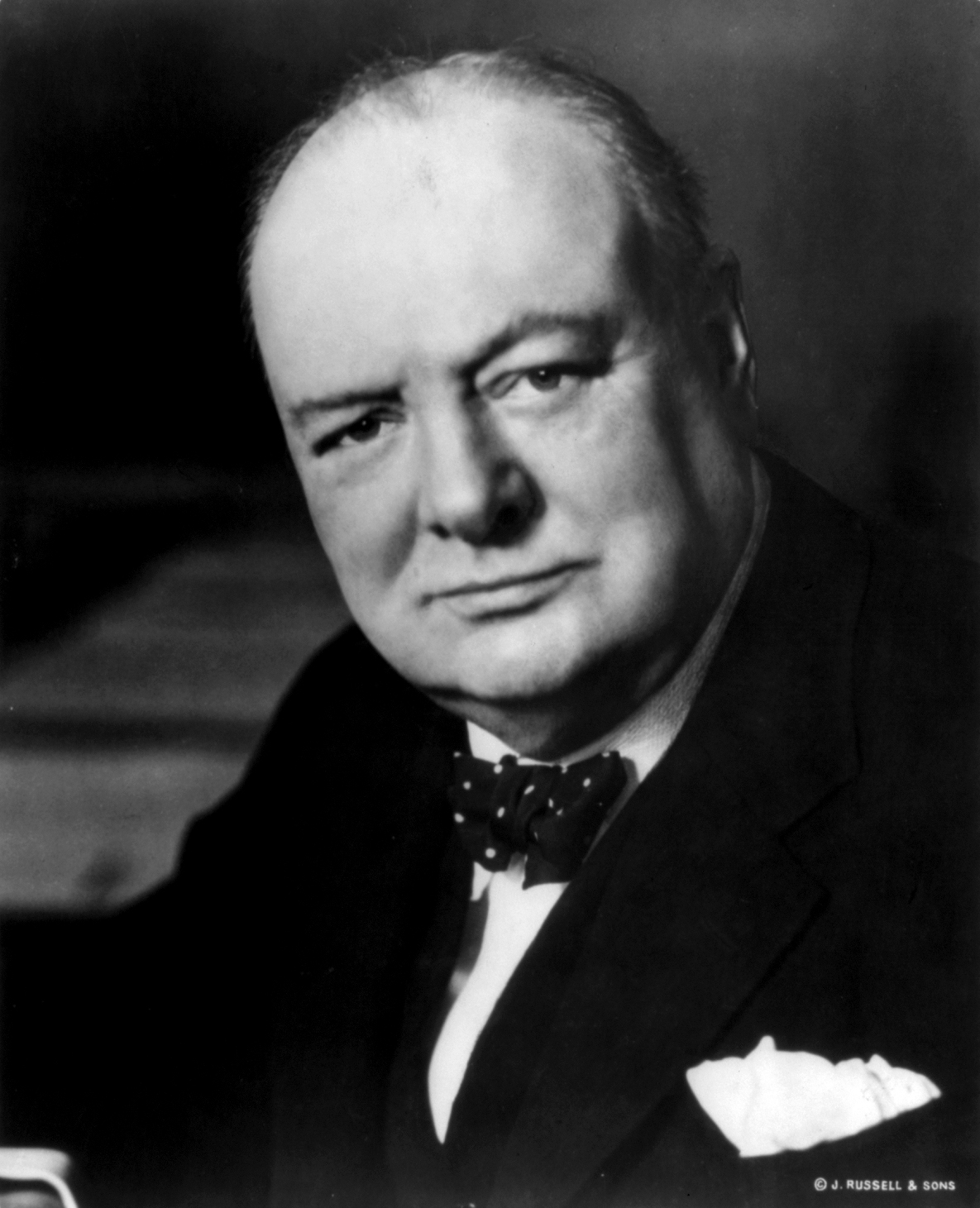
Winston Churchill

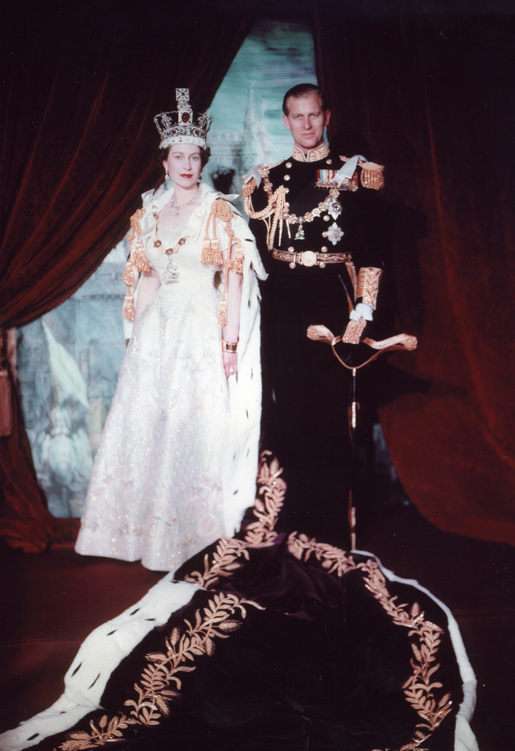
Newly crowned Queen Elizabeth II and her husband Prince Philip

Winston Churchill again became prime minister. His third government – after the wartime national government and the short caretaker government of 1945 – would last until his resignation in 1955. During this period he renewed what he called the "special relationship" between Britain and the United States, and engaged himself in the formation of the post-war order.

His domestic priorities followed the post-war consensus with minor adjustments. However, foreign policy crises took centre stage. They were partly the result of the continued decline of British military and imperial prestige and power.

In February 1952, King George VI died and was succeeded by his eldest daughter Elizabeth II. Her coronation on 2 June 1953 gave the British people a renewed sense of national pride and enthusiasm which had been lowered by the war.

==== Anglo-Iranian Oil Dispute ====
In March 1951, the Iranian parliament (the Majlis) voted to nationalise the Anglo-Persian Oil Company (AIOC) and its holdings by passing a bill strongly backed by Mohammad Mosaddegh, who was elected prime minister the following April by a large majority of the parliament. The International Court of Justice was called in to settle the dispute, but a 50/50 profit-sharing arrangement, with recognition of nationalisation, was rejected by Mossadegh. Direct negotiations between the British and the Iranian government ceased, and over the course of 1951, the British ratcheted up the pressure on the Iranian government and explored the possibility of a coup against it. U.S. President Truman was reluctant to agree, placing a much higher priority on the Korean War. Churchill's return to power and Dwight D. Eisenhower's presidency brought with them a policy of undermining the Mossadegh government. Both sides floated proposals unacceptable to the other, each side believing that time was on its side. Negotiations broke down, and as the blockade's political and economic costs mounted inside Iran, coup plots arose from the army and pro-British factions in the Majlis.

==== The Mau Mau Rebellion ====
In 1951, grievances against the colonial distribution of land came to a head with the Kenya Africa Union demanding greater representation and land reform. When these demands were rejected, more radical elements came forward, launching the Mau Mau rebellion in 1952. On 17 August 1952, a state of emergency was declared, and British troops were flown to Kenya to deal with the rebellion. As both sides increased the ferocity of their attacks, the country moved to full-scale civil war.

==== Malayan Emergency ====
In Malaya, a rebellion against British rule had been in progress since 1948, led by Communists based in the local Chinese community. Once again, Churchill's government inherited a crisis, and once again Churchill chose to use direct military action against those in rebellion while attempting to build an alliance with those who were not. He stepped up the implementation of a "hearts and minds" campaign and approved the creation of fortified villages, a tactic that would become a recurring part of Western military strategy in South-East Asia, especially in the American role in the Vietnam War.

=== Anthony Eden (1955–1957) ===
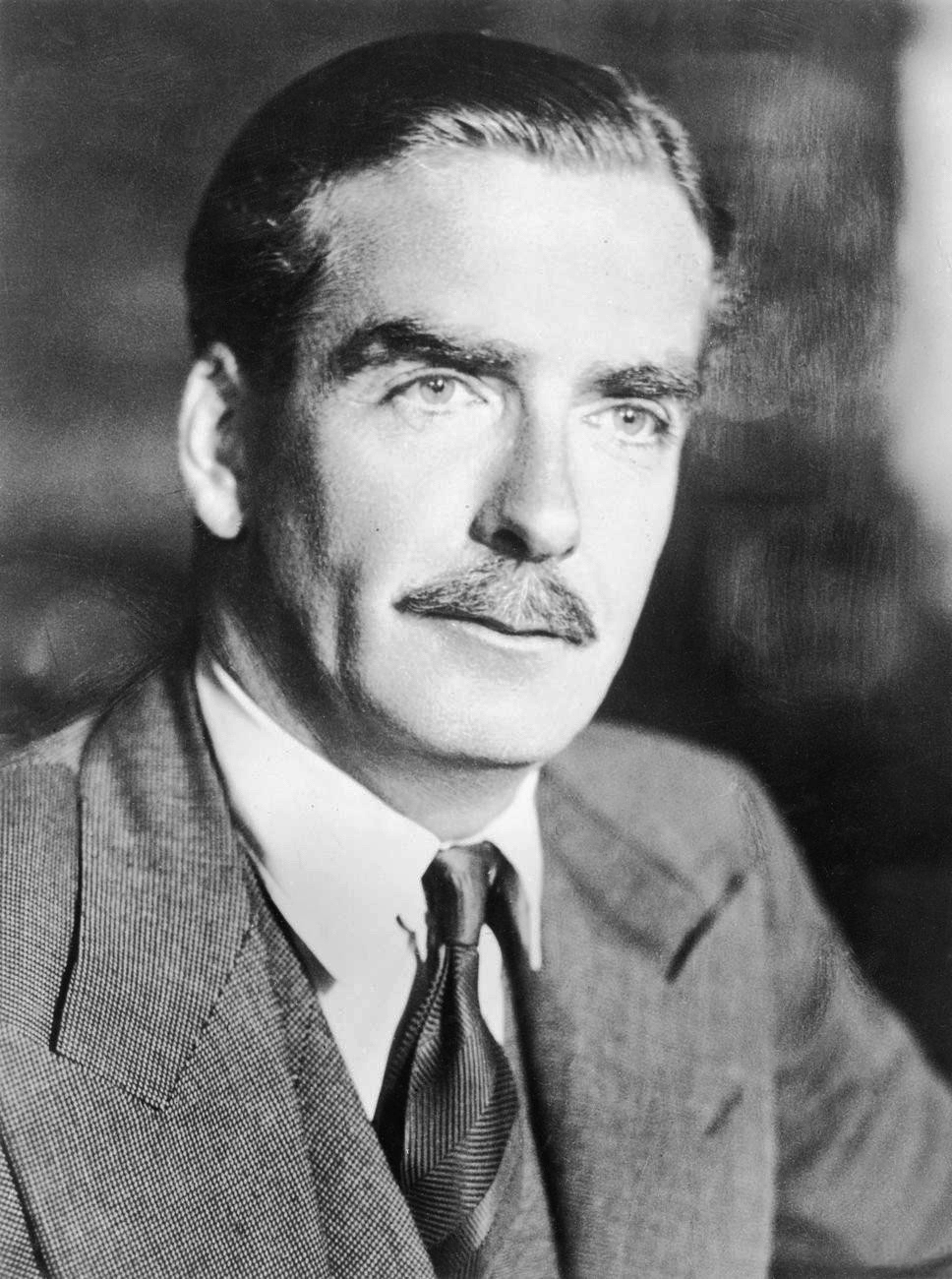
Anthony Eden

==== Suez Crisis ====
In April 1955, Churchill finally retired, and Anthony Eden succeeded him as prime minister. Eden was a very popular figure, as a result of his long wartime service and also his famous good looks and charm. On taking office he immediately called a general election, at which the Conservatives were returned with an increased majority. He left domestic issues to his lieutenants such as Rab Butler, and concentrated largely on foreign policy, forming a close alliance with US President Dwight D. Eisenhower.

On 26 July 1956 Gamal Abdel Nasser, President of Egypt, nationalised the Suez Canal company, in violation of the international agreement he had signed with the UK in 1954. It had been owned and controlled by Britain since 1875 and was seen as essential to national defence and access to the Far East. Eden drawing on his experience in the 1930s, saw Nasser as another Mussolini who had to be stopped. In November 1956, after months of negotiation and attempts at mediation had failed to dissuade Nasser, Britain and France, in conjunction with Israel, invaded Egypt and occupied the Suez Canal Zone.

Dwight D. Eisenhower had warned Eden not to do it, saying the American people would never approve of a military solution to the crisis. He threatened to use financial pressure unless the British withdrew from Egypt. Eden had ignored Britain's financial dependence on the US in the wake of World War II, and was forced to bow to American pressure to withdraw. Eden had poor staff support because the Foreign Office, Commonwealth Relations Office, and Colonial Office had been slow to realise the need for change in Britain's world role. After Suez they started to heed Treasury warnings about the effect of high defence expenditure on the economy, and the slow growth of the British population compared with the United States and the Soviet Union. Historians often use the crisis to mark the end of Britain's status as a superpower, being able to act and control international affairs without assistance or coalition.

=== Harold Macmillan (1957–1963) ===
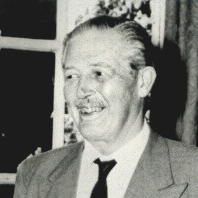
Harold Macmillan

Eden resigned in the wake of the Suez Crisis, and his Chancellor of the Exchequer, Harold Macmillan succeeded him as prime minister on 10 January. He brought the economic concerns of the exchequer into the premiership, but his approach to the economy was to seek high employment; whereas his treasury ministers argued that to support the Bretton Woods system's requirement on the pound sterling would require strict control of the money base, and hence a rise in unemployment. Their advice was rejected and in January 1958, all the Treasury ministers resigned. Macmillan brushed aside this incident as 'a little local difficulty'.

Macmillan wanted the new National Incomes Commission to institute controls on income as part of his growth without inflation policy; it failed when the trade unions boycotted it.

One of Macmillan's more noteworthy actions was the end of conscription. National Service ended gradually from 1957; in November 1960 the last men entered service. With British youth no longer subject to military service and with post-war rationing and reconstruction ended, the stage was set for the social uprisings of the 1960s to commence.

Macmillan took close control of foreign policy. He worked to narrow the post-Suez rift with the US, where his wartime friendship with Dwight D. Eisenhower was useful, and the two had a pleasant conference in Bermuda as early as March 1957. The amiable relationship continued with President John F. Kennedy after 1960. Macmillan also saw the value of a rapprochement with Continental Europe and sought entry to the Common Market. In terms of the Empire, Macmillan continued decolonisation, his Wind of Change (speech) in February 1960 indicating his policy. Ghana and Malaya were granted independence in 1957, Nigeria in 1960 and Kenya in 1963. However, in the Middle East Macmillan ensured Britain remained a force – intervening over Iraq in 1958 (14 July Revolution) and 1960 and becoming involved in Oman. Immigrants from the Commonwealth flocked to England after the British Government posted invitations in the British West Indies, for Workers to come to England to "help the mother Country".

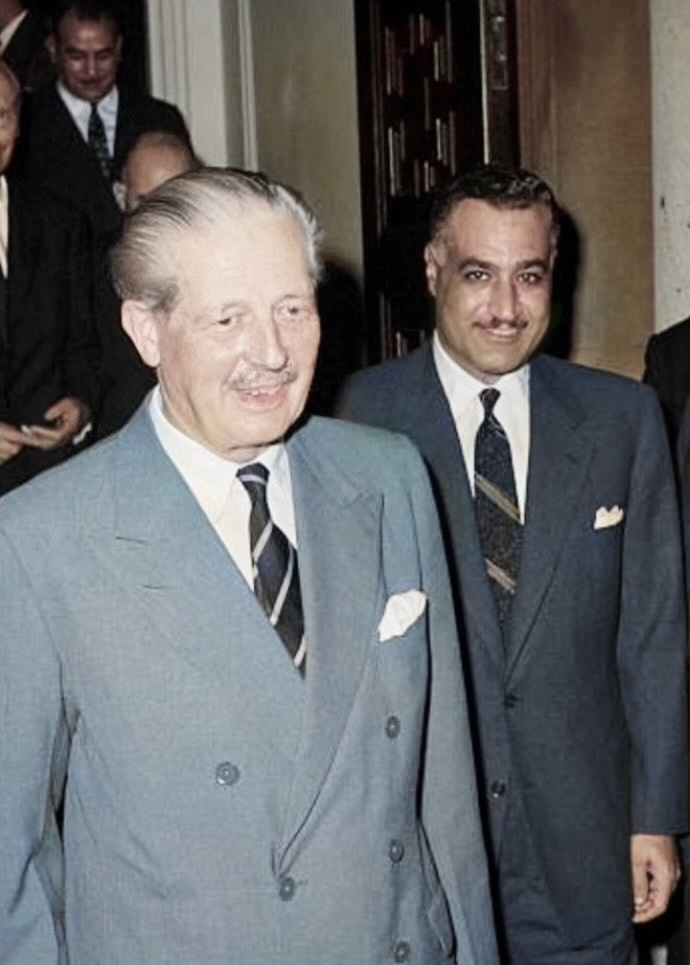
Harold Macmillan meeting Gamal Abdel Nasser in 1960

He led the Tories to victory in the October 1959 general election, increasing his party's majority from 67 to 107 seats.

Following the technical failures of a British independent nuclear deterrent with the Blue Streak and the Blue Steel projects, Macmillan negotiated the supply of American Polaris missiles under the Nassau Agreement in December 1962. Previously he had agreed to base sixty Thor missiles in Britain under joint control, and since late 1957 the American McMahon Act had been eased to allow Britain more access to nuclear technology. Britain, the US, and the Soviet Union signed the Partial Test Ban Treaty in autumn 1963. Britain's application to join the Common Market was vetoed by French President Charles de Gaulle on 29 January 1963, in due to his fear that 'the end would be a colossal Atlantic Community dependent on America', and personal anger at the Anglo-American nuclear deal.

Britain's balance of payments problems led to the imposition of a seven-month wage freeze in 1961. This caused the government to lose popularity and led to a series of by-election defeats. He organised a major Cabinet change in July 1962 but he continued to lose support from within his party.

He resigned on 18 October 1963 after he had been admitted to hospital for prostate trouble. He died 23 years later, in 1986.

=== Alec Douglas-Home (1963–1964) ===
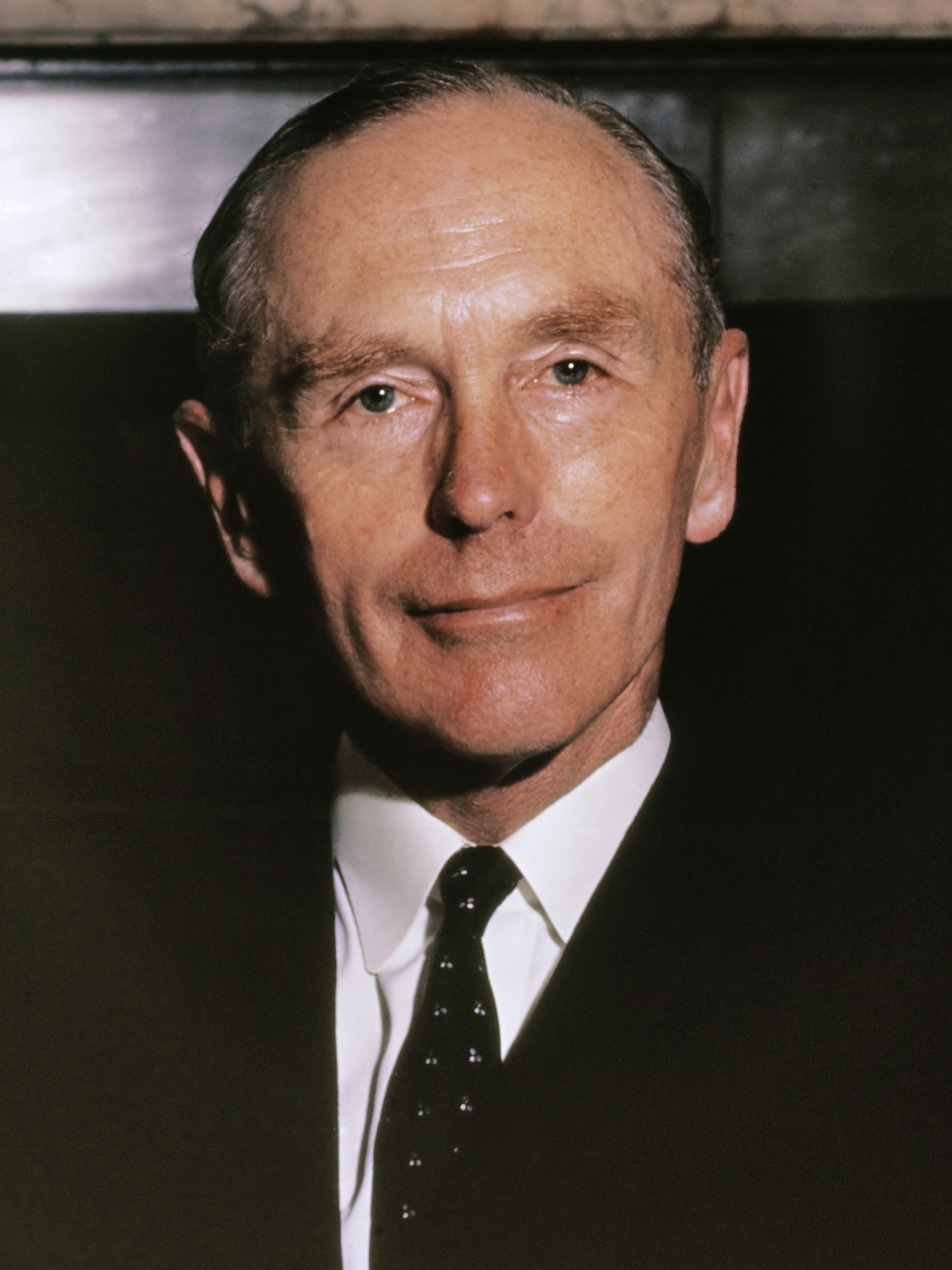
Alec Douglas-Home

Macmillan's successor was the Earl of Home, Alec Douglas-Home. However, as no prime minister had led from the House of Lords since the Marquess of Salisbury in 1902, Home chose to become a member of parliament so he could enter the House of Commons. He disclaimed his earldom and, as "Sir Alec Douglas-Home", contested a by-election in the safe seat of Kinross & West Perthshire. He won and is the only prime minister to resign the Lords to enter the Commons. His demeanor and appearance remained aristocratic and old-fashioned, however. His understanding of economics was primitive, and he gave his chancellor Reginald Maudling free rein to handle financial affairs. Home's few domestic policies were not well received, but he did abolish retail price maintenance, which allowed consumers to find more bargains on sale. He enjoyed dealing with foreign policy, but there were no major crises or issues to resolve. His Foreign Minister Rab Butler was not especially energetic. Britain's application to join Europe had already been vetoed by de Gaulle, the Cuban Missile Crisis had been resolved, and Berlin was again on the back burner. Decolonisation issues were largely routine, and the Rhodesia and South African crises lay in the future.

In the 1964 general election, the Labour Party was returned to power under Harold Wilson. Douglas-Home became Leader of the Opposition. In July 1965, Edward Heath defeated Reginald Maudling and Enoch Powell to succeed him as Conservative Party leader. Enoch Powell was given the post of Shadow Defence Secretary and became a figure of national prominence when he made the controversial Rivers of Blood speech in 1968, warning on the dangers of mass immigration from Commonwealth nations. It is possible that the Conservatives' success in the 1970 general election was a result of the large public following Powell attained, even as he was sacked from the shadow cabinet.

=== "Thirteen Wasted Years!" ===
"Thirteen Wasted Years!" was a popular slogan attacking the Conservative record 1951–1964. Criticism came primarily from Labour. In addition there were attacks by the right wing of the Conservative Party itself for its tolerance of socialist policies. The critics contend that Britain was overtaken by its economic competitors, and was unable to prevent a troublesome wage-price upward spiral. Historian Graham Goodlad calls for taking a longer perspective. He argues that there were significant advances in transport, healthcare, and higher education. It is unrealistic to expect that Britain could have continued as a world power after the huge expense of the Second World War, and the independence of India and other colonies. Goodlad says the Conservative foreign-policy leadership properly adjusted Britain's world role by building an independent nuclear capacity and maintaining a leading role in world affairs, and anyway successive governments seldom did a better job.

== Labour Government, 1964–1970 ==
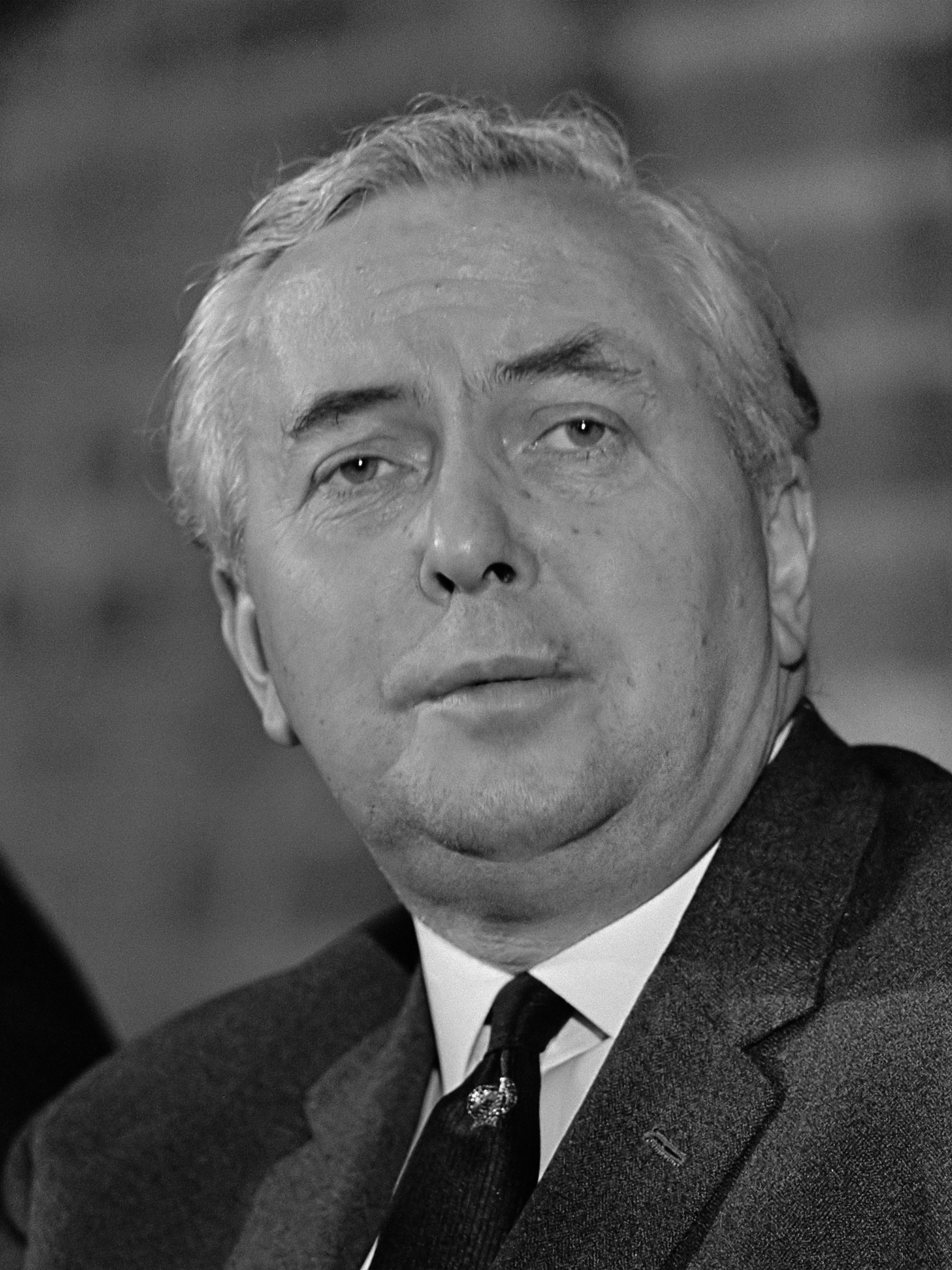
Harold Wilson

=== Harold Wilson ===
In 1964, Labour regained the premiership, as Harold Wilson narrowly won the general election with a majority of five. This was not sufficient to last for a full term and, after a short period of competent government, in March 1966, he won re-election with a landslide majority of 99. As prime minister, his opponents accused him of deviousness, especially over the matter of devaluation of the pound in November 1967. Wilson had rejected devaluation for many years, yet in his broadcast had seemed to present it as a triumph.

==== Open University ====
Wilson regarded with special pride setting up the Open University as a model for Europe. Plans were drafted by Jennie Lee, the Minister for the Arts; she had Wilson's full support. He saw the Open University as a major marker of the Labour Party's commitment to modernisation. He emphasised that it would strengthen a more competitive economy while also fostering greater equality of opportunity and social mobility. He especially favoured heavy use of technology, such as television and radio broadcast of its courses. There were strong doubters and opponents in the government and in commercial broadcasting; Wilson outmaneuvered them to get the budget approved, even though its sums proved far too small.

==== Vietnam War ====
Overseas, Wilson was troubled by crises in Rhodesia and South Africa. The Vietnam War was a delicate issue, as President Lyndon B. Johnson urgently needed a symbolic British military presence. "Lyndon Johnson is begging me even to send a bagpipe band to Vietnam," Wilson told his Cabinet in December 1964. Labour decided not to antagonise its strong antiwar element and refused Johnson's pleas. However, Wilson provided the Americans with intelligence, military weapons, and jungle training, and allowed some 2000 British soldiers to volunteer for service in Vietnam.

==== Industrial strike ====
In addition to the damage done to its reputation by devaluation, Wilson's Government suffered from the perception that its response to industrial relations problems was inadequate. A six-week strike of members of the National Union of Seamen, which began shortly after Wilson' re-election in 1966, did much to reinforce this perception, along with Wilson's own sense of insecurity in office.

== Conservative Government, 1970–1974 ==
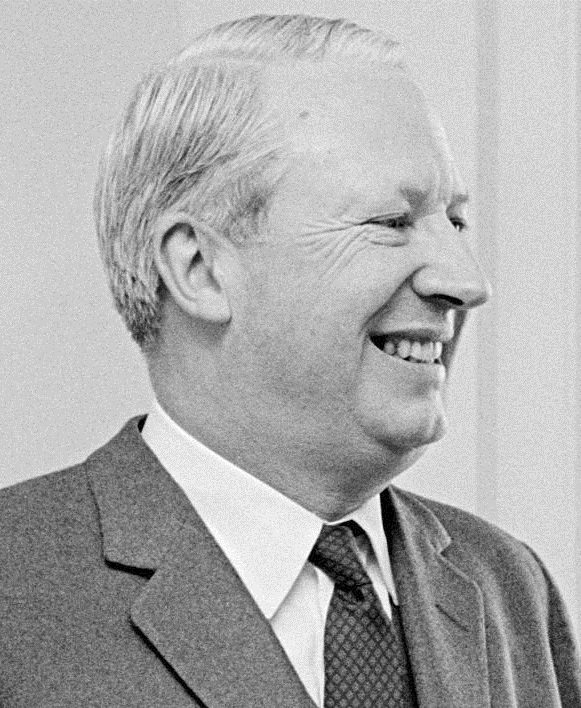
Edward Heath

=== Edward Heath ===
The premiership of his successor, Edward Heath was the bloodiest in the history of the Northern Ireland Troubles. He was prime minister at the time of Bloody Sunday in 1972 when 14 unarmed men were killed by 1st Battalion, Parachute Regiment soldiers during a banned Northern Ireland Civil Rights Association march in Derry. In 2003, he gave evidence to the Saville Inquiry and claimed that he never promoted or agreed to the use of unlawful lethal force in Northern Ireland. In July 1972, he permitted his Secretary of State for Northern Ireland William Whitelaw to hold unofficial talks in London with a Provisional Irish Republican Army delegation by Seán Mac Stíofáin. In the aftermath of these unsuccessful talks, the Heath government pushed for a peaceful settlement with the democratic political parties. In 1974, the Sunningdale Agreement was produced but fiercely repudiated by many Unionists and the Ulster Unionist Party ceased to support the Conservatives at Westminster.

Heath took the United Kingdom into the European Communities, widely known at the time as the "Common Market" (later renamed the European Union) on 1 January 1973 after winning a decisive vote on membership in the House by 336–244, a majority of 112. It was, says biographer John Campbell, "Heath's finest hour." Meanwhile, on the domestic front, galloping inflation led him into confrontation with some of the most powerful trade unions. Energy shortages related to the oil shock resulted in much of the country's industry working a Three-Day Week to conserve power. In an attempt to bolster his government, Heath called an election for 28 February 1974. The result was inconclusive: the Conservative Party received a plurality of votes cast, but the Labour Party gained a plurality of seats due to the Ulster Unionist MPs refusing to support the Conservatives. Heath began negotiations with the Liberal Party under Jeremy Thorpe to form a coalition, but, when these failed, resigned as prime minister.

== Labour Government, 1974–1979 ==
=== Harold Wilson (1974–1976) ===
Heath was replaced by Harold Wilson, who returned on 4 March 1974 to form a minority government. Wilson was confirmed in office, with a three-seat majority, in a second election in October of the same year. It was a manifesto pledge in the general election of February 1974 for a Labour government to re-negotiate better terms for British membership in the European Economic Area, and then hold a referendum on whether Britain should stay in the EEC on the new terms. After the House of Commons voted in favour of retaining the Common Market on the renegotiated terms, a referendum was held on 5 June 1975. A majority were in favour of retaining the Common Market. But Wilson was not able to end the economic crisis. Unemployment remained well in excess of 1,000,000, inflation peaked at 24% in 1975, and the national debt was increasing. The rise of punk rock bands such as the Sex Pistols and The Clash were a reflection of the discontent felt by British youth during the difficulties of the late 1970s.

=== James Callaghan (1976–1979) ===
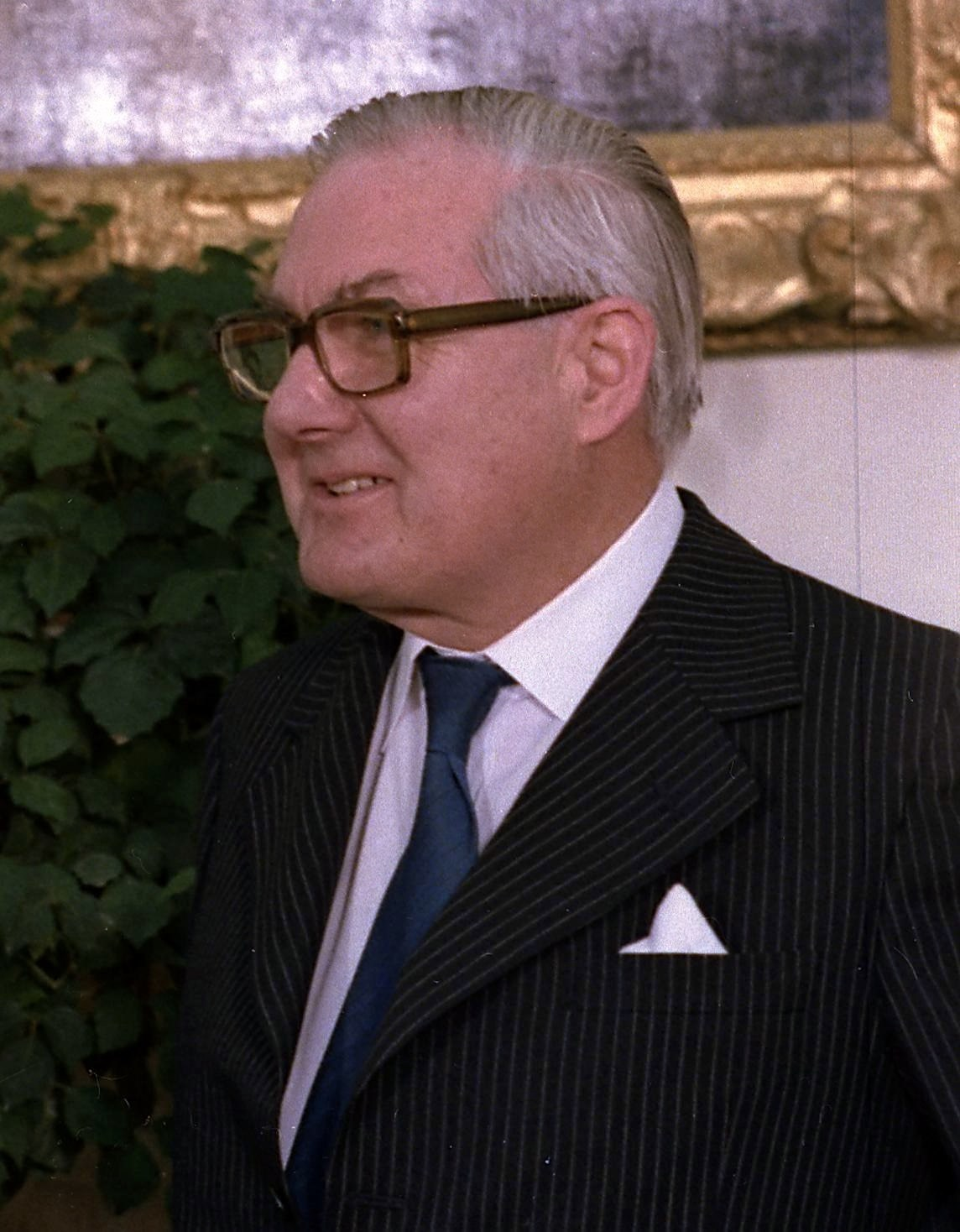
James Callaghan

Wilson announced his surprise resignation on 16 March 1976 and unofficially endorsed his Foreign Secretary James Callaghan as his successor. His broad popularity in many parts of the Labour movement saw him through three ballots of Labour MPs, defeating the arch-Bevanite Michael Foot, the main left-wing candidate. Callaghan was the first prime minister to have held all three leading Cabinet positions – Chancellor of the Exchequer, home secretary and foreign secretary – prior to becoming prime minister.

Callaghan's support for and from the union movement should not be mistaken for a left-wing position. Callaghan continued Wilson's policy of a balanced Cabinet and relied heavily on Michael Foot. Foot was made Leader of the House of Commons and given the task of steering through the government's legislative programme.

Callaghan's time as prime minister was dominated by the troubles in running a government with a minority in the House of Commons; by-election defeats had wiped out Labour's three-seat majority by early 1977. Callaghan was forced to make deals with minor parties in order to survive, including the Lib–Lab pact. He had been forced to accept referendums on devolution in Scotland and Wales (the first went in favour but did not reach the required majority, and the second went heavily against).

However, by the autumn of 1978 the economy was showing signs of recovery – although unemployment now stood at 1,500,000, economic growth was strong and inflation had fallen below 10%. Most opinion polls were showing Labour ahead and he was expected to call an election before the end of the year. He decided not to.

Callaghan's way of dealing with the long-term economic difficulties involved pay restraint which had been operating for four years with reasonable success. He gambled that a fifth year would further improve the economy and allow him to be re-elected in 1979, and so attempted to hold pay rises to 5% or less. The Trade Unions rejected continued pay restraint and in a succession of strikes over the winter of 1978/79 (known as the Winter of Discontent) secured higher pay, although it had virtually paralysed the country, tarnished Britain's political reputation and seen the Conservatives surge ahead in the opinion polls.

He was forced to call an election when the House of Commons passed a Motion of No Confidence by one vote on 28 March 1979. The Conservatives, with advertising consultants Saatchi & Saatchi, ran a campaign on the slogan "Labour isn't working." As expected, Margaret Thatcher (who had succeeded Edward Heath as Conservative leader in February 1975) won the general election held on 3 May, becoming Britain's first female prime minister.

Historian Kenneth O. Morgan states:

The fall of James Callaghan in the summer of 1979 meant, according to most commentators across the political spectrum, the end of an ancien régime, a system of corporatism, Keynesian spending programmes, subsidized welfare, and trade union power.

Historians Alan Sked and Chris Cook have summarised the general consensus of historians regarding Labour in power in the 1970s:

If Wilson's record as prime minister was soon felt to have been one of failure, that sense of failure was powerfully reinforced by Callaghan's term as premier. Labour, it seemed, was incapable of positive achievements. It was unable to control inflation, unable to control the unions, unable to solve the Irish problem, unable to solve the Rhodesian question, unable to secure its proposals for Welsh and Scottish devolution, unable to reach a popular modus vivendi with the Common Market, unable even to maintain itself in power until it could go to the country and the date of its own choosing. It was little wonder, therefore, that Mrs. Thatcher resoundingly defeated it in 1979.
