= Klaus Staeck =

German lawyer and publisher (born 1938)

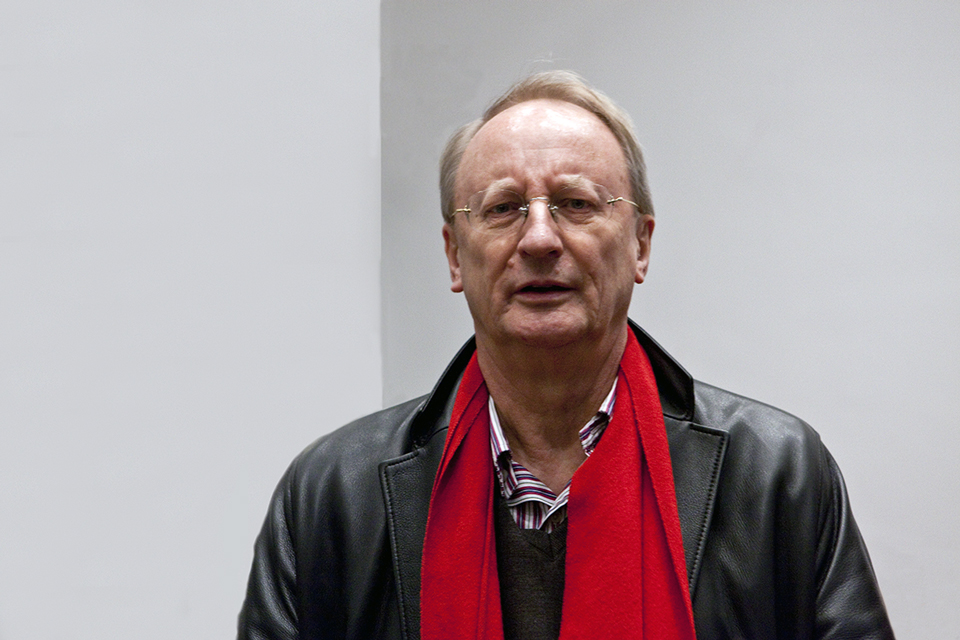
Staeck in 2009

Klaus Staeck (born 28 February 1938 in Pulsnitz) is a German lawyer and publisher who is best known in Germany for his political graphic design work. From 2006 to 2015 he was president of the Akademie der Künste at Berlin.

== Early life and education ==
Klaus Staeck grew up in the East German city of Bitterfeld. After passing the Abitur in 1956 he moved to the West German city of Heidelberg where he lives down to the present day.

From 1957 until 1962, Staeck studied law at Heidelberg, Hamburg, and Berlin before taking both state exams. He was admitted to the German bar in 1969.

== Career ==
Staeck began to teach himself how to work as a graphic designer while pursuing his legal studies, creating posters, postcards, and flyers. In 1960, Staeck became a member of Social Democratic Party of Germany (SPD). In the late 1960s he took part in local politics in Heidelberg. Over the years he created three hundred different motifs, drawing from current political discussions. He took sides for the poor, the environment, and for peace, urging his countrymen to join him and to interfere in political affairs. In his campaigns he employed claims such as, e.g., Deutsche Arbeiter – die SPD will euch eure Villen im Tessin wegnehmen ("German workers: the SPD seeks to take away your villas in Tessin from you"), or Die Reichen müssen noch reicher werden – deshalb CDU ("The rich must become richer yet, therefore vote CDU").

Since 1986 Staeck has been visiting professor at Kunstakademie Düsseldorf.

From 2006 until 2015 he was president of Berlin Akademie der Künste, and said upon leaving "I hope that after 300 years, a woman will finally become president".

In a 2016 interview about the Jan Böhmermann case of political satire he said he was "convinced that the judge will decide in favor of freedom of expression".

== Work ==
In the beginning Staeck made woodcut prints, while from 1967 onward he changed to screen printing. Staeck is probably best known for his political poster art. He is also known for his election posters. Staeck managed to finance his political actions by selling his artwork in Edition Tangente publishing house which later came to be known as Edition Staeck. He worked together with other political artists and writers, most notably Joseph Beuys, Panamarenko, Dieter Roth, Nam June Paik, Wolf Vostell, Daniel Spoerri, Günter Grass, Walter Jens, and Heinrich Böll who publicly spoke out in his favour. At the beginning of the 1970s Staeck began his long time collaboration with Gerhard Steidl.

As of 2012, Klaus Staeck was sued in 41 cases for his artwork to be banned from public, to no avail. A typical press release would point out that he would be "present" in court, very much like an invitation to an exhibition opening that says: "The artist is present." A recent dissertation thesis reviewing the cases brought against Staeck between 1972 and 1999 from research conducted in his own archive concludes that his approach to appear in court and to bring in the media was a concept that "in the end may have proved successful".

As of 2022, Staeck still creates work, especially regarding climate change.

== Awards ==
Klaus Staeck was awarded the first Zille prize for political graphic design in 1970, and the Großes Bundesverdienstkreuz in 2007.

== Collections ==
Staeck's work is held in the following permanent collections:

- Museum of Modern Art, New York: 12 works (as of 15 February 2022)
- Walker Art Center, Minneapolis, Minnesota: 3 works (as of 15 February 2022)

== Group exhibitions ==
- Automania, Museum of Modern Art, New York, 2021–22
