= 2008 Austrian legislative election campaign posters =

The political parties used numerous campaign posters in the 2008 Austrian legislative election.

== Social Democratic Party of Austria ==
The SPÖ announced on 30 July 2008 that it would put up the first election posters on 3 August 2008; they featured a picture of Faymann, his name and the words "Enough bickering." (Genug gestritten.), thus criticising the grand coalition's lack of agreement on fundamental issues, which the SPÖ attributes to the ÖVP's refusal to accept that the ÖVP lost the 2006 election. The poster was attacked by ÖVP, who claimed that the SPÖ was responsible for the disputes in the coalition, and the smaller parties, who feared a costly election campaign due to the early start of the campaign. A second poster was presented at the federal party conference on 8 August 2008, which also prominently featured Faymann, but had no thematic content. A third poster was presented on 29 August 2008, when the SPÖ officially started its election campaign in the Wiener Stadthalle in Vienna; it emphasised Faymann's personal qualities.

The text of the SPÖ election posters was:

First wave

- 1st SPÖ election poster: "Enough bickering." (Genug gestritten.)

Second wave

- 2nd SPÖ election poster: "Faymann. The new choice." (Faymann. Die neue Wahl.)

Third wave

- 3rd SPÖ election poster: "Caring. Determined. Reliable. – Faymann. The new choice." (Sozial. Entschlossen. Zuverlässig. – Faymann. Die neue Wahl.)

On 22 August 2008, the day of the TV debate between Strache and Haider, the SPÖ put up online advertisements pointing to the time of the TV debate and calling it "two good reasons to vote for Faymann: today, 21:15 ORF2". Furthermore, the SPÖ-affiliated Socialist Youth Austria (Sozialistische Jugend Österreich) on 27 August 2008 presented an election campaign (gegenrechts.at, gegen Rechts meaning "against the right") calling for an end to the majority of the right in parliament and for preventing an ÖVP–FPÖ–BZÖ coalition.

=== Austrian People's Party ===
The ÖVP presented its first wave of election posters on 5 August 2008. Unlike the SPÖ's posters, they didn't feature Molterer; what the three subjects have in common are the words Molterer used to break up the grand coalition, "That's enough!" (Es reicht!) and the words "A new start instead of stalemate" (Neustart statt Stillstand). The different posters call for doubling home care subsidies, stricter immigration controls and doubling family subsidies in September to help families with children in education. The SPÖ refused to comment on these posters, the Greens were horrified that it was neither the FPÖ nor the BZÖ but the ÖVP which first brought an anti-immigrant tone into the election campaign and both FPÖ and BZÖ considered it proof that the ÖVP did not consider Molterer to be charismatic enough to win the election. A second wave of election posters with new thematic priorities was officially presented on 26 August 2008; one of the posters (previewed in Österreich on 24 August 2008) called for harsher punishments for child abusers and showed two judges about to hand down a judgment, in a change from the nonpictorial earlier election posters. SPÖ justice minister Maria Berger strongly criticised the ÖVP for trying to influence decisions in the court room through the election campaign, and the judges' association (Richtervereinigung) also strongly criticised the election poster's intent. The ÖVP officially started its election campaign on 5 September 2008 in the Helmut-List-Halle in Graz. The third and last wave of two election posters prominently featuring Molterer and the slogan "The better choice." (Die bessere Wahl.) was presented on 10 September 2008; furthermore, the ÖVP in September 2008 employed TV and radio spots criticising the SPÖ for the cost of its campaign promises and for not keeping them after the 2006 election.

The text of the ÖVP election posters was:

First wave

- 1st ÖVP election poster: "An end to saving books checkup: Double home care subsidies! – for 24-hour care" (Schluss mit Sparbuch-Kontrolle: Pflegeförderung verdoppeln! – für 24-Stunden-Betreuung)
- 2nd ÖVP election poster: "Who lives with us has to learn our language. No immigration without German lessons. – no rights without obligations" (Wer bei uns lebt, muss unsere Sprache lernen. Ohne Deutschkurs keine Zuwanderung. – keine Rechte ohne Pflichten)
- 3rd ÖVP election poster: "Families need help against inflation! Double family subsidies each September. – for all in education" (Familien brauchen Hilfe gegen Teuerung! Familien-Beihilfe jeden September doppelt. – für alle in Ausbildung)

Second wave

- 4th ÖVP election poster: "We protect victims, not perpetrators: Full sharpness of the law for child abuse." (Wir schützen Opfer, nicht Täter: Volle Härte bei Kindesmissbrauch.)
- 5th ÖVP election poster: "We make sure that performance pays off: Taxes down!" (Wir stellen sicher, dass sich Leistung lohnt: Steuern runter!)
- 6th ÖVP election poster: "We produce relief for families: Last year of kindergarten free of charge." (Wir schaffen Entlastung für Familien: Letztes Kindergartenjahr gratis.)

Third wave

- 7th ÖVP election poster: "Keeps his word" (Hält Wort)
- 8th ÖVP election poster: "Provides security" (Gibt Sicherheit)

The Viennese ÖVP put up election posters on 6 August 2008 which consisted only of white text before a red background criticising Faymann for "just smiling, as always" while the SPÖ Vienna "prevented free of charge kindergartens" and "cashed up without hesitation: in housing costs, parking fees, waste disposal fees ...". The Young People's Party (Junge Volkspartei) presented a website attacking Faymann (roterstillstand.at, roter Stillstand meaning "red stalemate") on 28 August 2008.

=== The Greens – The Green Alternative ===
The Greens' first slogan was "Not on my watch" (Nicht mit mir). The first wave of posters was presented on 13 August 2008; they prominently feature Van der Bellen (four different close-ups) and slogans which criticise the other parties (the SPÖ for not trying hard enough to fulfill its election promises, the ÖVP for blocking decisions in government, both parties for their bickering, and the FPÖ and the BZÖ for agitating against immigrants), as well as a circular logo containing "vdb 08" (for Van der Bellen). In addition, a second wave of posters was put up starting with 3 September 2008; the second wave featured positive slogans highlighting four demands of the Greens regarding taxes, human rights, measures against the rising prices and equal opportunities. Half the posters featured the Greens' deputy leader Eva Glawischnig instead of Van der Bellen; the common slogan was "when, if not now!" (wann, wenn nicht jetzt!). The Greens officially started their election campaign on 10 September 2008 in the Architekturzentrum Wien in Vienna. The Greens also held a contest for proposed election posters from the internet community; the four winning designs (as there were two equal third places) were put up as actual election posters on triangle stands from 8 September 2008 onwards.

The text of the Green election posters was:

First wave

- 1st Greens' election poster: "blockade? not on my watch" (blockieren? nicht mit mir)
- 2nd Greens' election poster: "permanent bickering? not on my watch" (dauerstreit? nicht mit mir)
- 3rd Greens' election poster: "agitation? not on my watch" (aufhetzen? nicht mit mir)
- 4th Greens' election poster: "caving in? not on my watch" (umfallen? nicht mit mir)

Second wave

- 5th Greens' election poster: "when, if not now! – half heating costs – out with oil and gas" (wann, wenn nicht jetzt! – heizkosten halbieren – raus aus öl und gas)
- 6th Greens' election poster: "when, if not now! – equal opportunities, equal money – right of way for women" (wann, wenn nicht jetzt! – gleiche chancen, gleiches geld – vorrang für frauen)
- 7th Greens' election poster: "when, if not now! – defend human rights – stop scare tactics" (wann, wenn nicht jetzt! – menschenrechte verteidigen – angstmacher stoppen)
- 8th Greens' election poster: "when, if not now! – tax the rich – relieve the middle ground" (wann, wenn nicht jetzt! – die reichen besteuern – die mitte entlasten)

=== Freedom Party of Austria ===
The FPÖ presented its first wave of election posters on 7 August 2008; they consisted of one big election poster and four to be put on triangle stands (Dreiecksständer); two of them (including the big one) prominently featured FPÖ leader Strache, and all of them depicted an eagle (from the coat of arms of Austria) giving a thumbs up. The main slogan was "They are against HIM. Because HE is for YOU." (Sie sind gegen IHN. Weil ER für EUCH ist.) (which had been Haider's election slogan in the 1994 election campaign), and the slogan on the three other posters was "WE for YOU – Therefore ⊗ FPÖ HC Strache" (WIR für EUCH – Deshalb ⊗ FPÖ HC Strache). The other slogans were rhymed and endeavoured to be witty, similar to the 2006 election campaign; one of them featured a prominent spelling mistake ("heisst" instead of "heißt"), which was corrected later in the day. The FPÖ officially started its election campaign on 29 August 2008 on the Hauptplatz in Linz; a second wave of posters was put up in early September, which consisted of one poster featuring Strache before an Austrian flag and two smaller triangle stand posters.

The text of the FPÖ election posters was:

First wave

- 1st FPÖ election poster: "Social security for our people – They are against HIM. Because HE is for YOU." (Soziale Sicherheit für unsere Leut' – Sie sind gegen IHN. Weil ER für EUCH ist.)
- 2nd FPÖ election poster: "Income to get along with – They are against HIM. Because HE is for YOU." (Einkommen zum Auskommen – Sie sind gegen IHN. Weil ER für EUCH ist.)
- 3rd FPÖ election poster: "Asylum fraud means flight back home – WE for YOU – Therefore ⊗ FPÖ HC Strache." (Asylbetrug heißt Heimatflug – WIR für EUCH – Deshalb ⊗ FPÖ HC Strache)
- 4th FPÖ election poster: "Representatives of the people instead of EU traitors – WE for YOU – Therefore ⊗ FPÖ HC Strache." (Volksvertreter statt EU-Verräter – WIR für EUCH – Deshalb ⊗ FPÖ HC Strache)
- 5th FPÖ election poster: "Homeland needs middle class – WE for YOU – Therefore ⊗ FPÖ HC Strache." (Heimatland braucht Mittelstand – WIR für EUCH – Deshalb ⊗ FPÖ HC Strache)

Second wave

- 6th FPÖ election poster: "Now it is about US AUSTRIANS – Therefore ⊗ FPÖ · HC Strache" (Jetzt geht's um UNS ÖSTERREICHER – Deshalb ⊗ FPÖ · HC Strache)
- 7th FPÖ election poster: "Social instead of socialist – Now it is about US AUSTRIANS – Therefore ⊗ FPÖ · HC Strache" (Sozial statt sozialistisch – Jetzt geht's um UNS ÖSTERREICHER – Deshalb ⊗ FPÖ · HC Strache)
- 8th FPÖ election poster: "Our land for our children – Now it is about US AUSTRIANS – Therefore ⊗ FPÖ · HC Strache" (Unser Land für unsere Kinder – Jetzt geht's um UNS ÖSTERREICHER – Deshalb ⊗ FPÖ · HC Strache)
- 9th FPÖ election poster (Carinthia only): "Reliability instead of THERE & GONE again – Now it is about US AUSTRIANS – Therefore ⊗ FPÖ · HC Strache" (Zuverlässigkeit statt DA & wieder WEG – Jetzt geht's um UNS ÖSTERREICHER – Deshalb ⊗ FPÖ · HC Strache)

=== Alliance for the Future of Austria ===
The BZÖ presented its election posters on 27 August 2008; the three posters prominently featured party leader Haider in different postures which are meant to emphasise his image as a man of the people, the claim that he was "the original" and a stylised Austrian flag at the bottom of the posters. The posters will be put up on 1 September 2008. The BZÖ officially started its election campaign on 30 August 2008 in the Stadthalle Graz.

The text of the BZÖ election posters was:

- 1st BZÖ election poster: "To go the social way! For your sake. Austria. – Jörg Haider's List – The Original! ⊗" (Den sozialen Weg gehen! Deinetwegen. Österreich. – Liste Jörg Haider – Das Original! ⊗)
- 2nd BZÖ election poster: "Austria for Austrians! For your sake. – Jörg Haider's List – The Original! ⊗" (Österreich den Österreichern! Deinetwegen. – Liste Jörg Haider – Das Original! ⊗)
- 3rd BZÖ election poster: "To roll up one's sleeves and tackle problems! For your sake. Austria. – Jörg Haider's List – The Original! ⊗" (Ärmel aufkrempeln und anpacken! Deinetwegen. Österreich. – Liste Jörg Haider – Das Original! ⊗)

=== Liberal Forum ===
The LIF presented its first election poster on 22 August 2008, which featured Schmidt and called for a three-party coalition as the next government; the LIF stated it would prefer an SPÖ–Greens–LIF or ÖVP–Greens–LIF coalition and that it would not work together with the FPÖ and the BZÖ. Further waves of election posters are planned. The LIF officially started its election campaign on 4 September 2008 in the Palmenhaus in the Viennese Burggarten. On 11 September 2008, the LIF presented a second wave of four election posters only to be put up on triangle stands; they shared a common design and image (a portrait of Heide Schmidt) and the text "for fairness" and differed only in what the LIF stated it was against (populism, scare tactics, exclusion, stalemate and taking people for fools).

The text of the LIF election poster was:

First wave

- 1st LIF election poster: "Honesty. Openness. Fairness. Now that would be three-party coalition for the next government! – Heide Schmidt: fairness into government" (Aufrichtigkeit. Offenheit. Fairness. Das wäre doch eine Dreierkoalition für die nächste Regierung! – Heide Schmidt: Fairness in die Regierung)

Second wave

- 2nd LIF election poster: "For fairness. Against scare tactics. – Heide Schmidt: fairness into government" (Für Fairness. Gegen Angstmacherei. – Heide Schmidt: Fairness in die Regierung)
- 3rd LIF election poster: "For fairness. Against exclusion. – Heide Schmidt: fairness into government" (Für Fairness. Gegen Ausgrenzung. – Heide Schmidt: Fairness in die Regierung)
- 4th LIF election poster: "For fairness. Against taking people for fools. – Heide Schmidt: fairness into government" (Für Fairness. Gegen Fürdummverkaufen. – Heide Schmidt: Fairness in die Regierung)
- 5th LIF election poster: "For fairness. Against populism. – Heide Schmidt: fairness into government" (Für Fairness. Gegen Populismus. – Heide Schmidt: Fairness in die Regierung)
- 6th LIF election poster: "For fairness. Against stalemate. – Heide Schmidt: fairness into government" (Für Fairness. Gegen Stillstand. – Heide Schmidt: Fairness in die Regierung)

=== Citizens' Forum Austria ===
The FRITZ started its election campaign on 5 September 2008 on the Freiheitsplatz in Graz. On 15 September 2008, it presented an election poster (featuring Dinkhauser) which was put up in Vienna only.

- FRITZ election poster: "fritz for a fair austria!" (fritz für ein gerechtes österreich!)

=== Other parties ===
The KPÖ started its election campaign on 5 September 2008. Its posters had two different subjects, both of which were only presented on triangle stands:

- 1st KPÖ election poster: "Left. For sure." (Links. Mit Sicherheit)
- 2nd KPÖ election poster: "For redistribution. For equal rights. Solidary. For sure." (Für Umverteilung. Für gleiche Rechte. Solidarisch. Mit Sicherheit.)

Save Austria's slogan was "We citizens now vote for ourselves!" (Wir Bürger wählen uns jetzt selber!). They had an election budget of €100,000.

The Christians started their election campaign on 5 September 2008. They stated they could not afford election posters and widespread advertisements and that they would employ less costly ways of advertising for the election. Their slogan was "Strong families. Strong country." (Starke Familien. Starkes Land.). They refused to announce their election budgets and stated they considered employing newspaper advertisements and election posters in the final phase of the campaign.

The Christians had a triangle stand poster (which was only used online and not put up on actual triangle stands, however):

- Christians' election poster: "Strong families. Strong country. – On 28 September: The Christians ⊗" (Starke Familien. Starkes Land. – Am 28. September: Die Christen ⊗)
