= Election poster =

Form of political advertising

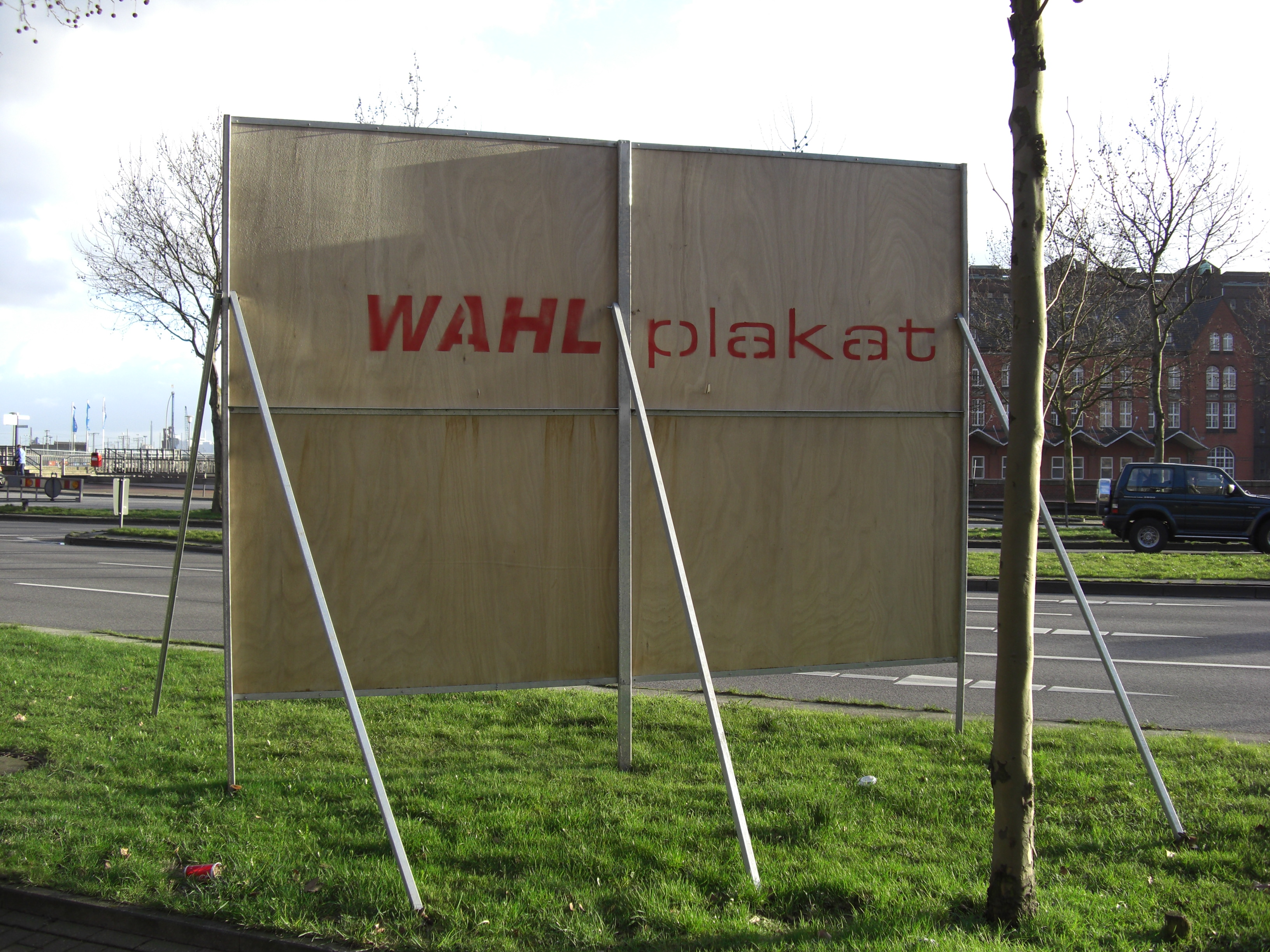
Large election poster from behind

Vandalised poster in Dresden

An election poster is a form of self-promotion and information used by a political party during an election campaign, particularly regarding the election date. Election posters are usually limited to an image of one or more representatives of the respective party, its logo, and a short, concise slogan. Election posters often contain links to additional sources of information for voters (e.g., election events, the party's website). A general distinction can be made between large-format and small-format posters.

Occasionally they are vandalised which is often of public debate surrounding the democratic process.

== Large-format posters ==
Large-format posters are produced by the national or state party association. During election campaigns, mobile large-format billboards are used, which are set up only for the campaign period. A tubular steel structure supports the 2.90 by 3.70 meter weatherproof plywood panels, also called "Wesselmann" (wall-mounted posters).

Starting approximately six weeks before the election, the screens will be set up primarily on main roads and in large squares. Depending on the format, permission may be need to be granted from the local council. For example, in the 2025 German federal election Regensburg city council decided on a three-month deadline for election posters being hanged.

The posters are usually supplied by the parties and are usually replaced three to four times per campaign. After the election, the mobile billboards, of which there are approximately 28,000, are stored. Outside of election campaigns, they are also used commercially.

== Small-format posters ==
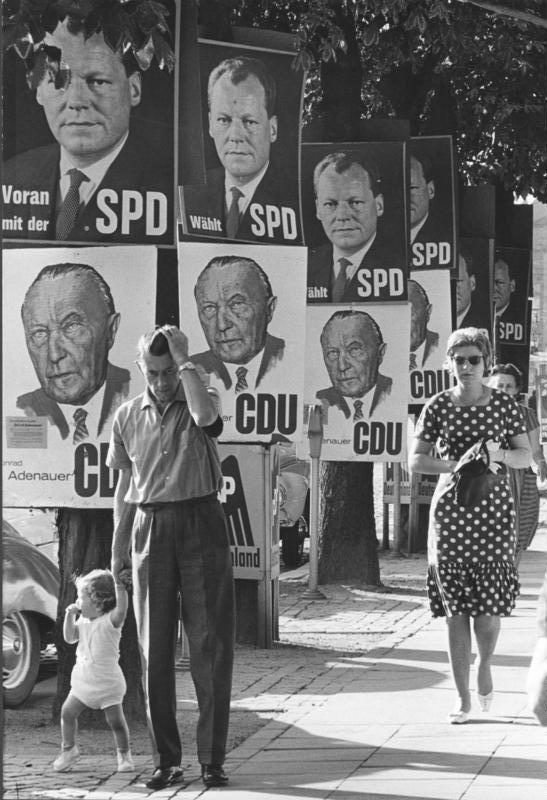
Election posters in the 1961 West German federal election campaign

Small-format posters are often produced by local, district, or state associations to address local issues and introduce direct candidates. National motifs are also often covered with local slogans, event announcements, and the like. Frame posters are also frequently used. These are posters printed with party logos but without any advertising messages. These empty spaces are then individually filled with local slogans or invitations to campaign events using stickers.

== Disruptors ==
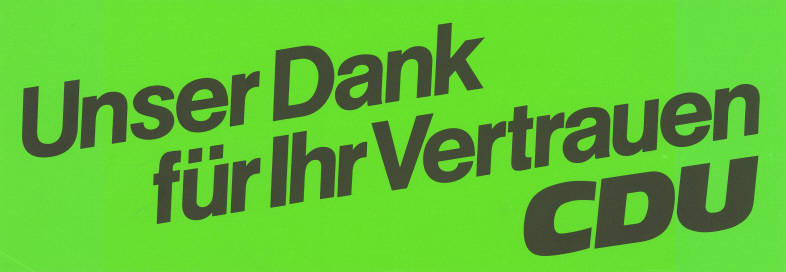
Example of a disruptor: After the election, election posters are often supplemented with a disruptor in a different color, thanking the voters for their votes. In this example, the black of the CDU clashes with neon green.

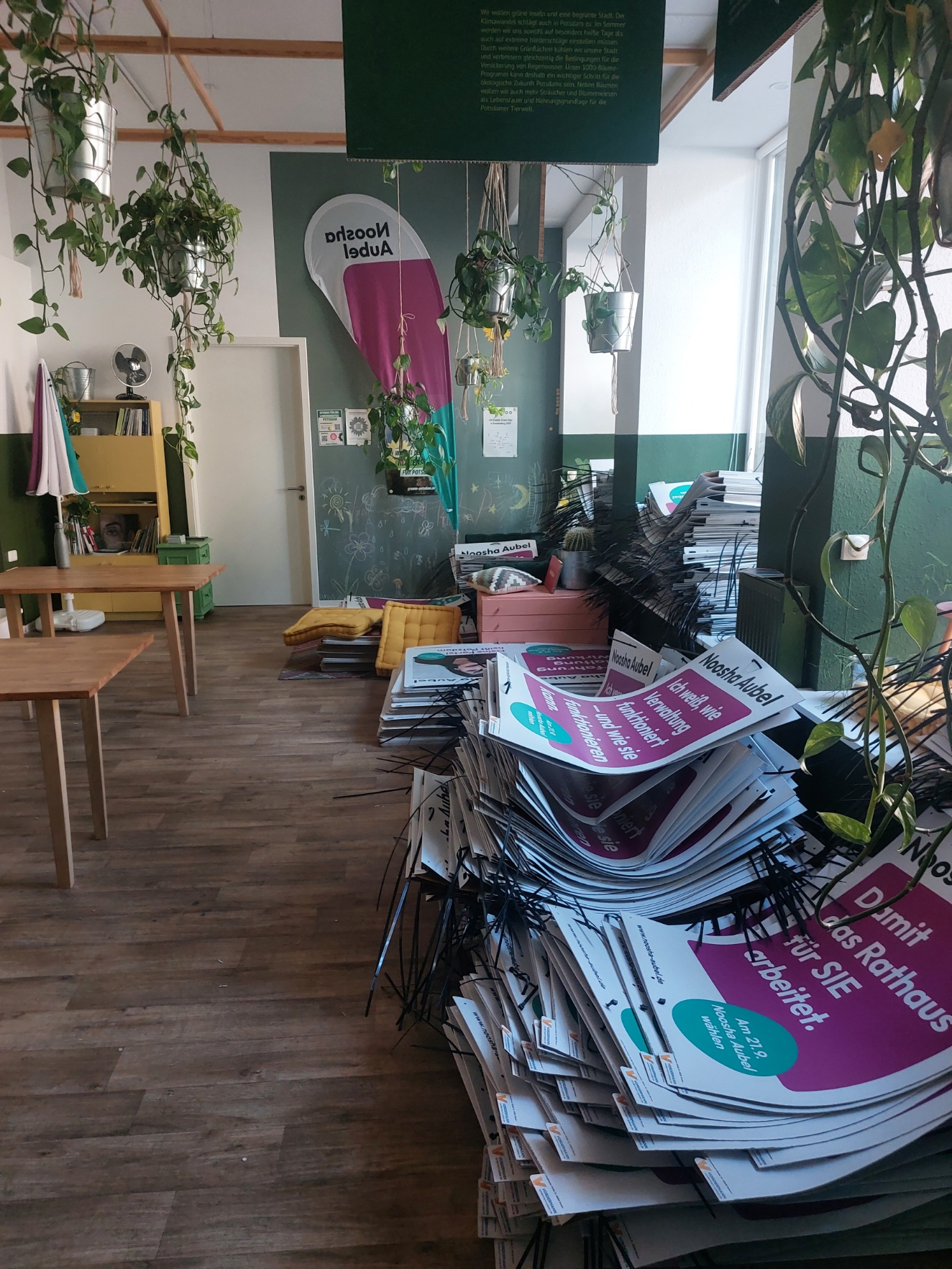
Preparation of election posters for candidate Noosha Aubel for mayor of the city of Potsdam in the 2025 election campaign

In Germany, “disruptors” are additional stickers (usually highlighted in color) attached to the actual posters, which are often attached diagonally in the corners of the poster. These stickers visually disrupt the overall impression and draw attention to an additional message. For example, they can be used to change the message of the poster shortly before the election. They also offer the opportunity to react to changes at short notice. Typical statements from disruptors are “Go vote!” or “Both votes for party XY.” After the election, a disruptor sticker is often attached saying “Thank you for your trust,” with which the party thanks its voters for their support.

== Shapes and materials ==
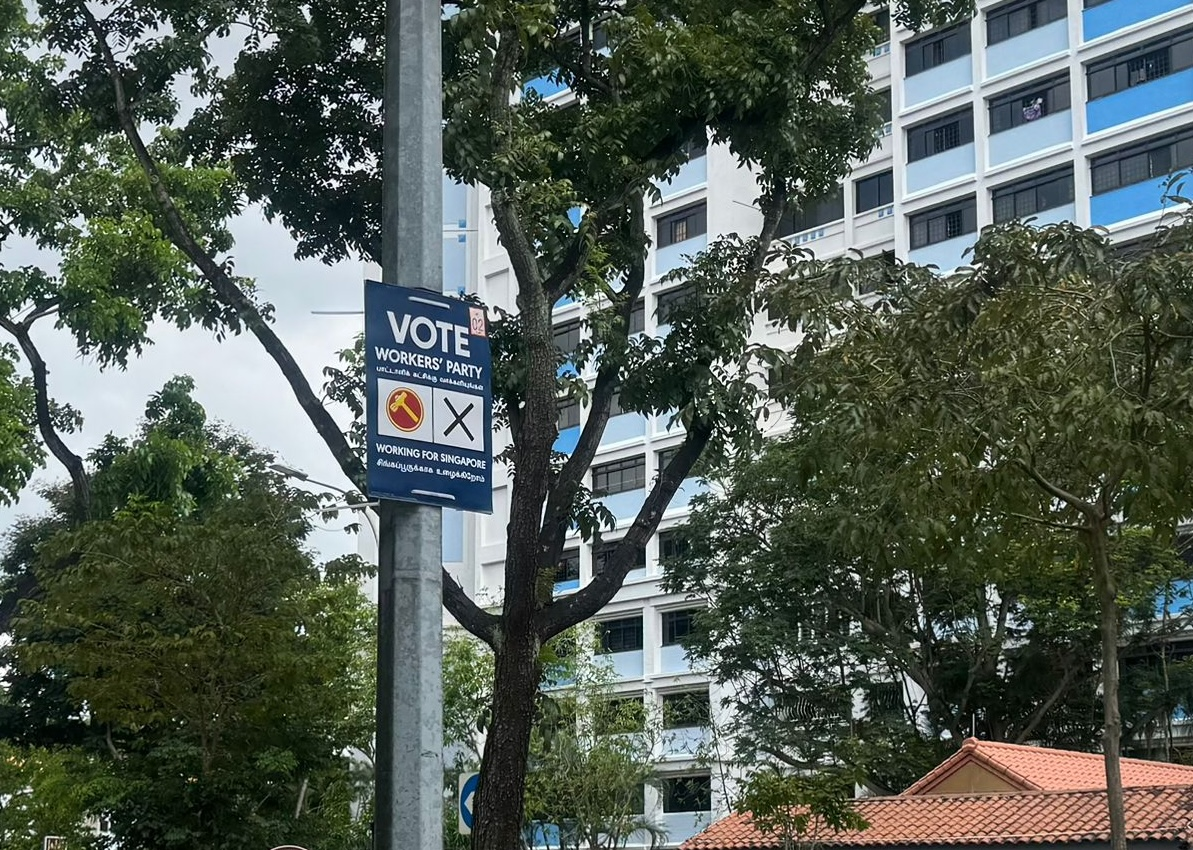
This Workers' Party poster in the 2025 Singaporean general election is attached to a pole.

Traditionally, campaign posters are made of paper, usually in A1 or A2 format, glued to hardboard and attached to poles, or in A0 or A1 format, glued to poster stands. These poster stands are usually boards with two slatted feet or triangular stands composed of three such elements, and are placed around lampposts or other poles.

Since the mid-1990s, polypropylene hollow-wall posters have also been increasingly used. These consist of weatherproof multi-wall sheets (hollow-wall sheets) that can be printed directly, eliminating the need to glue paper posters to the substrate. The printed sheets can then be attached to poles, for example, with cable ties.

Klaus Staeck is considered one of the most distinguished poster artists in Germany.

== Vandalism ==
Election posters are repeatedly damaged or removed by third parties. Often, scribbles are found that distort the image of people depicted or alter party slogans. So-called "election poster vandalism" is an increasingly widespread phenomenon. Legally, it is classified as damage to property or theft of another's property and can be prosecuted by the police.

== Legality ==
Placing posters in public spaces requires a special use permit. The permit procedure is intended to ensure that the responsible authority is informed of the location, duration, and extent of the postering, so that it can prevent or keep any foreseeable disruptions within reasonable limits and reconcile the different and sometimes conflicting usage intentions of road users.

The importance of elections for a democratic state and for political parties limits the discretion of the authorities when deciding on the permission for parties to put up election posters so severely that, as a rule, a party is entitled to a permit. Visual advertising for elections is "today one of the means of election campaigns for political parties" and has "become an important component of election preparation in today's democracy". Another aspect is the equal opportunity for parties required by the constitution. Selective approval for individual parties is not permitted.

Some municipalities have begun banning free-standing postering and, in return, providing political parties with areas for postering, as shown. These posters are removed by the municipality outside of the election campaign so that they do not disrupt the local landscape.

The distribution of photographs of election campaign posters with portraits, regardless of which party is subject to these restrictions in Germany, is not subject to the freedom of panorama under German copyright law and current case law (as of 2021), as these are not permanent. Therefore, they may not be distributed and published without the consent of the author and photographer, nor made accessible to the public in the image.

In the 2024 United Kingdom general election, there were reports of fake election posters designed to spread misinformation.

== Examples ==
- Barack Obama "Hope" poster, used for the 2008 United States presidential election
- 2008 Austrian legislative election campaign posters, used for the 2008 Austrian legislative election
- Breaking Point (UKIP poster), used for the 2016 United Kingdom European Union membership referendum
