= Anglo-American loan =

Loan from the US to the UK after World War II

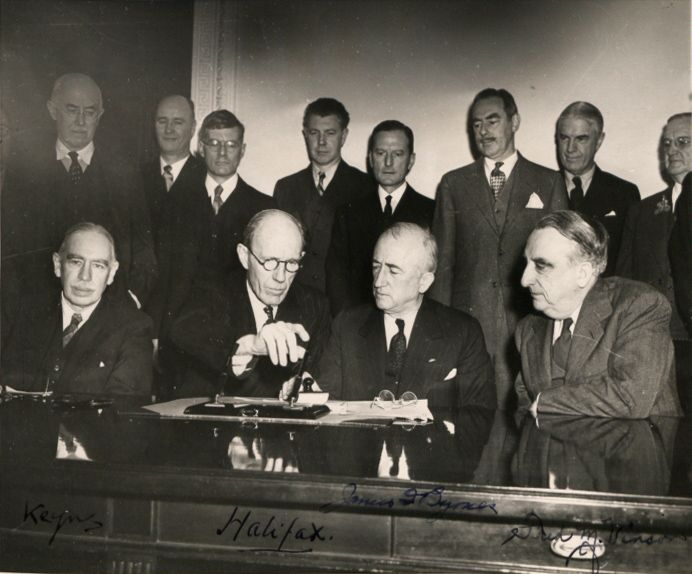
Signature of the loan. Bottom row from left: economist John Maynard Keynes, leader of the British negotiators; Lord Halifax, British Ambassador to the US; James F. Byrnes, United States Secretary of State; and Fred M. Vinson, United States Secretary of the Treasury. Future US Secretary of State Dean Acheson stands third from right in the back row.

The Anglo-American loan, officially the Anglo-American Loan Agreement, was made to the United Kingdom by the United States on 15 July 1946. The loan helped keep the British economy afloat after the Second World War. The British economist John Maynard Keynes and American diplomat William L. Clayton negotiated the deal.

Problems arose on the American side, with many members of Congress reluctant to approve the agreement and with sharp differences emerging between the Treasury and State Departments. The loan US$3.75 billion (£2.2 billion) (equivalent to $61.91 billion in 2025) at a low interest rate of 2 per cent; Canada loaned US$1.19 billion (£607 million) (equivalent to $19.65 billion in 2025).

In 1947, the British economy was shaken by a provision requiring the convertibility into U.S. dollars of wartime sterling balances that Britain had borrowed from India and other countries. By 1948, the Marshall Plan provided financial assistance that was not expected to be repaid. Repayment of the loan was completed in 2006, after being extended by six years.

== Background ==
At the start of the war, Britain spent much of its available funds on payments for materiel under the U.S. cash-and-carry scheme. Basing rights were also exchanged for equipment, such as in the Destroyers for Bases Agreement, but by 1941 Britain was no longer able to finance cash payments, and Lend-Lease was introduced. The Lend-Lease Act provided aid free of charge on the basis that such assistance was essential for the defence of the United States. Congress passed the final extension of the act on 16 April 1945, extending the aid for another year while adding an amendment stating that no aid could be provided for postwar relief or reconstruction.

Large quantities of goods were in Britain or in transit when the Lend-Lease Act was terminated on 21 August 1945. The British economy had been heavily geared toward war production, constituting 55% of GDP in 1944, and had drastically reduced its exports. The United Kingdom therefore relied on Lend-Lease imports to obtain essential consumer commodities such as food, while it could no longer afford to pay for these items using export profits. The end of Lend-Lease consequently came as a major economic shock. Britain needed to retain some of this equipment in the immediate postwar period, leading to the Anglo-American loan agreement. Lend-Lease items retained by Britain were sold at the discounted price of approximately 10 cents on the dollar, giving them an initial value of £1.075 billion.

== Agreement ==
=== Terms ===
John Maynard Keynes, then in poor health and shortly before his death, was sent by the United Kingdom to the United States and Canada to obtain more funds. British politicians expected that in view of the United Kingdom's contribution to the war effort, especially for the lives lost before the United States entered the war in 1941, America would offer favourable terms. Britain was offered a loan at 2% interest to be paid over 50 years starting in 1950 by Canada and the United States.

Historian Alan Sked has commented that, "the U.S. didn't seem to realize that Britain was bankrupt", and that the loan was "denounced in the House of Lords, but in the end the country had no choice." America offered US$3.75 billion (equivalent to $61.91 billion in 2025) and Canada contributed another US$1.19 bn (worth US$21 billion in 2025), both at the rate of 2% annual interest. The amount repaid, including interest, was $7.5bn (£3.8bn) to the US and US$2bn (£1bn) to Canada.

The loan was made subject to conditions, the most damaging of which was the convertibility of sterling. Though not the intention, the effect of convertibility was to worsen British post-war economic problems. International sterling balances became convertible one year after the loan was ratified, on 15 July 1947. Within a month, nations with sterling balances (for example, pounds they had earned from selling goods or services to Britain, or otherwise acquired through loans or remittances, and which they were permitted to sell to Britain in exchange for dollars) had drawn almost a billion dollars from British dollar reserves, forcing the British government to suspend convertibility and to begin immediate drastic cuts in domestic and overseas expenditure. The rapid loss of dollar reserves also highlighted the weakness of sterling, which was devalued in 1949 from $4.02 to $2.80.

In later years, the term of 2% interest was rather less than the prevailing market interest rates, resulting in it being described as a "very advantageous loan" by members of the British government, as elaborated below.

=== Loan spending ===
Much of the loan had been earmarked for foreign military spending to maintain the United Kingdom's empire and payments to British allies prior to its passage, which had been concealed in negotiations through to the summer of 1946. Keynes had noted that a failure to pass the loan agreement would cause Britain to abandon its military outposts in the Middle Eastern, Asian and Mediterranean regions, as the alternative of reducing British standards of living was politically unfeasible.

=== Repayment ===
The last payments were made on 29 December 2006 for the sum of about $83m USD (£45.5m) to the United States, and about $23.6m USD (£12m) to Canada; the 29th was chosen as it was the last working day of the year. The final payments were made six years late, the British Government having suspended them in 1956, 1957, 1964, 1965, 1968 and 1976 because the exchange rates were seen as impractical. After the final payments, Britain's Economic Secretary to the Treasury, Ed Balls, noted: "We honour our commitments to [Canada and the United States] now as they honoured their commitments to us all those years ago."

== See also ==
- Economic history of the United Kingdom
- Postwar Britain (1945–1979)

== Sources ==
- Block, Fred (1977). The Origins of International Economic Disorder. Berkeley, Calif.: University of California Press. pp. 32–69. ISBN 0520037294.
- Callaway, C. Darden. The Anglo-American Loan of 1946: US Economic Opportunism and the Start of the Cold War (2014)
- Clarke, Sir Richard (1982). Cairncross, Sir Alec (ed.). Anglo-American economic collaboration in war and peace, 1942–1949 (1982 ed.). Clarendon Press. ISBN 978-0198284390 – via archive.org.
- Epstein, Rafael (3 January 2007), "UK pays off WWII debt to US", AM (radio broadcast transcript), Australian Broadcasting Corporation
- Gardner, Richard N. Sterling-Dollar Diplomacy in Current Perspective: The Origins and the Prospects of Our International Economic Order (1980)
- Grant Jr., Philip A. "President Harry S. Truman and the British Loan Act of 1946," Presidential Studies Quarterly, (1995) 25#3 pp 489–496 online
- Kindleberger, Charles P. (2006). A Financial History of Western Europe (2006 ed.). Taylor & Francis. ISBN 978-0415378673.
- Rosenson, Alex (March 1947). "The Terms of the Anglo-American Financial Agreement". The American Economic Review. 37 (1): 178–187. JSTOR 1802868.
- Skidelsky, Robert. John Maynard Keynes. Vol. 3: Fighting for Freedom, 1937–1946 (2001) pp. 403–58
- Thornton, Philip (29 December 2006). "Britain pays off final instalment of US loan – after 61 years". The Independent. Archived from the original on 12 July 2010.
- Wevill, Richard. Britain and America after World War II: Bilateral Relations and the Beginnings of the Cold War (I.B. Tauris, 2012)
- The Collected Writings of John Maynard Keynes, Volumes 24 (London: Macmillan Press, 1979)
- International Herald Tribune (28 December 2006). "Britain to make its final payment on World War II loan from US". The New York Times.
- Rohrer, Finlo (10 May 2006). "What's a little debt between friends?". BBC News. Archived from the original on 10 June 2010.
- "The NHS: A 70-year-old Mistake?". History Play. A+E Networks UK.
