= Slovenian border barrier =

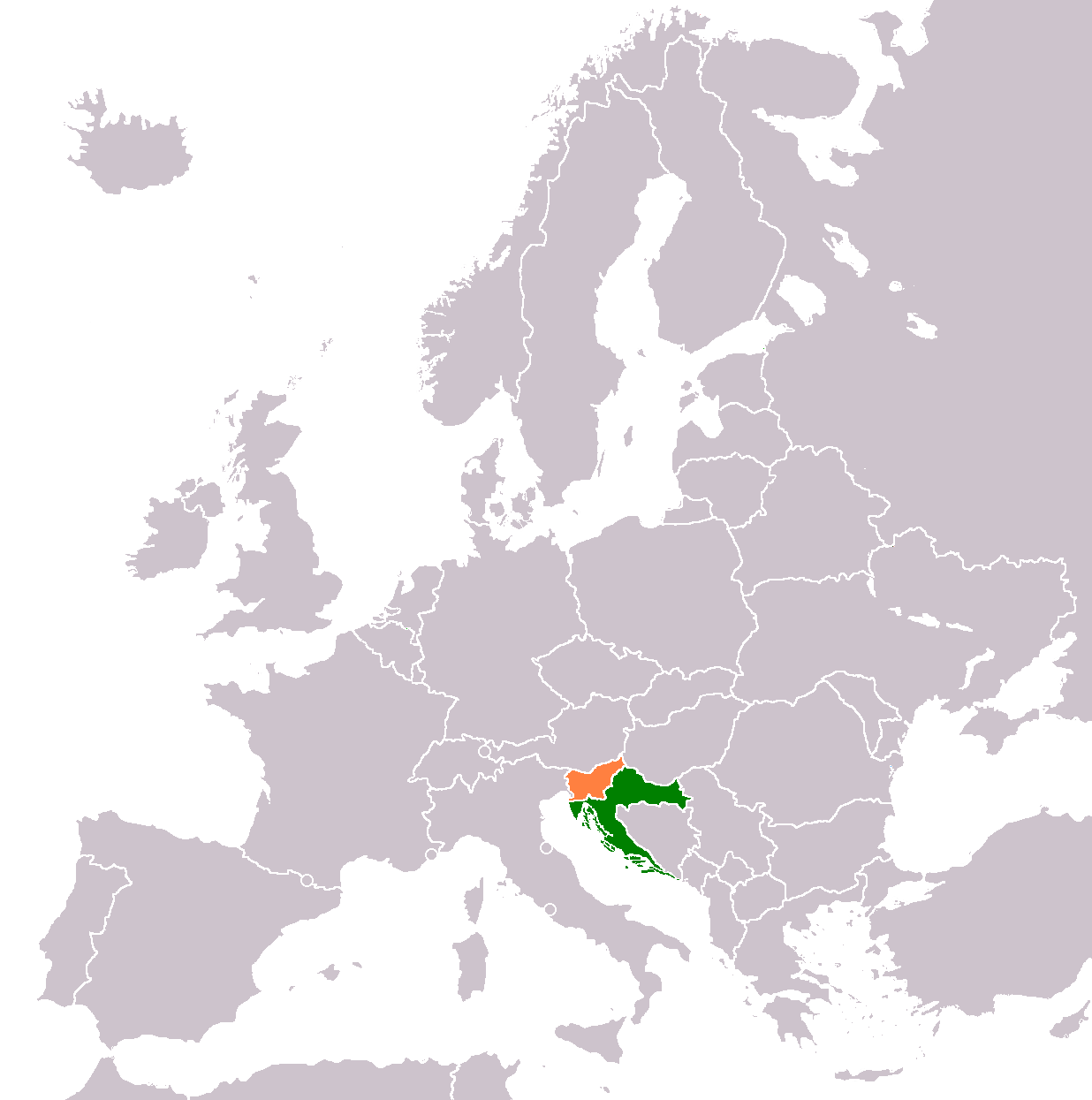
Slovenia Croatia

The Slovenian border barrier was a border barrier constructed by Slovenia in 2015–2016 on its border with Croatia as a response to the European migrant crisis. Both Slovenia and Croatia are European Union members, therefore the barrier was located on an internal EU border; but previously only Slovenia was a member of the free travel Schengen Area, with Croatia joining the area in 2023. In March 2016, Slovenia announced that only migrants who apply for asylum in Slovenia and those with clear humanitarian needs will be allowed to enter Slovenian territory.

== History ==
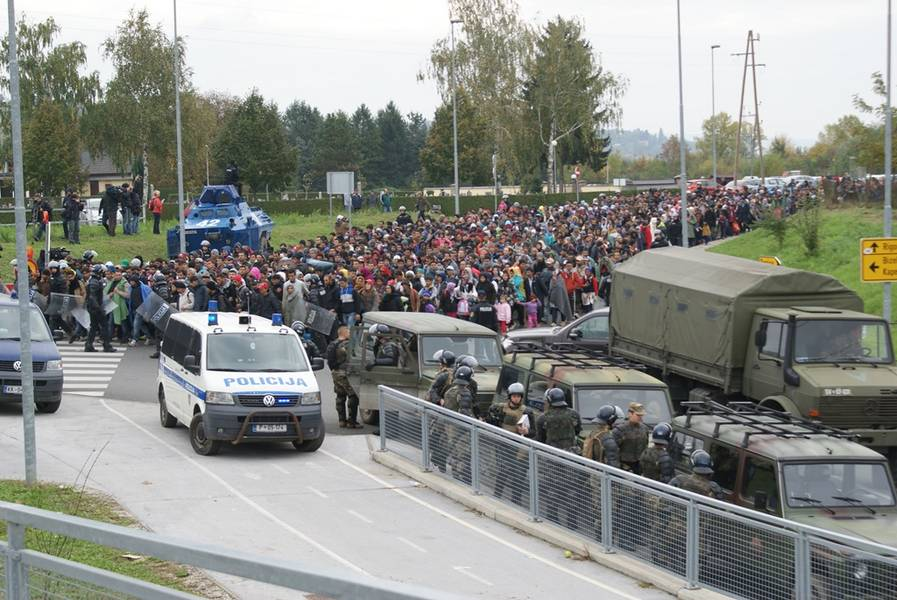
Border crisis situation in October 2015

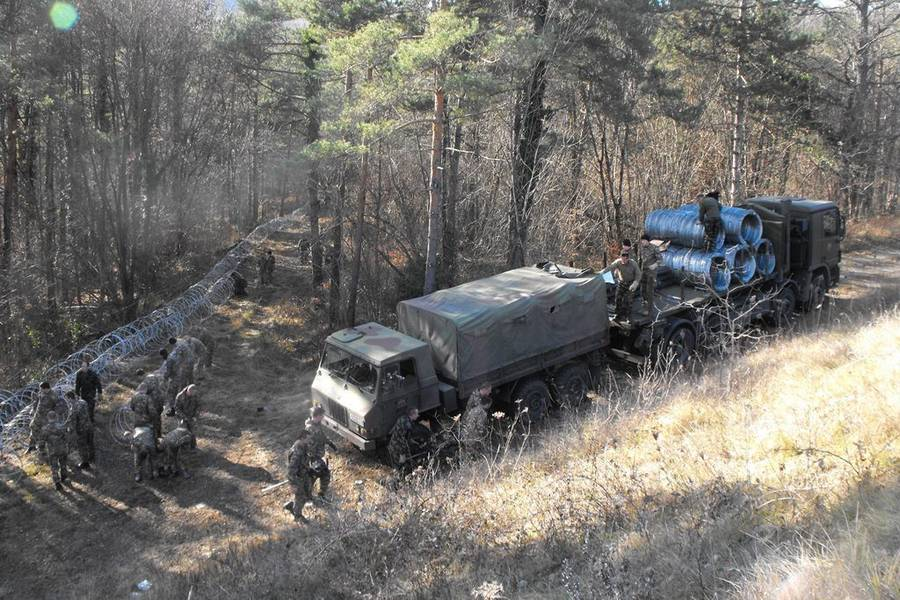
Slovenian army constructing the fence

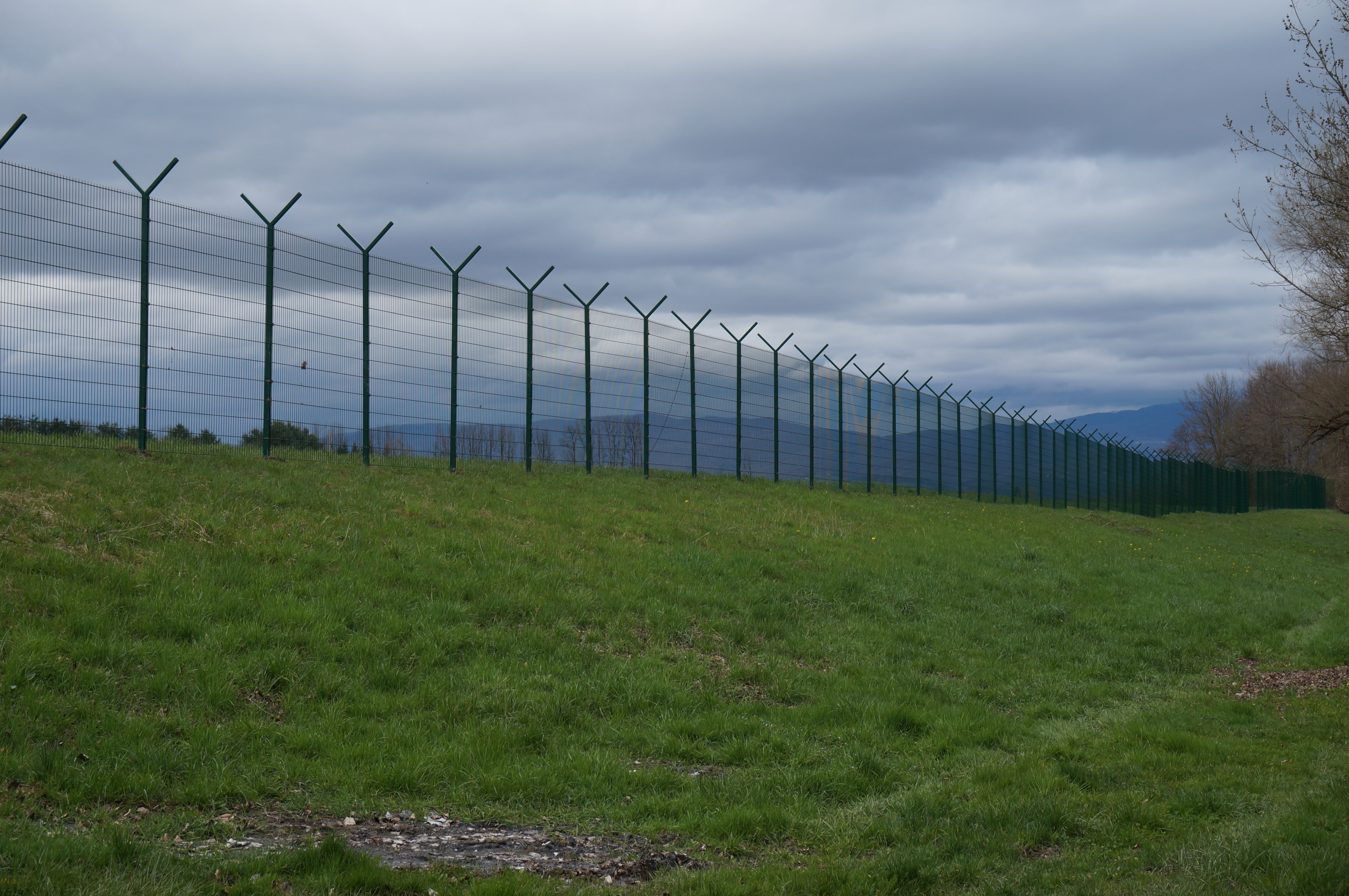
Border fence at the river Kolpa

The 643 km border between Slovenia and Croatia formed the southeastern border of the Schengen Area, the passport-free zone shared by members states of the European Union. Hundreds of thousands of migrants have attempted to enter the Schengen Area in 2015, with over 171,000 of refugees of the wars in Afghanistan and Syria crossing into Slovenia from Croatia since Hungary closed its border on 16 October 2015.

In November 2015, Slovenia started construction of the barrier consisting of razor wire. The stated aim of the barrier was to control the flow of refugees and migrants while keeping the border open. This move could potentially divert the flow of immigrants to cross into the Schengen Area through Albania and Italy.

In March 2016, Slovenia barred migrants from transiting through its territory and announced that only migrants who apply for asylum in Slovenia and those with clear humanitarian needs will be allowed to enter Slovenian territory. In reaction, Serbia announced closure of its borders with Macedonia and Bulgaria to migrants without valid documents.

As of January 1, 2023, some barriers dividing Croatia and Slovenia have been removed due to Croatia's accession to the Schengen Area.

== Environmental impact ==
Croatia complained to the EU that the Slovenian fence is an obstacle for migration of wildlife such as deer and that "Slovenia is violating European legislation on the conservation of natural habitats and the environment". The razor-wire fence laid by Slovenia in December 2015 on the border with western Croatian regions of Istria and Gorski kotar endangers the habitat of the wolf and the brown bear, both of which are protected by law in Croatia. Local hunters have found deer killed by the fence. The WWF and the inhabitants of the regions from both sides of the border have protested against the decision to put up the razor-wire fence.

== See also ==
- Austrian border barrier
- Bulgarian border barrier
- Greek border barrier
- Hungarian border barrier
- Macedonian border barrier
- Norway–Russia border barrier
- Croatia–Slovenia relations
- Croatia–Slovenia border disputes
- Breaking Point (UKIP poster)
