= Labour Isn't Working =

UK political advertising campaign

"Labour Isn't Working" was an advertising campaign in the United Kingdom. It was run by the Conservative Party in 1978 in anticipation that Labour Party Prime Minister James Callaghan would call a general election. It was revived for the general election campaign the next year, after the government lost a vote of no confidence in the wake of the Winter of Discontent. It was designed by advertising agency Saatchi & Saatchi.

== History ==
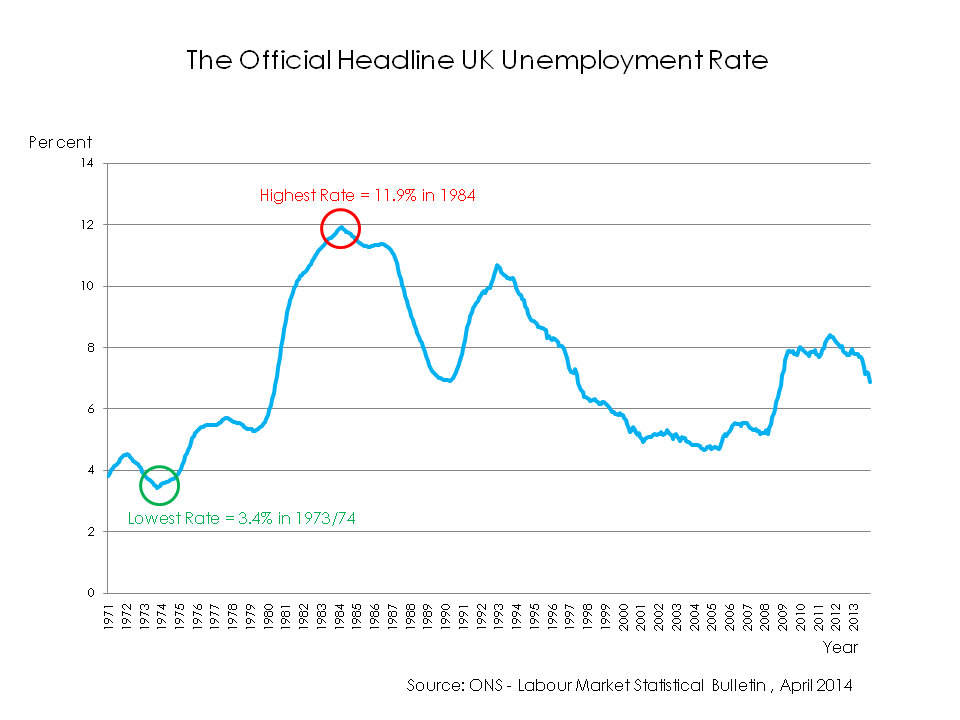
The Unemployment Rate in the United Kingdom from 1971 to 2014

In 1978, unemployment was high by post-war UK standards with 1.6 million unemployed, between 5 and 6% (though the unemployment rate has remained at or above these levels for most of the UK's subsequent history).

The poster's design was a picture of a snaking dole queue outside of an unemployment office. Above it was the slogan "Labour isn't working" with the phrase "Britain's better off with the Conservatives" in a smaller text below.

The picture in the poster originally planned for 100 extras to be used for the picture. However, only 20 volunteers from the Hendon Young Conservatives turned up to be photographed. The desired effect was achieved by photographing the same people repeatedly and then striping them together.

The picture was used in the 1979 election campaign with the slogan "Labour still isn't working." Peter Thorneycroft, Conservative Party treasurer, claimed that the advertisement had "won the election" for the Conservatives.

== Reception ==
The way the photo was taken was leaked and Labour's Denis Healey criticised it in the House of Commons, saying the people in it were not genuinely unemployed and said that the Conservatives were "selling politics like soap-powder".

The campaign was a success as it was viewed as backing up the Conservatives' claims against Labour. In May 1979, the Conservatives won the election with a 43-seat majority with the party leader, Margaret Thatcher becoming Prime Minister. Conservative Party treasurer, Lord Thorneycroft claimed that the poster won the election for the Conservatives. In 1999, Campaign voted the poster as the "Best Poster of the Century".

== Later re-uses ==
The poster was considered popular; similar versions of it have been released in later years in the UK. In October 2012, the Conservatives used "Labour isn't learning" in a poster in preparation for the next general election and in March 2012 UK Uncut used "austerity isn't working" and recreated the picture outside Downing Street on Budget Day.

During the 2012 United States presidential election, the Republican Party used a copy of the poster, using the slogan "Obama isn't working" instead of "Labour isn't working".

In December 2013, Church Action on Poverty launched a campaign "Britain isn't eating", using a modified version with the queue leading to a Food Bank.

In the 2015 UK General Election campaign, the Labour Party unveiled a very similar poster, this time highlighting A&E waiting times, with the headline "The Doctor Can't See You Now." and subtitled "The Tories Have Made It Harder To See A GP".

The idea was used by UKIP in its campaign in the 2016 London mayoral election, where the intended message was against mass immigration, with a poster titled "Open Door Immigration Isn't Working", subtitled "London's Population Is Growing By One Million Every Decade". UKIP used the idea again in the 2016 United Kingdom European Union membership referendum, when a poster titled "Breaking Point" with the subtitle "The EU has failed us all" showed a long, snaking line of refugees waiting to come into the country.

In 2020, the Daily Mirror ran the headline "Tories Aren't Testing", pairing it with a photo of a COVID-19 testing queue in London.

In 2023, the Socialist Party of Great Britain ran an image saying "Capitalism isn't working". In 2023 BAME professionals non-profit People Like Us also ran adverts saying "People like us are working. But getting paid less." to call for ethnicity pay gap reporting.

Ahead of the 2024 United Kingdom General Election, Reform UK published a similar image titled "Immigration Isn't Working" while the Labour Party also used it to attack the record of the Conservative Party on access to dentistry.

At 2025 Labour Party conference trans rights campaigners Trans+ Solidarity Alliance ran an advert titled "Labour isn't working for LGBT+ voters" over the party's handling of the fallout of the For Women Scotland Ltd v The Scottish Ministers case. At the same time, Oxfam also ran adverts saying "Inaction isn't working" to call for a ceasefire in Gaza.

== See also ==
- "It's The Sun Wot Won It"
