= Breaking Point (poster) =

Poster by the UK Independence Party

UKIP Breaking Point poster

"Breaking Point" is a campaign poster released on 16 June 2016, during the final week of campaigning before the Brexit referendum. The poster was released by Nigel Farage of the UK Independence Party and was part of a £100,000 campaign from Family Advertising Ltd, an advertising firm based in Edinburgh. It depicted a photograph of Syrian refugees near the Croatia-Slovenia border in 2015, with the caption "breaking point" and "the EU has failed us all".

The poster was denounced by left- and right-wing politicians, and several media outlets highlighted the poster's similarity to propaganda in Nazi Germany. The same photograph was later used by the Hungarian Fidesz party in another poster during the build up to the 2018 Hungarian parliamentary election.

== Poster design and unveiling ==
The photograph, which takes up the entire billboard, was taken in October 2015 near the Croatia-Slovenia border by Getty Images photographer Jeff Mitchell, and depicts a large group of predominantly adult male Syrian and Afghan refugees, almost all of whom had dark skin, who were being taken to the Brežice refugee camp, escorted by Slovenian police. There is one prominent white person visible in the original photograph; this person is covered by a box of text on the poster. In the photo, the people follow a path between two fields from its top left to its central foreground. UKIP purchased a commercial licence from Getty Images to use the image.

The photograph is captioned with the words "breaking point" in large red block capitals, above "the EU has failed us all" in smaller white text. It also features a lower bar with the text "we must break free of the EU and take back control of our borders", with a white box with the text "leave the European Union on 23 June" and a cross in a box in the bottom right corner.

Nigel Farage, then leader of the UK Independence Party, unveiled the poster in June 2016 in Westminster, during the final week before the 2016 United Kingdom European Union membership referendum. It was placed to take up an entire side of a Leave.EU campaign van.

== Reactions ==
=== Immediate reactions ===
The poster was condemned by politicians campaigning against Brexit. Then Scottish National Party leader Nicola Sturgeon stated that it was "disgusting", and Labour Party MP Yvette Cooper said "just when you thought leave campaigners couldn’t stoop any lower, they are now exploiting the misery of the Syrian refugee crisis in the most dishonest and immoral way." The Green Party's Caroline Lucas said that "using the innocent victims of a human tragedy for political propaganda is utterly disgusting. Farage is engaging in the politics of the gutter." Dave Prentis of the Unison trade union said he had written to the Metropolitan Police to complain of the poster, stating that it was a "blatant attempt to incite racial hatred" and that "to pretend that migration to the UK is only about people who are not white is to peddle the racism that has no place in a modern, caring society".

Right-wing politicians also distanced themselves from the poster. Boris Johnson distanced the official Vote Leave campaign from UKIP after the reveal, stating that it was "not our campaign" and "not my politics". On The Andrew Marr Show, then justice secretary Michael Gove said that "when I saw that poster I shuddered. I thought it was the wrong thing to do. I am pro-migration but I believe that the way in which we secure public support for the continued benefits that migration brings and the way in which we secure public support for helping refugees in need is if people feel they can control the numbers overall coming here." Similarly, George Osborne said that "there is a difference between addressing those concerns in a reasonable way and whipping up concerns, whipping up division, making baseless assertions that millions of people are going to come into the country in the next couple of years from Turkey, saying that dead bodies are going to wash up on the beaches of Kent, or indeed putting up that disgusting and vile poster that Nigel Farage did, which had echoes of literature used in the 1930s." Conservative MP Neil Carmichael said that it was "disappointing to see UKIP jumping on the refugee crisis to further their own political aims. Britain can only deal with the issue of immigration by working together with European countries that face the same challenges." Former UKIP MP Douglas Carswell called the poster "morally indefensible".

Jonathan Jones of The Guardian stated that the poster was "the visual equivalent of Enoch Powell’s 'rivers of blood' speech," also comparing its visual language of a snaking queue to that of the unemployed people in the Conservatives' 1979 Labour Isn't Working poster. Twitter users also made comparisons to Nazi propaganda footage of Jewish refugees, later shown in the 2005 BBC documentary Auschwitz: The Nazis and 'The Final Solution'. When Indy100 reported these comparisons, UKIP responded that they "utterly reject the association, and would like to point out that Godwin's law applies here."

Getty Images made a statement on the matter that "it is always uncomfortable when an objective news photograph is used to deliver any political message or subjective agenda. However, the image in question has been licensed legitimately". Jeff Mitchell, who took the photograph, told The Guardian that its use by UKIP was "unfortunate".

When challenged, Farage stated that the poster was "accurate" and "undoctored", and that Angela Merkel's migration policies concerning people who crossed the Mediterranean had made the EU "less safe". He responded to Michael Gove on ITV's Peston, stating that the Vote Leave campaign had also created "very strong" posters concerning immigration, and later stated in an appearance on Sky News that the poster was only the campaign's message for "one day", and that other adverts would be used later. He also stated in an interview that the poster "was not about Britain", but that "it was about Schengen, about the fact Schengen is breaking".

=== After the Brexit referendum ===
In July 2016, an online petition signed by nearly 40,000 people asked police to investigate whether the poster was "systematically and purposefully designed to incite and stir up fear and intolerance of immigrants in order to procure votes", and claimed that the spike in hate crime following the referendum was "a direct consequence" of UKIP's rhetoric during its campaign.

In late 2017 in an interview with the New Statesman, Farage stated that "Jacob [Rees-Mogg] says he thinks that poster won the referendum, because it dominated the debate for the last few days. The establishment hated it, the posh boys at Vote Leave hated it, but it was the right thing to do. Now, I don’t think we’d have won the referendum without Mrs Merkel. But that poster reminded people what Mrs Merkel had done." In May 2019 on The Andrew Marr Show, Farage defended the use of the poster by UKIP but said that it would not be used by his Brexit Party because "immigration isn't the burning issue of the time".

== Hungarian use of the photograph ==
The same photograph was used in an anti-immigration advertisement by the Hungarian Fidesz party, published on 26 March 2018, during the Hungarian parliamentary election. This poster added a large red stop sign graphic over the photograph, obscured the presence of the white man in the photograph, and additionally cropped out the only woman visible in the original photograph. On social media, it came with a caption stating that "The government's information campaign on the migration starts into its new phase. The government wants to highlight the fact that the UN's migration guidelines would allow more immigration. We think that immigration poses a serious risk, therefore it must be stopped. The advertisements in this topic will run until the 15th of April."

== Academic analysis ==
Simon Faulkner, Hannah Guy and Farida Vis note that the combination of the image and text in the poster "displaced the meaning of the photograph from being about the movement of a specific group of refugees in Slovenia [...] to being about the purported effect of EU border policies on immigration into the UK. This shift in meaning also involved a shift in the function of the image from being a standard example of photojournalism (and therefore primarily valued for its documentary content) to a political concern to use the image to emphasise connotations of racialised otherness in relation to immigration." They stated that the photograph allowed both UKIP and Fidesz to express a "racially charged message" while "allowing them a degree of deniability" as they did not need to articulate the ideas explicitly. They also noted that the UKIP poster was less "direct" and "univocal" compared to the Fidesz poster, and suggested that the "breaking point" slogan referred to a "duality", representing both the 'breaking' of the EU and UK borders.

Giorgia Aiello in the Journal of Visual Political Communication expanded on this, noting that "from a strictly political point of view," the poster "was not 'effective' – unlike the 'Vote Leave' campaign’s NHS bus". Andrew Reid in Ethical Theory and Moral Practice concluded that the poster warranted a non-criminal sanction from institutions like the Electoral Commission, unlike the bus decal which promised "£350 million" for the NHS, because "it belongs to a category of hateful speech that propagates false and discriminatory beliefs about its targets".

Oliver Sykes, in the journal Space and Polity, put forward that the poster, alongside other posters at the time including Vote Leave's 'Countries set to join the EU' and 'What the EU “tourist deal” means' posters, "construct[ed] a spatial imaginary of the openness of the UK to 'others' from 'other places', and notably 'openness to the East'." Henk van Houtum and Rodrigo Bueno Lacy argued in Fennia that, by "contextual association" with the 2015 European migrant crisis, the poster "promote[d] anxiety" about immigrants, specifically "asylum seekers from Muslim-majority countries."
