= Adrift: Seventy-six Days Lost at Sea =

1986 memoir by Steven Callahan

Adrift: Seventy-six Days Lost At Sea
- Cover
- Author: Steven Callahan
- Language: English
- Genre: Nonfiction, Memoir
- Publisher: Houghton Mifflin Harcourt
- Publication date: December 31, 1986
- ISBN: 9785551418429

Adrift: Seventy-six Days Lost At Sea is a 1986 memoir by Steven Callahan about his survival alone in a life raft in the Atlantic Ocean, which lasted 76 days.

== Sailing ==
Callahan departed Newport, Rhode Island, United States, in 1981 on the Napoleon Solo, a 6.5-meter (21.3-foot) sloop he designed and built himself, single-handedly sailed the boat to Bermuda, and continued the voyage to England with friend Jorden Bridges. He had left Cornwall that fall, bound for Antigua as part of the Mini Transat 6.50 single-handed sailing race from Penzance, England, but dropped out of the race in La Coruña, Spain. Bad weather had sunk several boats in the fleet and damaged many others including the Napoleon Solo. Callahan made repairs and continued voyaging down the coast of Spain and Portugal, out to Madeira and the Canaries. He departed El Hierro in the Canary Islands on January 29, 1982, still headed for Antigua. On February 5, in a growing gale, when he was seven days out, his vessel was badly holed by an unknown object during a night storm, and became swamped, although it did not sink outright due to the watertight compartments Callahan had designed into the boat. In his book, Callahan writes that he suspects the damage occurred from a collision with a whale.

== Sinking ==
Unable to stay aboard Napoleon Solo as it filled with water and was overwhelmed by breaking seas, Callahan escaped into a six-person Avon inflatable life raft, measuring about six feet across. He stood off in the raft but managed to get back aboard several times to dive below and retrieve a piece of cushion, a sleeping bag, and an emergency kit containing, among other things, some food, navigation charts, a short spear gun, flares, flashlight, solar stills for producing drinking water, and a copy of Sea Survival, a survival manual written by Dougal Robertson, a fellow ocean survivor. Before dawn, a big breaking sea parted the life raft from the Napoleon Solo, and Callahan drifted away.

== Adrift ==
The raft drifted westward with the South Equatorial Current and the trade winds. After exhausting the meagre food supplies he had salvaged from the sinking sloop, Callahan survived by "learning to live like an aquatic caveman". He ate primarily mahi-mahi as well as triggerfish, which he speared, along with flying fish, barnacles, and birds that he captured. The sea life was all part of an ecosystem that evolved and followed him for 1,800 nautical miles (3,300 km) across the ocean. He collected drinking water from two solar stills and various improvised devices for collecting rainwater, which together produced on average just over a pint of water per day. There was a third solar still; however, because the stills he had were an early World War II prototype without supplied instructions, Callahan had to cut and destroy one of the stills to reverse-engineer how they worked. Nevertheless, these stills surely saved Callahan's life.

Callahan's use of a radio beacon and many flares did not trigger a rescue. EPIRBs were not monitored by satellites at the time, and he was in a part of the ocean that was too isolated for the signal to be heard by aircraft. Additionally, ships did not spot his flares. While adrift, he spotted nine ships, most in the two sea lanes he crossed; however, from the beginning, Callahan knew that he could not rely upon rescue but instead must, for an undetermined time, rely upon himself and maintaining a shipboard routine for survival. He routinely exercised, navigated, prioritized problems, made repairs, fished, improved systems, and built food and water stocks for emergencies.

== Rescue ==
On the eve of April 20, 1982, he spotted lights on the island of Marie Galante, southeast of Guadeloupe. The next day, on Callahan's 76th day afloat in the raft, fishermen picked him up just offshore, drawn to him by birds hovering over the raft, which were attracted by the ecosystem that had developed around it. During the ordeal, he faced sharks, raft punctures, equipment deterioration, physical deterioration, and mental stress. Having lost a third of his weight and covered with scores of saltwater sores, he was taken to a local hospital for an afternoon, but he left that evening and spent the following weeks recovering on the island and while hitchhiking on boats up through the West Indies.

== Aftermath ==
During his journey, Callahan experienced a few positive elements aside from suffering, describing the night sky at one point as "a view of heaven from a seat in hell". He still enjoys sailing and the sea, which he calls the world's greatest wilderness. Since his survival drift, he's made dozens of additional offshore passages and ocean crossings, most of them with no more than two other crew.

This incident is featured on the I Shouldn't Be Alive episode "76 Days Adrift". Callahan's story also featured on an episode of British survival expert Ray Mears's television series Extreme Survival.

In 2024, the book was made into the feature documentary, 76 Days Adrift, executive produced by Ang Lee and Steven Callahan and directed by Joe Wein.

== See also ==
- Dougal Robertson, Scottish author and sailor who, with his family, survived being adrift at sea after their schooner was holed by killer whales in 1972.
- Maurice and Maralyn Bailey, survived 117 days adrift in the Pacific Ocean.
- Rose Noelle, a trimaran on which four people survived 119 days adrift in the South Pacific.
- Poon Lim, who survived for 133 days adrift in the Atlantic.
- José Salvador Alvarenga, who survived 438 days adrift in the Pacific Ocean.
- Essex, a whaler stoved by a whale out from the Galápagos Islands. (Moby Dick is based on this event.)
