= Steven Callahan =

American sailor and writer (born 1952)

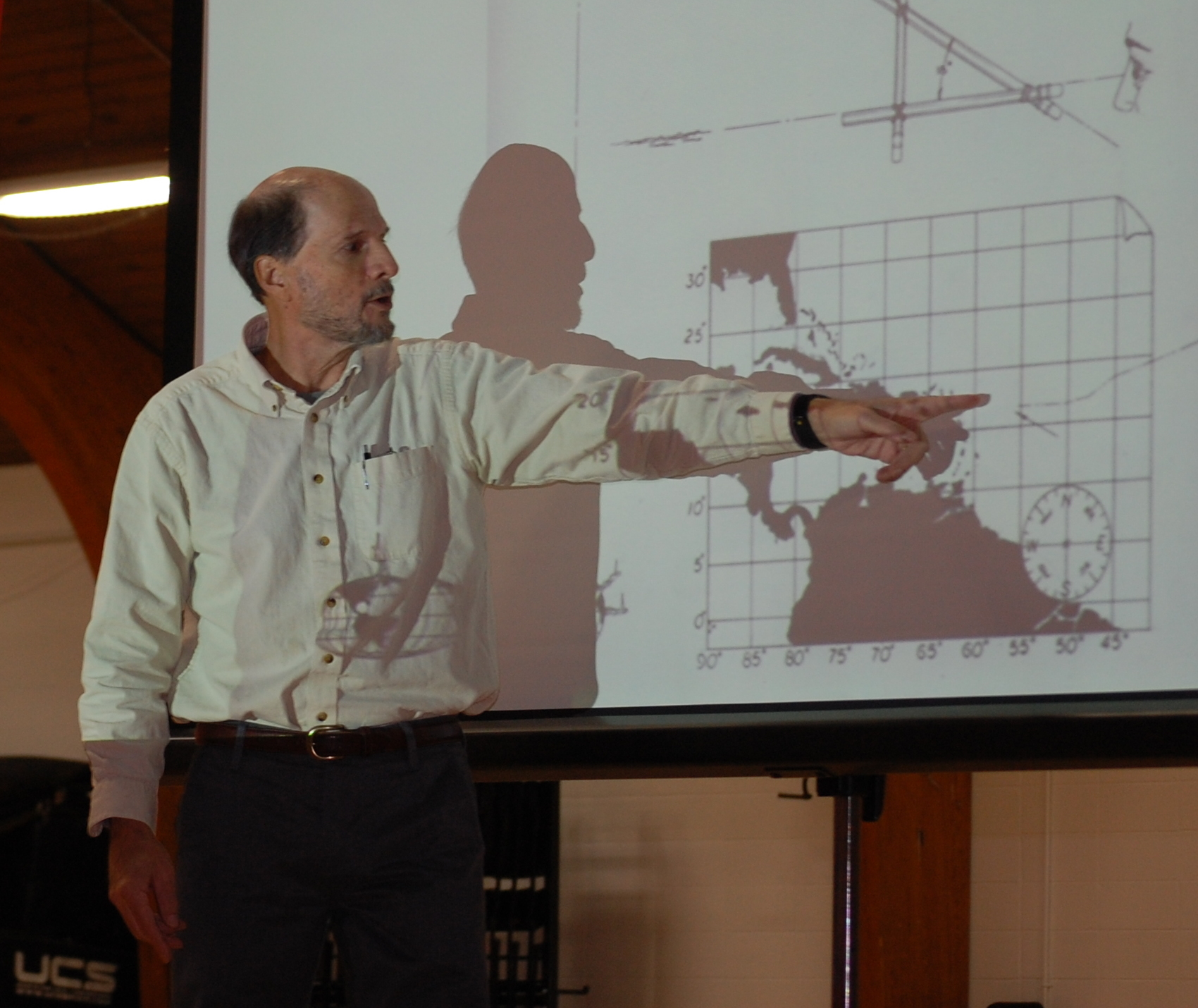
- Callahan describes his experience of being adrift to students at North Yarmouth Academy in 2016
- Born: February 6, 1952 (age 74); California
- Occupations: Author, naval architect, inventor, and sailor
- Known for: Surviving for 76 days adrift on the Atlantic Ocean; Adrift: Seventy-six Days Lost at Sea

Steven Callahan (born February 6, 1952) is an American author, naval architect, inventor, and sailor. In 1981, he survived for 76 days adrift on the Atlantic Ocean in a liferaft. Callahan recounted his ordeal in the best-selling book Adrift: Seventy-six Days Lost at Sea (1986), which was on The New York Times best-seller list for more than 36 weeks.

== Biography ==
He holds three U.S. patents: a drogue-like boat stability and directional-control device (Patent No. 6684808); a folding rigid-inflatable boat (FRIB) (Patent No. 6367404); and a folding rigid-bottom boat (FRB) (Patent No. 6739278). The initial model FRIB, called "The Clam", was developed on the basis of his survival experience. The Clam is a multifunction self-rescue dinghy, designed for use as a proactive lifeboat (as well as a yacht tender) that allows the sailor to sail to safety.

Callahan asserts that "It certainly would be nice to have a completely different kind of raft now, what the French call a "Dynamic" raft, meaning the thing sails. The last time I lost my boat, had I been able to beam reach, I could have shortened my drift from 1,800 miles to 450; had I been able to sail even dead downwind but increase speed to a moderate 2.5 knots, I would have been afloat 25 days rather than 76; had I been able to do both I would have sailed to safety in a mere 6 or 7 days."

== Adrift: Seventy-six Days Lost at Sea ==
Callahan departed from Newport, Rhode Island, United States, in 1981 on the Napoleon Solo, a 6.5-metre (21 ft) sloop he designed and built himself, single-handedly sailed the boat to Bermuda, and continued the voyage to England with friend Chris Latchem. He had left Cornwall that autumn, bound for Antigua as part of the Mini Transat 6.50 single-handed sailing race from Penzance, England, but dropped out of the race in La Coruña, Spain. Bad weather had sunk several boats in the fleet and damaged many others, including Napoleon Solo. Callahan made repairs and continued voyaging down the coast of Spain and Portugal, out to Madeira and the Canaries. He departed from El Hierro in the Canary Islands on January 29, 1982, still headed for Antigua. In a growing gale, seven days out, his vessel was badly holed by an unknown object during a night storm, and became swamped, although it did not sink outright due to watertight compartments Callahan had designed into the boat. In his book, Callahan writes that he suspects the damage occurred from a collision with a whale.

Unable to stay aboard Napoleon Solo as it filled with water and was overwhelmed by breaking seas, Callahan escaped into a six-man Avon inflatable life raft, measuring about six feet (1.8 m) across. He stood off in the raft, but managed to get back aboard several times to dive below and retrieve a piece of cushion, a sleeping bag, and an emergency kit containing, among other things, some food, navigation charts, a short spear gun, flares, torch, 3 solar stills for producing drinking water and a copy of Sea Survival, a survival manual written by Dougal Robertson, a fellow ocean survivor. Before dawn, a big breaking sea parted the life raft from Napoleon Solo and Callahan drifted away.

The raft drifted westward with the South Equatorial Current and the trade winds. After exhausting the meager food supplies he had salvaged from the sinking sloop, Callahan survived by catching food. He mainly ate mahi-mahi, as well as triggerfish, which he speared, along with flying fish, barnacles, and birds that he captured. The sea life was all part of an ecosystem that evolved around his raft and followed him for 1,800 nautical miles (3,300 km) across the ocean. He collected drinking water from two solar stills (the third of which he had cut open in order to know how to use them) and various jury-rigged devices for collecting rainwater, which together produced on average just over a pint of water per day.

Callahan's use of an EPIRB (emergency position-indicating radio beacon) and many flares did not trigger a rescue. EPIRBs were not monitored by satellites at the time, and he was in too empty a part of the ocean to be heard by aircraft. Ships did not spot his flares. While adrift, he spotted nine ships, most in the two sea lanes he crossed, but from the beginning, Callahan knew that he could not rely upon rescue but instead must, for an undetermined time, rely upon himself and maintaining a shipboard routine for survival. He routinely exercised, navigated, prioritized problems, made repairs, fished, improved systems, and built food and water stocks for emergencies.

On the eve of April 20, 1982, he spotted lights on the island of Marie Galante, south east of Guadeloupe. The next day, on Callahan's 76th day afloat in the raft, fishermen picked him up just offshore, drawn to him by birds hovering over the raft, which were attracted by the ecosystem that had developed around it. During the ordeal, he faced sharks, raft punctures, equipment deterioration, physical deterioration, and mental stress. Having lost a third of his weight and being covered with scores of saltwater sores, he was taken to a local hospital and spent six weeks recovering.

During his journey, Callahan experienced a few positive elements aside from suffering, describing the night sky at one point as "A view of heaven from a seat in hell." He still enjoys sailing and the sea, which he calls the world's greatest wilderness. Since his survival drift, he's made dozens of additional offshore passages and ocean crossings, most of them with no more than two other crew.

This incident is featured on the I Shouldn't Be Alive episode "76 Days Adrift". Callahan's story also featured on an episode of British survival expert Ray Mears's television series Extreme Survival, and on an episode of the History Channel series Vanishings!.

== Life of Pi ==
In the making of the 2012 movie Life of Pi, director Ang Lee asked Callahan to be a consultant on living aboard a life raft. Ang Lee told Callahan, "I want to make the ocean a real character in this movie." Callahan made lures and other tools seen in the movie.

== See also ==
- Dougal Robertson, survived 38 days adrift in the Pacific
- Jesús Vidaña, survived nine months adrift in the Pacific
- Maurice and Maralyn Bailey, survived 117 days adrift in the Pacific
- Rose-Noëlle, a trimaran on which four people survived 119 days adrift in the South Pacific
- Poon Lim, who survived for 133 days adrift in the Atlantic
- José Salvador Alvarenga, who spent 15 months (438 days) adrift in the Pacific

General

- List of people who disappeared mysteriously at sea
