= Dougal Robertson =

Scottish author and sailor (1924–1991)

- Born: 29 January 1924; Edinburgh, Scotland
- Died: 22 September 1991 (aged 67); Scotland
- Occupations: Author, sailor
- Known for: Surviving being adrift at sea with family members

Dougal Robertson (29 January 1924 – 22 September 1991) was a Scottish author and sailor who with his family survived being adrift at sea after their schooner was holed by a pod of orcas in 1972, one of the few documented orca attacks in the Pacific.

== Early life ==
Robertson was born in Edinburgh, Scotland in 1924, the youngest of eight children. He joined the British Merchant Navy after attending Leith Nautical College. He left maritime life after the attack on the SS Sagaing at Trincomalee in Sri Lanka in 1942, during which his wife Jessie and his son Duncan were killed. Robertson remarried Linda (Lyn) Poyser, a nurse, and began work as a dairy farmer.

== Voyage ==
On 27 January 1971, Robertson departed from Falmouth, Cornwall, on board the Lucette, a 43-foot (13 m) wooden schooner built in 1922, which the family had purchased in Malta with their life's savings. He was accompanied by his wife, Lyn, daughter, Anne, son Douglas and twin sons, Neil and Sandy. Over the next year and a half they sailed across the Atlantic, stopping at various ports in the Caribbean. Anne retired from the voyage in the Bahamas.

During their transit of the Panama Canal the family members took aboard an inexperienced crew member named Robin Williams, who accompanied them on the next stage of their voyage to the Galápagos Islands and beyond to the islands of the South Pacific.

On 15 June 1972 Lucette was holed by a pod of orcas and sank approximately 200 miles west of the Galapagos Islands. The group of six people on board escaped to an inflatable life raft and a solid-hull dinghy with little in the way of tools or provisions.

Using the dinghy as a towboat powered by a jury-rigged sail, the group made their way towards the doldrums. They got water from their boat before heading away from their old boat. But running out of water, hoping to find rain there so they could collect drinking water, they sailed on. When they ran out of water they started drinking turtle blood. They did so successfully, while catching turtles, dorado and flying fish to eat. They also ate fruit, bread and biscuits that they had grabbed from the boat. The inflatable raft became unusable after 16 days so the six people crowded into the three-metre- (10') long dinghy with their supplies. They then continued to use the wind and current to their advantage, moving northeast towards Central America.

By their 38th day as castaways they had stored dried meat and fresh water in such quantities that they intended to begin rowing that night to speed their progress. However they were sighted and picked up that day by the Japanese fishing trawler Tokamaru II on her way to the Panama Canal. Robertson, who had been keeping a journal in case they were rescued, recounted the ordeal in the 1973 book Survive the Savage Sea, on which the 1991 film of the same name was based.

The story was revisited in his son Douglas' book The Last Voyage of the Lucette.

== Death ==
Dougal later wrote Sea Survival: A Manual, and continued to sail until his death from cancer in 1991. The manual was used to help save the life of Steven Callahan, who was stranded for 76 days in the Atlantic Ocean in 1981.

== Aftermath ==
- Lyn kept running the dairy farm.
- Douglas joined the merchant navy and later became an accountant.

== See also ==
- Steven Callahan, survived 76 days adrift in the Atlantic Ocean.
- Maurice and Maralyn Bailey, survived 117 days adrift in the Pacific Ocean.
- Jesús Vidaña and two other Mexican fishermen who survived in the Pacific Ocean for approximately 9 months from October 2005 to August 2006
- Rose-Noëlle, trimaran on which four people survived 119 days adrift in the South Pacific
- Poon Lim, who survived for 133 days adrift in the Atlantic
- Essex, a whaler holed by a whale out from the Galápagos Islands
- José Salvador Alvarenga, who spent 438 days drifting in a small open boat from Mexico to the Marshall Islands
- List of people who disappeared mysteriously at sea
