= Avon Inflatables =

English manufacturer of inflatable boats

Avon Inflatables, Ltd
- Industry: inflatable boats
- Founded: 1959, England
- Parent: Zodiac Milpro

Avon Inflatables, Ltd was a manufacturer of inflatable boats, RIBs and marine safety equipment. The company was based in Dafen, near the town of Llanelli in Carmarthenshire, Wales, and supplied the leisure, commercial and military markets.

== History ==
The company was founded in 1959 in the town of Bradford on Avon in the English county of Wiltshire, and moved to its current location in the 1960s. During the 1990's the hulls were built in Cowes on the Isle of Wight, initially under license by Galt Composites & later as part of Avon Inflatables.

Until 1994, Avon Inflatables formed part of Avon Rubber, but the business was then sold and now operates independently of its former parent. Since 1998, the company has been a division of the French company Zodiac Marine & Pool before being taken over by the Zodiac Group's Military and Professional division, which in 2012 became an independent company named Zodiac Milpro.

In 2019, Avon launched an electric jet-drive tender. The dinghy is powered by a battery from the BMW i3 car and was developed in partnership with Torqeedo, owned by Deutz AG.

== Avon and survival at sea ==
There are numerous accounts of survival at sea involving Avon equipment.

- The Perfect Storm describes the use of Avon inflatable rafts under extreme conditions.
- Steven Callahan survived adrift for 76 days. In a 1983 letter to Cruising World, Callahan said “I must express my appreciation to Avon, who built a good product that did it's [sic] job for 76 days.”
- Two sailors survived 13 days at sea in their Avon raft after abandoning ship in a 1981 incident.
- Avon cites a 117-day survival.
