= Poon Lim =

Record-holder for surviving 133 days on a raft in the South Atlantic Ocean

- Born: 8 March 1918; Wenchang County, Hainan, Republic of China
- Died: 4 January 1991 (aged 72); Brooklyn, New York, U.S.
- Military career
- Allegiance: United Kingdom
- Branch: Merchant Navy
- Ship: Benlomond
- Known for: Survived for 133 days in a life raft at sea as a castaway
- Awards: British Empire Medal

Poon Lim BEM (Chinese: 潘濂; pinyin: Pān Lián; 8 March 1918 – 4 January 1991) was a Chinese seafarer. In 1942–43, he survived a record 133 days alone on a life raft in the South Atlantic.

Poon was Second Mess Steward on SS Benlomond, a British cargo ship that the German submarine U-172 sank on 23 November 1942. He survived on an eight-foot (2.4 m) wooden raft with supplies. When the supplies ran low, Poon resorted to fishing, catching seabirds, and rainwater collection.

On 5 April 1943, three Brazilian fishermen rescued Poon as he neared the coast of Brazil, having drifted westward about 750 miles (1,210 km). After Poon returned to the United Kingdom, King George VI awarded him the British Empire Medal. After the Second World War, Poon emigrated to the United States.

== Early life ==
Poon Lim was born to a peasant family in Qishan (Chinese: 岐山), a village part of Gongpo, Wenchang County, Hainan. His father was a travelling martial arts teacher. In 1936, Poon was sent to British Hong Kong, where he was trained as a sailor.

== Shipwreck ==
Approximate voyage of Poon Lim

In 1942 Poon was Second Mess Steward on the Ben Line cargo ship Benlomond, which was en route from Suez to New York via Cape Town and Paramaribo. Her officers were British, but most of her crew was Chinese. Benlomond was capable of about 12 knots (22 km/h). She was defensively armed, but her voyage was unescorted.

On 23 November, U-172 intercepted and hit Benlomond with two torpedoes at position 00.30°N 38.45°W, about 250 miles (400 km) north of the coast of Brazil. Poon, who was in his cabin, took his life jacket and went to his boat station, where two officers and a seaman were trying to launch one of the lifeboats. They had raised the boat off its chocks, and were about to lower it, when Poon was washed overboard. The ship sank within about two minutes of being hit, and Poon was dragged underwater. When he resurfaced, he found only a few planks floating, one of which he used for extra buoyancy.

Poon was spotted by the crew of U-172, but instead of rescuing him, they laughed at him and waved him away. After about two hours in the water, Poon found and boarded a wooden life raft. In the distance he saw another raft, carrying four or five men, who waved to him to join them. Poon thought they were some of the ship's Defensively Equipped Merchant Ship (DEMS) gunners, but Poon had no means to propel his raft, and the two rafts drifted apart.

== Survival ==
The raft was stocked with a can of fresh water containing 10 imperial gallons (45 litres), six boxes of hardtack, 2 pounds (0.9 kg) of chocolate, ten cans of pemmican, five cans of evaporated milk, one bottle of lime juice, and one can of massage oil. It also had flares, two smoke pots, and a flashlight, with which to signal for help.

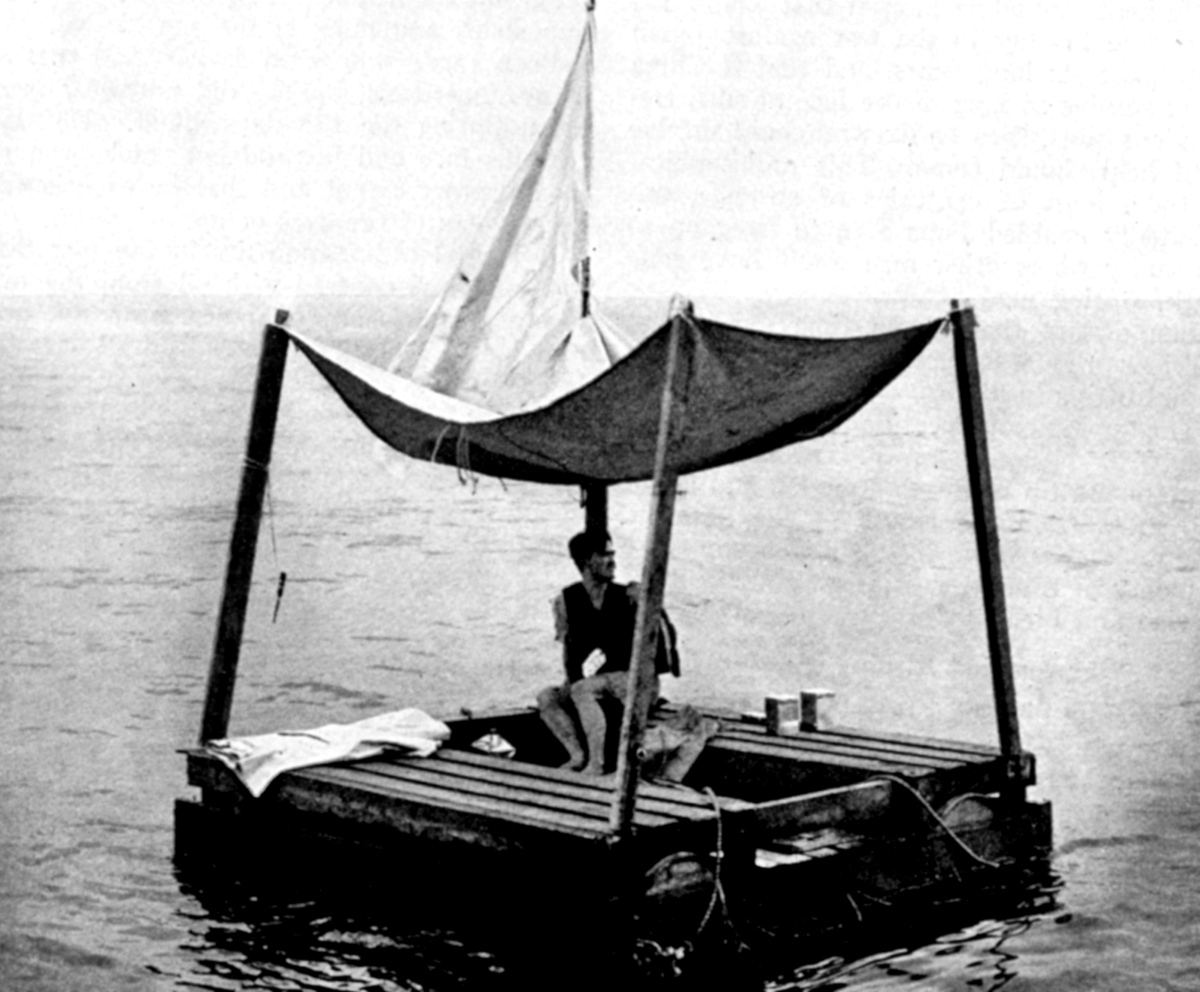
Poon Lim on his raft, in a reconstruction for US Navy survival training

Poon at first kept himself alive by drinking the water and eating the food on the raft. After around 55 days, the food ran out, followed by the water supply fifteen days later. After spending five days without water, Poon resorted to fishing, catching seabirds, and collecting rainwater in a canvas life jacket covering. He could not swim well, and often tied a rope from the boat to his wrist in case he fell into the sea. He took a spring from the flashlight and made it into a fish hook, unravelled hemp rope to make a fishing line, and crushed pieces of hardtack to make bait. He dug a nail from the boards on the wooden raft to make a stronger fish hook. When he caught a small fish, he used it as bait to catch bigger fish. He improvised a knife from part of a pemmican can. The water tank had an iron key, which Poon also used as a tool. When gulls settled on his raft, he caught and killed them. He soaked their meat in seawater to salt it, then dried it on deck to make jerky.

When Poon saw sharks, he caught one, using the remnants of gulls he had caught as bait. Poon had braided his fishing line to double thickness, and had wrapped his hands in canvas to give them a little protection. The shark attacked him after he hauled it aboard the raft, so he used a water container to beat it to death. Poon cut it open and sucked the blood from its liver. This quenched his thirst, since it had not rained and he was out of water. He sliced off the fins and let them dry in the sun.

Poon had lost all of his clothes except his shirt and vest. He made a skirt from a hessian bag that had contained the lime juice bottle. The raft had four poles and a canvas tarpaulin, which he rigged as a canopy. This both protected him from the sun and caught rainwater.

Occasionally, the crews of cargo ships saw him but did not pick him up or even greet him despite his proficient shouts in English. Poon contended that they would not rescue him because he was Asian and they may have assumed he was a stricken Japanese sailor, although another explanation is that German U-boats were rumored to set a "survivor" on a raft as a trap to get a rescuing ship to stop, which made it a sitting duck to be sunk.

Once or twice, United States Navy patrol planes did see him, and one dropped a marker buoy in the water. The plane reported back to US Navy authorities in Belém, Brazil, but a storm hit the area at the same time and he was lost again.

At first, he counted the days by tying knots in a rope, but later decided that there was no point in counting the days and simply began counting full moons.

== Rescue ==
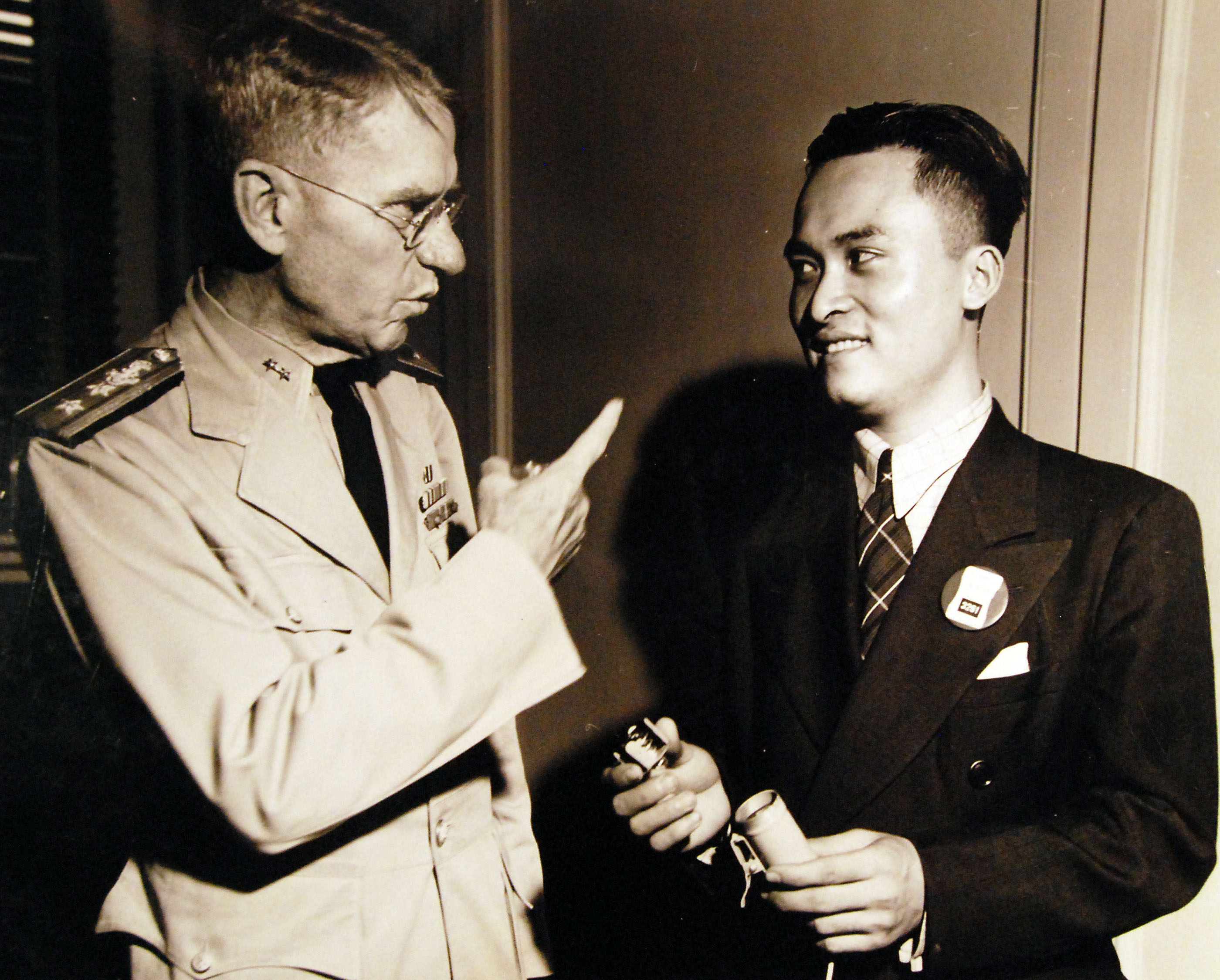
Poon Lim after his rescue, in conversation with Rear Admiral Julius A. Furer

By April 1943, Poon realized that he was nearing land, as the color of the sea was no longer a deep ocean blue. He had drifted westward about 750 miles (1,210 km). On 5 April three Brazilian fishermen found him, about 9 nautical miles (16 km) off the coast of Pará, east of Salinas. He was the sole survivor from Benlomond. Her Master, Captain John Maul had died, along with 43 of her officers and men, and all eight of her gunners.

Poon had lost 20 pounds (9 kg) in weight. He was so weak that his rescuers had to lift him off his raft. But he ate well, and when the fishermen landed him at Belém, three days later, he was able to walk again, although he was still weak.

On 10 April the British Consul in Pará telegraphed a report to the Ministry of War Transport in London, seeking confirmation of the loss of Benlomond. After two weeks in a Brazilian hospital, Poon was fit enough to travel. The Consul arranged for him to go to Britain via Miami and New York.

== Aftermath ==
After being in the hospital for 45 days, Poon left Brazil via plane going to Miami and later New York. At a ceremony at the Seamen's Church Institute of New York and New Jersey in New York on 16 July 1943, the Acting British Consul told Poon that King George VI was to award him the British Empire Medal. His citation states that "Poon Lim displayed exceptional courage, fortitude and resource in overcoming the tremendous difficulties with which he was faced during the long and dangerous voyage on the raft". At the same ceremony, Ben Line presented Poon with a gold wristwatch. The Royal Navy incorporated his tale into manuals of survival techniques.

Poon would end up getting a job for Curtiss-Wright in New Jersey working there until World War II ended in 1945 with the plant closing. When the plant closed he went back to being a sailor, becoming a messman for the United States Lines and worked for them until retiring in 1983 as a Chief Steward.

After the war, Poon wanted to emigrate to the United States, but the quota for Chinese immigrants had been reached. However, because of his fame and the aid of Senator Warren Magnuson, he received a special dispensation and eventually gained citizenship in 1952. Later that year, Poon would marry the daughter of one of his former shipmates aboard the S.S. Tanda, having three daughters and a son together. After becoming a US citizen, Poon was prohibited from returning to his homeland as travel was not permitted to the now People's Republic of China, so he had to ask his parents to meet him in British Hong Kong to visit them. Poon also applied to join the US Navy. His application was declined because he had flat feet. His son George Poon died from cancer on 23 September 2020, aged 58.

Poon surpassed the previous known record of life raft survival of five crewmen of MV Zaandam, also torpedoed by a U-boat, two months before his rescue. When told no one had ever survived longer on a raft at sea, Poon replied, "I hope no one will ever have to break that record." People have since lived longer lost at sea: three Mexican sailors floated for 10 months from 2005 to 2006 in the Pacific Ocean in a disabled fishing boat. In a similar situation, José Salvador Alvarenga, a fisherman from El Salvador, was apparently lost for 439 days, floating from Mexico to the Marshall Islands. As of 2024, no one has broken Poon's record on a life raft.

The writer Alfred Bester later stated that Poon's ordeal was used in his novel The Stars My Destination, which opens with a man stranded in space.

Poon died in Brooklyn, New York, on 4 January 1991, aged 72.

== See also ==
- José Salvador Alvarenga – survived 438 days adrift in the Pacific Ocean
- Maurice and Maralyn Bailey – survived 117 days adrift in the Pacific Ocean
- Cornelis van der Slot, Nicolaas Hoogendam and Basil Izzi – survived 83 days on a raft in the Atlantic Ocean
- Steven Callahan – survived 76 days adrift in the Atlantic Ocean
- Louis Zamperini – survived 47 days adrift in the Pacific Ocean
- Dougal Robertson – survived 38 days adrift in the Pacific Ocean
- List of people who disappeared mysteriously at sea
