= The Bee Sting =

2023 novel by Paul Murray

- Author: Paul Murray
- Language: English
- Publisher: Macmillan Publishers
- Publication date: 2023
- Publication place: Ireland
- Pages: 656
- Awards: An Post Irish Book of the Year (2023)
- ISBN: 978-0-374-60030-3

The Bee Sting is a 2023 novel by Irish writer Paul Murray, published by Macmillan. The book depicts the dysfunctional, hapless lives of the Barnes family of Ireland, with portions of the book dedicated to the lives of each of the four family members. It was shortlisted for the 2023 Booker Prize and won both the An Post Irish Book of the Year award and the Fiction category and overall winner, the Gold Nero, in the inaugural Nero Book Awards.

== Background ==
The Bee Sting is Murray's fourth novel. It took about five years to write. Murray has written about books which inspired The Bee Sting. It was his second book to be nominated for the Booker Prize, following 2010's Skippy Dies.

== Plot ==
The novel recounts the story of the Barnes family, a once powerful and wealthy family in Ireland that faces financial difficulties after the Great Recession. The patriarch of the family, Dickie Barnes, operates a chain of car dealerships and garages that he inherited from his wealthy father Maurice, who now lives in Portugal and has limited contact with the family. Dickie's wife, Imelda, begs Dickie to ask Maurice for money but he refuses, insisting they can fix everything on their own. Rather than dealing with it, however, Dickie turns his attentions to the construction of a "futureproof" bunker with the help of his paranoid, fatalistic survivalist handyman Victor.

Meanwhile, Dickie and Imelda's daughter Cass, once a straight-A student, begins to struggle with the stress of school work and her family's problems, which are becoming the talk of the town. She begins to neglect her school work in favouring of drinking heavily in "the Bunker" and at local pubs with her best friend Elaine, who comes from an equally vain and wealthy family. One night Cass and Elaine meet the mysterious Pole Ryszard who drives them to the so-called "murder house" where a man allegedly killed his entire family and then himself. Unable to find it, they decide to drink and smoke pot and all three kiss one another. When Ryszard implores them to keep kissing, however, they stop and laugh at him and he subsequently abandons them. From that point onwards Cass and Elaine develop an even more toxic, homoerotic friendship. Cass' younger brother PJ is lonely and often bullied by his best "friend" Nev. He makes serious plans to run away to live with his online friend Ethan, whom he has never met in real life. He also becomes increasingly involved with, and worried about, his father's construction of the doomsday bunker.

Dickie's father finally does visit but insists on taking control of the business himself, emasculating Dickie and enraging Imelda. It is revealed through numerous flashbacks that Imelda was actually supposed to marry Dickie's brother Frank, her real true love and the talk of the town, but he died and she subsequently became pregnant with Dickie's child. She tells everyone that she wore a veil throughout her wedding to Dickie because of a bee sting but in reality she was assaulted by her abusive father who left her to fend for herself. It is also revealed that Dickie's first sexual experience was with another man but the encounter turned violent after he accidentally discovered that the man worked for the police. Dickie lies to his family about the abuse, claiming he was hit by a car, and also hides his same-sex relationship with Willie, a college friend of his, from them too. When Frank dies he agrees to take over the family business, marries Imelda and breaks things off with Willie, devastating him. In the present, Imelda is contemplating conducting an affair with Big Mike, Elaine's father, who recently became notorious for cheating on his wife with a Brazilian housemaid. Unbeknownst to Imelda, Dickie is conducting an actual affair with Ryszard, a Polish mechanic who blackmails him with secret recordings of them having sex into giving him thousands of pounds.

Although anticipating academic failure, Cass succeeds at enrolling in Trinity College Dublin with Elaine, where Cass quickly grows tired of Elaine's narcissism and selfishness. After a bad date with a boy, Elaine and Cass nearly kiss again and Cass resolves to declare her true feelings to Elaine once and for all. At a houseparty Elaine throws, however, Cass gets drunk for the first time in a long time and tells Elaine she hates her. PJ gatecrashes the party with his worries about the family and the future. Cass angrily kicks him out but later tracks him down and they ride the bus back home together. Before Cass found him, he attempted to meet up with his online friend Ethan, but ran away when he realised Ethan is actually an elderly man pretending to be a boy his age.

In the final section of the book, Victor convinces Dickie that they must kill Ryszard to protect his family, although Victor darkly suggests that the only way to ensure that they don't see the videos is if he murders them too. Imelda ultimately decides against having an affair with Big Mike, choosing an attempt at reconciliation with her family instead. Imelda, Dickie, Cass, and PJ all arrive at the Bunker although none of them cross paths with one another. Big Mike fights with Ryszard over his Brazilian mistress, whom Ryszard has also been sleeping with and now impregnated; the Brazilian mistress runs away. Believing to have finally spotted Ryszard and deciding the only good path is murdering him, Dickie manically fires into the forest. It is strongly implied that Dickie may have actually killed his entire family instead but the ending is left up to debate.

== Reception ==
Writing for The Guardian, Justine Jordan stated: "This is a sprawling, capacious novel, but expertly foreshadowed and so intricately put together that many throwaway moments only take on resonance on a second reading." She concluded : "You won't read a sadder, truer, funnier novel this year." Writing for The New York Times, Jen Doll stated that Murray's writing is "pure joy - propulsive, insightful and seeding with hilarious observations." Writing for The Los Angeles Times, author Jonathan Russell Clark called the novel "a triumph of realist fiction, a big, sprawling social novel in the vein of Jonathan Franzen’s 'Freedom.'" The review further stated: "The agility with which Murray structures the narrative around the family at its heart is virtuosic and sure-footed, evidence of a writer at the height of his power deftly shifting perspectives, style and syntax to maximize emotional impact. Hilarious and sardonic, heartbreaking and beautiful — there’s just no other way to put it: 'The Bee Sting' is a masterpiece." Ron Charles of The Washington Post said of the novel, "The great miracle of 'The Bee Sting' is the way Murray propels this story forward while simultaneously looping back into the past. Everything that happens feels both spontaneous to the moment and yet determined by a web of tragedies and deceptions that stretches back for decades."

== Awards and honours ==
The Bee Sting was included on the year-end lists of the best books of 2023 published by The New York Times,The New Yorker, Time, and The Washington Post.

Awards for The Bee Sting
Year	Award	Result	Ref.
2023	Booker Prize	Shortlist	
2023	An Post Irish Book of the Year	Winner	
2024	Nero Book Award (Fiction)	Winner	
