= SS Benlomond (1922) =

British merchant ship torpedoed in 1942

History
- Name: 1922: Cynthiana; 1922: Hoosac; 1922: London Corporation; 1937: Marionga J. Goulandris; 1938: Benlomond
- Owner: 1922: Furness, Withy; 1925: Warren Line (Liverpool); 1929: Furness, Withy; 1937: Goulandris Bros; 1938: Ben Line Steamers
- Operator: 1925: Furness, Withy; 1938: W Thomson & Co
- Port of registry: 1922: (United Kingdom) Liverpool; 1922: (United Kingdom) London; 1937: (Greece) Andros; 1938: (United Kingdom) Leith
- Builder: Irvine's, West Hartlepool
- Yard number: 587
- Completed: January 1922
- Identification: UK official number 145913; until 1933: code letters KLQC; 1930–37: call sign GFWM; 1937–38: call sign SVUU; 1938–42: call sign GLGZ
- Fate: sunk by torpedo, 1942

General characteristics
- Type: cargo ship
- Tonnage: 6,629 GRT, 4,153 NRT
- Length: 420.0 ft (128.0 m)
- Beam: 55.0 ft (16.8 m)
- Draught: 29 ft 4 in (8.94 m)
- Depth: 36.3 ft (11.1 m)
- Decks: 2
- Installed power: 705 NHP
- Propulsion: 1 × screw; 1 × triple-expansion engine
- Speed: 12 knots (22 km/h)
- Crew: 45, plus eight DEMS gunners in wartime
- Sensors & processing systems: by 1926: submarine signalling, wireless direction finding; by 1939: echo sounding device
- Armament: DEMS in the Second World War
- Notes: sister ship: Parisiana

SS Benlomond was a British cargo steamship that was built in 1922 as Cynthiana, changed owners and names a number of times, and was sunk by a U-boat in 1942, with the loss of all but one of her 53 ship's company. The sole survivor, Poon Lim, drifted on a raft for 133 days before being rescued.

The ship was built on Teesside for the Furness, Withy shipping group, who changed her name to Hoosac, and then to London Corporation, within her first year. In 1937 the Goulandris brothers bought her, renamed her Marionga J. Goulandris, and registered her in Greece. In 1938 Ben Line Steamers bought her, renamed her Benlomond, and returned her to the British registry.

She was the third Furness, Withy ship to be called Cynthiana, the first to be called Hoosac, and the first to be called London Corporation. She was the fourth Ben Line ship to be called Benlomond.

== Building ==
In 1920–22 Irvine's Shilbuilding and Dry Dock Co, in West Hartlepool on the River Tees, built a pair of sister ships for Furness, Withy. Yard number 586 was launched in September 1920, completed in March 1921, and initially named Parisiana. The date of yard number 587's launch is missing, but she was completed in January 1922 as Cynthiana.

Cynthiana's registered length was 420.0 ft (128.0 m), her beam was 55.0 ft (16.8 m), and her depth was 36.3 ft (11.1 m). Her tonnages were 6,629 GRT and 4,153 NRT. She had a single screw, driven by a three-cylinder triple-expansion steam engine built by Richardsons Westgarth & Company of Hartlepool. It was rated at 705 NHP, and gave her a speed of about 12 knots (22 km/h).

== Name, owners, managers, and identification ==
Furness, Withy registered Cynthiana at Liverpool. Her United Kingdom official number was 145913 and her code letters were KLQC. In February 1922, Furness, Withy renamed her Hoosac and re-registered her in London. In November 1922, Furness, Withy had renamed her again, as London Corporation.

By 1926, Furness Withy had transferred London Corporation to a subsidiary, Warren Line (Liverpool) Ltd, but kept her registered in London. By 1929, ownership had been transferred back to the Furness, Withy parent company.

By 1926 her navigation equipment included submarine signalling and wireless direction finding. By 1930 her wireless telegraphy call sign was GFWM. This superseded her code letters from 1934.

In December 1937 the Goulandris brothers bought London Corporation, renamed her Marionga J. Goulandris, and registered her on the Aegean island of Andros. Her call sign was SVUU.

In May 1938 Ben Line bought Marionga J. Goulandris, renamed her Benlomond, and registered her in Leith. Her call sign was GLGZ. Ben Line had an echo sounding device added to her navigation equipment.

In November 1938, Ben Line bought her sister ship, formerly Parisiana, which since 1923 had been called London Exchange. She was renamed Benrinnes.

== Second World War service ==
Ben Line's main trade was between Britain and the Far East. On 9 September 1939, a week after the Second World War began, Benlomond left The Downs. She went via the Strait of Gibraltar, Suez Canal, Penang and Singapore to Hong Kong, where she was in port from 19 to 25 January 1940. She returned via Ko Sichang, Singapore, the Suez Canal and Gibraltar, where she joined Convoy HG 22. The convoy was bound for Liverpool, but Benlomond detached, and arrived off Southend on 22 March 1940.

In April 1940 Benlomond joined Convoy OA 138GF, which assembled at sea off Southend, departed on 28 April, and became Convoy OG 28F to Gibraltar. On this voyage she went via Dakar, Cape Town, Penang, Singapore and Manila to Hong Kong, where she was in port from 29 June to 10 July. She returned via Manila, Cebu, Singapore, Cape Town and Freetown in Sierra Leone, where she joined Convoy SL 46. The convoy was bound for Liverpool, but Benlomond detached for Oban. From there she joined a series of convoys that took her around the north of Scotland to Methil on the Firth of Forth. She arrived off Southend on 23 March 1941.

In April 1941 joined Convoy EC 7, which assembled off Southend, and departed on 14 April. The convoy was bound for the Firth of Clyde, but Benlomond detached for Middlesbrough. She resumed her voyage with Convoy EC 13, which had left Southend on 28 April. She detached to Loch Ewe. From there she steamed unescorted via Cape Verde, Cape Town, Penang, Singapore and Manila to Hong Kong, where she was in port from 4 to 26 August. This time she returned via Honolulu, the Panama Canal and Halifax, Nova Scotia, where she joined Convoy HX 162. The convoy was bound for Liverpool, but Benlomond detached for the Firth of Clyde, where she arrived on 13 December 1941.

On 30 January 1942 Benlomond left the Clyde and joined Convoy OS 18, which had left Liverpool the same day. OS 18 took her as far as Freetown, whence she continued unescorted via Cape Town, and Bombay to Karachi in British India, where she was in port from 5 to 21 April. She returned via Veraval, Durban, Cape Town and Freetown. There she joined Convoy SL 112, with which she reached Liverpool on 23 June 1942.

On 21 July 1942 Benlomond left Liverpool with Convoy OS 35 to Freetown, where she joined Convoy ST 31, which was headed for Takoradi on the Gold Coast. She detached and continued unescorted via Cape Town and Aden to Suez, where she arrived on 25 September 1942 before going through the Suez Canal to Port Said.

== Loss ==
Benlomond left Port Said in ballast, and on 15 October 1942 she passed Suez. She was bound for New York via Paramaribo in Surinam. She called at Cape Town from 6 to 9 November, and continued unescorted across the South Atlantic.

At 14:10 hrs on 23 November, U-172 hit Benlomond with two torpedoes. She sank within two minutes at position 0°30′N 38°45′W. U-172 surfaced, questioned survivors, and then left.

Benlomond sank too quickly for many of her crew to escape, and no time to launch any of her lifeboats. At least six crew members were alive immediately after she sank. But they were 250 nautical miles (460 km) north of the nearest land, the coast of Brazil. Her Master, Captain John Maul, died, along with 52 of her 53 company.

== Survivor ==
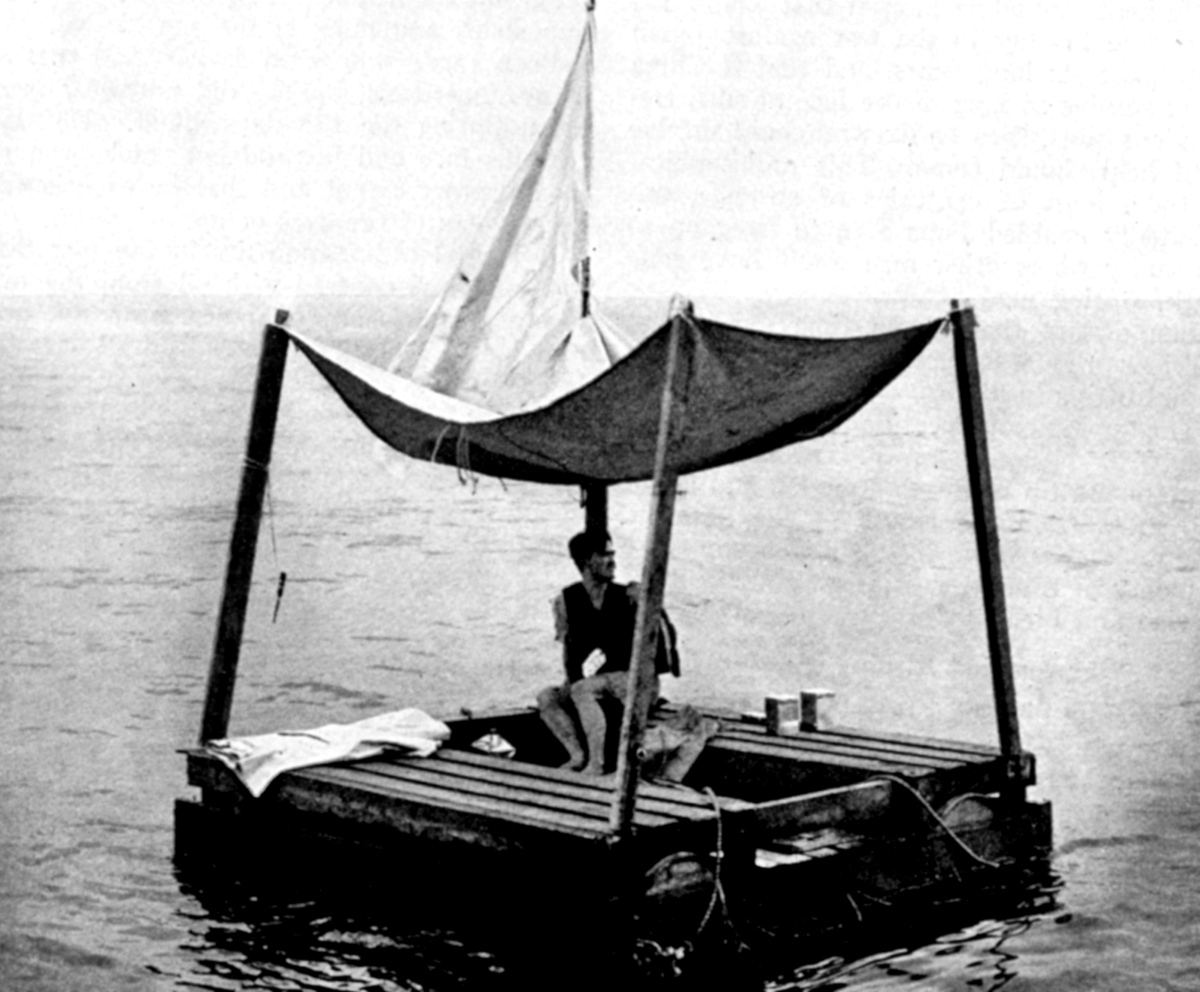
Poon Lim on a liferaft, in a re-enactment for US Navy survival training

After about two hours in the water, the Second Mess Steward, Poon Lim, found and boarded a liferaft that had floated clear from the ship when she sank. He sighted another raft in the distance, with four or five occupants, who waved to him to join them. Lim thought they were some of the ship's DEMS gunners. But Lim had no means to propel his raft, and the two rafts drifted apart.

Lim's raft had enough water and food to last one man about 50 days. He converted the canvas cover of his lifejacket into a canopy to catch rainwater, improvised hooks and a fishing line, used biscuit as bait to catch small fish, used small fish as bait to catch bigger fish, and caught and killed seagulls that alighted on the raft. He improvised a knife from the lid of a pemmican can. He used seawater to salt seagull meat, then dried it on deck to keep as jerky.

Lim drifted for 133 days and about 750 nautical miles (1,390 km), until three Brazilian fishermen in a fishing boat found him on 5 April, about 10 nautical miles (19 km) from the coast. They landed him at Belém on 8 April, where he spent four weeks in hospital. In July 1943 King George VI awarded him the British Empire Medal for his "exceptional courage, fortitude and resource".

== See also ==
- MV Zaandam
