= Maurice and Maralyn Bailey =

British couple who survived 118 days adrift in the Pacific Ocean in 1973

- Born: Maurice Charles Bailey; 22 January 1933; Maralyn Harrison; 24 April 1941
- Occupation: Sailors
- Known for: Surviving for 118 days adrift on the Pacific Ocean

Maurice (22 January 1933 – 15 December 2017) and Maralyn Bailey (24 April 1941 – 2002) were a British married couple who, in 1973, survived for 118 days on a rubber raft in the Pacific Ocean before being rescued.

Maralyn Bailey was born Maralyn Harrison on 24 April 1941 in Nottingham, England. Maralyn and Maurice married on 21 December 1963.

== 117 days adrift ==
Their survival story is known as 117 Days Adrift despite the duration actually being longer (118 days) because initial news reports were wrong and it was decided to keep this name for consistency.

The Baileys' journey began in June 1972 when they left Southampton, England, in their 31-foot (9.4 m) yacht Auralyn. Their intended destination was New Zealand. They passed safely through the Panama Canal in February and were on their way to the Galapagos Islands. At dawn on 4 March 1973, their yacht was struck by a whale and severely damaged. After transferring some supplies to an inflated life raft and dinghy and salvaging some food, a compass, and other supplies, the Baileys watched as Auralyn disappeared beneath the waves. To survive, they collected rainwater and when their meagre food supplies ran out, began eating sea creatures such as turtles, seabirds and fish caught by hand or with safety pins fashioned into hooks. As they drifted in the open Pacific, the couple saw seven ships, but were unable to attract these ships' attention since their signal flares failed and their emergency kit did not contain a signalling mirror. Their life raft began to disintegrate and required frequent reinflation. They read and played card games early in their ordeal, but later the Baileys suffered terribly from malnutrition and friction-induced sores, the latter worsening due to the wet conditions in the raft. They encountered sharks and dolphins and had to endure severe storms.

After drifting some 1,500 miles (2,400 km), the Baileys were rescued by the crew of the South Korean fishing boat Weolmi 306 on 30 June 1973. Sailors on the ship spotted the raft after initially passing it by. The couple was brought aboard in an emaciated state, having lost some 40 pounds (18 kg) apiece and with their legs barely able to support their weight. Weolmi 306 took them to Honolulu, Hawaii.

== Aftermath ==
The Baileys returned to England and wrote 117 Days Adrift, an account of their ordeal published in 1974. The following year, they returned to the sea in their new yacht, Auralyn II.

Following their rescue, the two adopted a vegetarian diet.

Maurice credited Maralyn as the person who gave him the security he needed to face his day to day and was also the person who saved his life on the raft. Maralyn Bailey died in 2002 at the age of 61. Maurice Bailey died in December 2018 at the age of 85.

== Accounts ==
- The Baileys wrote an account of their ordeal entitled 117 Days Adrift (published with the title Staying Alive! in the United States), which was published in 1974 by Adlard Coles Nautical.
- Alvaro Cerezo interviewed Maurice Bailey and wrote an article "117 Days Adrift" about the Baileys' experience, followed up by an eight-minute short film Surviving on a Lifeboat for 117 Days.
- A 2024 book A Marriage at Sea by journalist Sophie Elmhirst, which was the overall winner of the 2024 Nero Book Awards.

== See also ==
- Ambrogio Fogar, survived 74 days adrift in the South Atlantic with Mauro Mancini (died 2 days after the rescue)
- José Salvador Alvarenga, survived 438 days adrift in the Pacific.
- Steven Callahan, survived 76 days adrift in the Atlantic.
- Dougal Robertson, survived 38 days adrift in the Pacific.
- Rose-Noëlle, trimaran on which four people survived 119 days adrift in the South Pacific.
- Poon Lim, who survived for 133 days adrift in the Atlantic.
- List of people who disappeared mysteriously at sea
