= Linda Robertson (castaway) =

British nurse, farmer and castaway (1919–1998)

Lyn Robertson
- Born: Linda Poyser; 1919; Butterton, Staffordshire, England
- Died: 1998 (aged 79); Staffordshire, England
- Occupations: Nurse; midwife; farmer; sailor
- Known for: Survivor of the Lucette shipwreck (1972)
- Spouse: Dougal Robertson
- Children: 4

Linda (Lyn) Robertson (née Poyser) (1919–1998) was a British nurse and yachtswoman who survived 38 days adrift in the Pacific Ocean in 1972 following the loss of the schooner Lucette, which sank after being struck by a pod of orcas. Published accounts of the ordeal, written by her husband Dougal Robertson and eldest son Douglas, credited her medical training, religious faith and practical approach as key to the survival of all six castaways.

== Early life and family ==
Linda was born in Butterton in the Staffordshire Moorlands in 1919. One of nine children, she grew up on a small farm in Swythamley, Staffordshire, UK. From an early age she was expected to help raise her younger siblings, tend to livestock and do housework. The family lived frugally in isolated independence, an upbringing her children later described as contributing to her steadfastness during the 1972 ordeal.

As a child, she was severely burned and helped care for family members suffering illness, including a period when her mother was seriously ill after childbirth. Linda trained as a nurse at Macclesfield General Infirmary 1937-1940, registering as a State Registered Nurse (SRN) in 1940. Shen then trained as a Fever Nurse at Monsall Hospital 1941-1942. Linda then moved to the City Hospital Plymouth where she qualified as a midwife in 1943. She worked for the British Colonial Service, travelling abroad for nursing posts, first to Palestine and later to Hong Kong, where she met her future husband Dougal. She married Dougal following his wartime service and lived on a smallholding in Meerbrook, Staffordshire. There she raised her four children in a remote rural setting on the edge of the Pennines, initially without electricity, telephone or running water. Her son Douglas wrote that she was the "quiet centre" of the family, known for her calm nature and strong Christian faith.

== Voyage ==
In 1970, the Robertsons sold their farm and purchased Lucette, a 43-foot wooden schooner, intending to sail around the world. They crossed the Atlantic to Miami via the Caribbean islands. They then proceeded to Panama, where an additional crew member joined the voyage just before they transited the Panama Canal en route to the Pacific. As the only medically trained adult aboard, Linda oversaw the family’s health and routine during the voyage.

On 15 June 1972, Lucette was struck by a pod of orcas and sank within minutes. During the shipwreck, Linda was briefly believed drowned when her nightdress became tangled in the wreckage, pulling her underwater. She managed to free herself and, with the other five people on board, escaped into an inflatable raft and small glass-fibre dinghy.

== Castaways ==
During the thirty-eight days adrift, Linda acted as the group’s medical caregiver, treating injuries, monitoring dehydration and insisting on daily exercises for the children to prevent muscular atrophy. She also devised an improvised rehydration method using rubber tubing salvaged from the raft, administering enemas which allowed the family to absorb nonpotable water that was otherwise impossible to drink due to contamination. This technique has reportedly since been adopted by the SAS.

Accounts describe Linda praying aloud, encouraging the castaways to sing to keep warm during moments of peril, and making clothes from old raft materials. The survivors later highlighted her influence on group morale.

The family were rescued by the Japanese fishing vessel Toka Maru II on their 38th day adrift.

== Death ==
After her rescue, Linda returned to the Staffordshire Moorlands to bring up her two youngest children. She resumed her midwifery work at St Mary’s Teaching Hospital in Manchester as well as farming a pedigree herd of beef stock in the village of Onecote. In later life she was involved in local politics and travelled until the last year of her life.

She wrote a memoir of the ordeal that she shared with her family but which was not published. She died in 1998 and is remembered in the dedication of her son Douglas’s memoir of the voyage and their survival.

== Bibliography ==
- Robertson, Douglas (2005). The Last Voyage of the Lucette. Woodbridge, Suffolk: Seafarer Books. ISBN 978-1-57409-206-6.
- Robertson, Dougal (1973). Survive the Savage Sea. Elek Books. ISBN 978-0-882-25090-8.
