= Lara Haworth =

English writer and artist

- Born: Lara Claire Haworth; 1983 (age 42–43); Brussels, Belgium
- Education: Goldsmiths, University of London; University of British Columbia
- Partner: Annie Frost Nicholson
- Website: www.larahaworth.com

Lara Claire Haworth (born 1983) is an English writer and artist. Her debut novel Monumenta, commended for the Bridport Prize as a short story, was shortlisted for the McKitterick Prize and a Nero Book Award.

== Early life ==
Haworth was born in Brussels and grew up in South London. She graduated with a Bachelor of Arts (BA) in English and Drama from Goldsmiths, University of London in 2006. She completed a Master of Fine Arts (MFA) at the University of British Columbia in 2010. Later in 2018, Haworth enrolled in the Novel Studio at City, University of London.

== Career ==
Haworth began her career as an artist. Haworth's poem "The Thames Barrier" was commended for the Norfolk Prize at the 2021 Café Writers Poetry Competition. Her extract-turned-short story "Monumenta" was highly commended in the Short Story category at the 2022 Bridport Prize.

In 2023, Canongate Books acquired the rights to publish Haworth's debut novel Monumenta in 2024. The novel deals with historical memory in contemporary Serbia, following widow Olga as her Dedinje house is repurposed for a massacre memorial, her adult daughter Hilde and son Danilo, and three architects. The setting was inspired by Haworth's Serbian friend, whose grandmother's house was sold in 2019, reminding Haworth of her own grandparents' house. Monumenta was shortlisted for a 2024 Nero Book Award in the Debut Fiction category and the Society of Authors' 2025 McKitterick Prize.

== Personal life ==
Haworth lives in Nunhead, South London with her partner, the artist Annie Frost Nicholson.

== Bibliography ==
=== Novels ===
- Monumenta (2024)

=== Shorts and essays ===
- "The Public Time of Private Space in Dior by Dior" with Ilya Parkins in Biography (2012)
- "Decolonial Imaginaries" in Theorizing Visual Studies (2012), edited by James Elkins
- "Garden" in Eco Art Incubator (2019)
- The World from my Window (2020)
  - "Patrick and Ushi's Loft"
  - "Old London"
- "Notes from a Supermarket" in Feels (2021)
- "Mistakes are Pure Colour" in Extra Extra (2022)
- "Monumenta" (2022)

=== Select poetry ===
- "Long Way" in Visual Verse: An Anthology of Art and Words (2016)
- "Vulcan" in Visual Verse: An Anthology of Art and Words (2018)
- "Haida Gwaii, 2086" in NōD (2018)
- "Androlikou, Akamas" in Eco Art Incubator (2019)
- "Driving Theory" in Visual Verse: An Anthology of Art and Words (2020)
- Collaboration with Fandangoe Kid
  - "Reclaim Your Heart" (2021)
  - "Love as an Act of Resistance" (2021)
  - "Protect Your Energy" (2021)
  - "Baggage is Only Experience" (2021)
- "Little Green" (2021)
- "The Thames Barrier" (2021)

== Accolades ==
Year	Award	Category	Title	Result	Ref.
2021	Café Writers Poetry Competition	Norfolk Prize	"The Thames Barrier"	Commended	
2022	Bridport Prize	Short Story	"Monumenta"	Commended	
2024	Nero Book Awards	Debut Fiction	Monumenta	Shortlisted	
2025	McKitterick Prize		Monumenta	Shortlisted	
