= Skippy Dies =

2010 novel by Paul Murray

- Hardcover edition
- Author: Paul Murray
- Language: English
- Genre: Novel
- Publisher: Hamish Hamilton
- Publication date: 4 February 2010
- Publication place: Ireland
- Media type: Print (hardcover and paperback)
- Pages: 672 pp (hardback)
- ISBN: 978-0-241-14182-3
- Preceded by: An Evening of Long Goodbyes

Skippy Dies is a 2010 tragicomic novel by Paul Murray. It was shortlisted for the 2010 Costa Book Awards, longlisted for the 2010 Booker Prize, and was a finalist for the National Book Critics Circle Award.

== Plot ==
Skippy Dies follows the lives of a group of students and faculty members at the fictional Seabrook College, a Catholic boarding school in Dublin. The title character, Daniel "Skippy" Juster, dies during a donut-eating contest in the novel's opening scene. The rest of the novel explores the events leading up to Skippy's death, as well as the aftermath within the Seabrook community.

== Development ==
The novel began as a short story, concerning a pupil and a teacher, but it quickly outgrew this as Murray created further characters. A later draft of the novel ran to a thousand pages, though Murray culled much of this before publication. The Seabrook College of the book is based on Blackrock College, Murray's old secondary school.

== Reception ==
The book was included in Time magazine's list of the ten best books of 2010, ranked at number three. British Prime Minister David Cameron was reported to be reading the book during his 2011 summer holidays in Spain. The book was also nominated for the 2010 Bollinger Everyman Wodehouse Prize for Comic Fiction and for the 2010 Irish Book Awards Irish Novel of the Year. In 2011, it was nominated for the 2012 International Dublin Literary Award.

== Selected reviews ==
- Patrick Ness. "Skippy Dies by Paul Murray". The Guardian. 6 February 2010. Retrieved on 5 May 2011.
- Dan Kois. "Ghost, Come Back Again". The New York Times. 3 September 2010. Retrieved on 5 May 2011.
- Michael Schaub. "'Skippy Dies in Dublin': A Funny Flashback Follows". NPR. 8 September 2010. Retrieved on 5 May 2011.
