= Suzannah Dunn =

British author

Suzannah Dunn is an English author and educator. She has written both contemporary and historical novels and her works have been shortlisted for literary awards, such as at the Romantic Novelists’ Association Awards and at the Nero Book Awards.

== Biography ==
Dunn is a graduate of the MA creative writing programme at the University of East Anglia, in Norwich, England. She was Director of the MA in Novel Writing at the University of Manchester, between 1999 and 2005.

In 1990, Dunn published her debut novel Darker Days Than Usual. She won a Betty Trask Award in 1991 for her second novel, Quite Contrary, which was reviewed by The Scotsman as "a luminous, honest and haunting portrait of a single woman doing a demanding job and trying to stay alive inside." Her 1999 novel Commencing Our Descent was shortlisted for the Romantic Novelists’ Association Awards book of the year.

Dunn's novel The Queen of Subtleties: A Novel of Anne Boleyn details the life of the Henry VIII's second wife, Anne Boleyn, and contrasts her life with the fictional Lucy Cornwallis, the royal confectioner of "subtleties," such as marzipan and icing sugar sculptures. A review of The Queen of Subtleties took issue with the character of Lucy but also stated that: "Dunn's blend of fiction and real events works and the personal perspective she offers is interesting." The Daily Telegraph has also described Dunn as "a remarkable writer, a lyricist of ordinary life and ordinary people transfigured by extreme emotions."

Dunn's 2008 novel The Queen's Sorrow tells the story of Rafael Prado, who is brought to England by Philip II of Spain to create a sundial for Whitehall Palace gardens as a gift to his wife Mary I of England, and contracts his life with the Queen's experiences of false pregnancies. Her 2010 novel The Confession of Katherine Howard was a Richard and Judy Book Club pick in 2011. Her 2020 novel The Testimony of Alys Twist explores the impact of the relationship between Mary I and her sister, later Elizabeth I of England, and the political and religious upheavals of the later Tudor period on ordinary English subjects.

In 2024, Dunn's novel Levitation for Beginners was shortlisted for the Nero Book Awards.

== Works ==
- Darker Days Than Usual (1990) ISBN 1-8524-2172-X
- Quite Contrary (1991) ISBN 0-0065-4479-7
- Blood Sugar (1994) ISBN 0-0065-4707-9
- Venus Flaring (1996) ISBN 0-0064-9792-6
- Tenterhooks (1998) ISBN 0-0065-5087-8
- Commencing Our Descent (2000) ISBN 0-0065-5088-6
- Past Caring (2000) ISBN 0-0065-4810-5
- The Queen of Subtleties: A Novel of Anne Boleyn (2004) ISBN 0-0605-9158-7
- The Sixth Wife (2007) ISBN 0-0072-2972-0
- The Queen's Sorrow (2008) ISBN 0-0072-5827-5
- The Confession of Katherine Howard (2010) ISBN 0-0072-5829-1
- The May Bride (2014) ISBN 1-6059-8630-5
- The Lady of Misrule (2015) ISBN 1-6059-8942-8
- Levitation for Beginners (2024) ISBN 978-1408707234
