= José Salvador Alvarenga =

Salvadoran man stranded at sea for 14 months (2012–2014)

- Born: c. 1975 (age 50–51); Garita Palmera, Ahuachapán, El Salvador
- Disappeared: November 17, 2012; On the coast of Costa Azul, Pijijiapan, Chiapas, Mexico
- Status: Found on January 30, 2014, on the Ebon Atoll on the Marshall Islands
- Other name: Cirilo
- Occupation: Fisherman
- Known for: Surviving 14 months at sea in a fishing boat with another man (Ezequiel Córdoba) who died during the voyage
- Children: One daughter

José Salvador Alvarenga (Spanish: [xoˈse salβaˈðoɾ alβaˈɾeŋɡa]; born c. 1975) is a Salvadoran fisherman and author who was found on January 30, 2014, aged 36 or 37, (Note: Most sources state that Alvarenga was 37, usually based on his own statements; however, he has been said to be uncertain about whether he is 36 or 37.) on the Marshall Islands after spending 14 months adrift in a fishing boat in the Pacific Ocean beginning on November 17, 2012. He survived mainly on a diet of raw fish, turtles, small birds, sharks and rainwater. He swam to shore at Tile Islet, a small island that is part of Ebon Atoll, on January 30. Two locals, Emi Libokmeto and Russel Laikidrik, found him naked, clutching a knife and shouting in Spanish. He was treated in a hospital in Majuro before flying to his family home in El Salvador on February 10.

Alvarenga's story was heavily reported worldwide despite initial criticism from skeptics. He is the first person in recorded history to have survived in a small boat lost at sea for more than a year.

== Early and personal life ==
Alvarenga was born in Garita Palmera, Ahuachapán, El Salvador, to José Ricardo Orellana and María Julia Alvarenga. His father, Orellana, owns a flour mill and store in the town. Alvarenga has a daughter who grew up in Garita Palmera with his parents, and several brothers who live in the United States. He left El Salvador in 2002 for Mexico, where he worked as a fisherman for four years, employed for a time by Villermino Rodríguez. At the time of his rescue, he had not been in touch with his family in eight years.

== Voyage ==
Approximate voyage of José Salvador Alvarenga

On November 17, 2012, Alvarenga set out from the fishing village of Costa Azul, near Pijijiapan, off the coast of Chiapas, Mexico. An experienced sailor and fisherman, he was intent on a 30-hour shift of deep-sea fishing, during which he hoped to catch sharks, marlins, and sailfish. His usual fishing mate was unable to join him, so he arranged instead to bring along the inexperienced 24-year-old Ezequiel Córdoba, with whom he had not previously spoken, and whose surname he did not know.

Shortly after embarking, their boat, a seven-meter (23-foot) topless fiberglass skiff equipped with a single outboard motor and a refrigerator-sized icebox for storing fish, was blown off course by a storm that lasted five days, during which the motor and most of the portable electronics were damaged. Though they had caught nearly 500 kilograms (1,100 lb) of fresh fish, the pair were forced to dump it overboard to make the boat maneuverable in the bad weather. Alvarenga managed to call his boss on a two-way radio and request help before the radio's battery died. Having neither sails nor oars, no anchor, no running lights, and no other way to contact shore, the boat began to drift across the open ocean. Much of the fishing gear was also lost or damaged in the storm, leaving them with only a handful of basic supplies and little food.

The search party organized by Alvarenga's employer failed to find any trace of the missing men and gave up after two days because visibility was poor. As days turned to weeks, they learned to scavenge their food from whatever sources presented themselves. Alvarenga managed to catch fish, turtles, jellyfish, and seabirds with his bare hands, and the pair occasionally salvaged bits of food and plastic refuse floating in the water. They collected drinking water from rainfall when possible, but more frequently were forced to drink turtle blood or their own urine. Alvarenga frequently dreamed about his favorite foods, as well as his parents.

According to Alvarenga, Córdoba lost all hope around four months into the voyage after becoming sick from the raw food, and eventually died from starvation by refusing to eat. Alvarenga has said that he contemplated suicide for four days after Córdoba died, but his Christian faith prevented him from doing so. He related that Córdoba made him promise not to eat his corpse after he died, so he kept it on the boat. He sometimes spoke to the corpse and after six days, fearing he was going insane, he threw it overboard.

Alvarenga reported that he saw numerous transoceanic container ships but was unable to solicit help. He kept track of time by counting the phases of the moon. After counting his 15th lunar cycle, he spotted land: a tiny, desolate islet, which turned out to be a remote corner of the Marshall Islands. On January 30, 2014, he abandoned his boat and swam to shore, where he stumbled upon a beach house owned by a local couple. Alvarenga's journey had lasted 438 days.

The length of his voyage has been variously calculated as 5,500 to 6,700 miles (8,900 to 10,800 km). Some newspapers originally reported Alvarenga's tally of 15-plus lunar cycles as 16 months, but eventually corrected this to 13 months. According to Gee Bing, Marshall Islands' acting secretary of foreign affairs, Alvarenga's vital signs were all "good", with the exception of blood pressure, which was unusually low. Bing also said that Alvarenga had swollen ankles and struggled with walking. He was anemic, and doctors suspected that his consumption of raw meat had led to parasites infecting his liver. On February 6 the doctor treating him reported that his health had "gone downhill" since the day before and that he was on an IV drip to treat his dehydration.

=== Reactions ===
==== Family ====
Alvarenga's parents, who had not been in contact with him for more than a year, had feared he was dead long before he went missing, and they were overjoyed to discover he was still alive. His father said that he had prayed for his son while he was missing. His daughter, upon hearing that her father had been found, said that after he returned home, the "first thing I'll do is hug him and kiss him."

==== Initial doubts and support ====
The implausibility of someone surviving so long at sea on a small craft led a number of commentators to doubt Alvarenga's story, though investigators were able to confirm some of the basic details. The owner of the boat he used, César Castillo, said that "it's incredible to survive that long. It's hard to think how anybody could go more than six or seven months without getting scurvy at least." However, in an interview, Claude Piantadosi of Duke University said that fresh meat from birds and turtles contains vitamin C and that eating a lot of it, as Alvarenga claims to have done, "would provide sufficient vitamin C to prevent scurvy." The Guardian found the Chiapas rescue services official, Jaime Marroquín, who was informed that a fishing boat had gone missing in the area on November 17, 2012. The official report identified the two fishermen as Cirilo Vargas and Ezequiel Córdova, and stated that both were in their 30s. Marroquín also indicated that according to the boat's owner, Vargas was born in El Salvador. The local authorities originally searched for Vargas and Córdova, but called off the search after two days, citing heavy fog and bad weather. In regard to the discrepancy between the names of the fishermen in the 2012 report and those of Alvarenga and Córdoba, CBS News reported that "records in Mexico are often filed with such mistakes". Another explanation was provided by Alvarenga's parents, as reported by National Post, when they confirmed that in Mexico their son was known as "Cirilo".

Tom Armbruster, the United States ambassador to the Marshall Islands, acknowledged that it seems implausible for someone to survive at sea for 13 months, but that "it's also hard to imagine how someone might arrive on Ebon out of the blue. Certainly this guy has had an ordeal, and has been at sea for some time." Norman Barth, also of the American Embassy in the Marshall Islands, did the initial questioning of Alvarenga upon his arrival in Majuro and found him to be truthful. In addition, Erik van Sebille, an oceanographer at the University of New South Wales, said that it was entirely possible that sea currents could carry a boat from Mexico to the Marshall Islands. He also estimated that such a trip would take about 18 months, but said that 13 months was still plausible. Further support for his account came from a study by researchers from the University of Hawaii that modeled the path a boat might have taken after departing from the Pacific Coast in Mexico based on wind and currents, and concluded that it would end up "within 120 miles (190 km) of Ebon", where Alvarenga actually landed. In April 2014, Alvarenga's lawyer told a press conference that he had passed a polygraph test while being asked about his voyage.

== Life after rescue ==
After 11 days in a hospital, Alvarenga was deemed healthy enough to return to El Salvador. However, he was diagnosed with anemia, had trouble sleeping and developed a fear of water. In 2015, he gave a series of interviews about his ordeal to journalist Jonathan Franklin, who later told Alvarenga's story in the book 438 Days: An Extraordinary True Story of Survival at Sea.

Shortly after the release of 438 Days, the family of Córdoba sued Alvarenga for $1,000,000, accusing him of cannibalizing their relative in order to survive, despite Alvarenga sharing that he promised Córdoba he would not eat him. Alvarenga's lawyer has denied this accusation. There was no evidence to those claims.

== See also ==
- Dougal Robertson
- List of people who disappeared mysteriously at sea
- Jesús Vidaña
- Maurice and Maralyn Bailey
- Rose-Noëlle
- Poon Lim
- Life of Pi

== Literature ==
- Jonathan Franklin: 438 Days: An Extraordinary True Story of Survival at Sea, New York, 2016. (The story of José Salvador Alvarenga, written down by an investigative journalist)
- Paul Lynch: ‘Beyond the Sea’, London, 2021.
