= Beth Lincoln =

English children's writer (born 1992)

- Born: 1 February 1992 (age 34); Durham, England
- Education: University of Sussex; Newcastle University
- Years active: 2017–present

Beth Lincoln (born 1 February 1992) is an English children's writer. Her (Note: Lincoln uses she/her and they/them pronouns.) debut mystery novel The Swifts (2023) became a #1 New York Times bestseller and won a Nero Book Award among other accolades.

== Early life ==
Lincoln is from Durham and grew up in a former railway station house nearby. She graduated with a Bachelor of Arts (BA) in English literature from the University of Sussex in 2014 and a Master of Arts (MA) in Creative Writing from Newcastle University in 2015.

== Career ==
Lincoln's first publication was a Hobbit- inspired short story in her village's parish magazine. Lincoln was a 2017 Penguin Random House WriteNow mentee, where she worked on her debut novel, then under the working title A Plural of Swifts.

In 2021, Puffin Books acquired the rights to publish Lincoln's debut middle-grade mystery novel The Swifts in 2023. Also released as The Swifts: A Dictionary of Scoundrels, it became a #1 New York Times bestseller in the Middle Grade Paperback category. She also published a book “The Swifts: A Garden of Vipers” on September 22, 2026, which was a Goodhouskeeping Kids’ Book Award winner. The Swifts won a Nero Book Award and Barnes & Noble Children's and YA Book Awards in the Overall and Young Reader categories, and was shortlisted for a Waterstones Children's Book Prize and the Branford Boase Award. It was also an American Booksellers Association Indies Introduce pick. Puffin would acquire two further titles in the series, one published in 2024, and one that will be published in late 2026.

== Personal life ==
Lincoln is queer and uses she/her and they/them pronouns.

== Bibliography ==
- The Swifts: A Dictionary of Scoundrels (2023)
- The Swifts: A Gallery of Rogues (2024)
- The Swifts: A Garden of Vipers (2026)

== Accolades ==
Year	Award	Category	Title	Result	Ref.
2023	Barnes & Noble Children's and YA Book Award	Overall	The Swifts	Won	
2023	Barnes & Noble Children's and YA Book Award	Young Reader	The Swifts	Won	
2024	Nero Book Awards	Children's Fiction	The Swifts	Won	
2024	Waterstones Children's Book Prize	Younger Fiction	The Swifts	Shortlisted	
2024	Branford Boase Award		The Swifts	Shortlisted	
