= Michael Smith (American journalist) =

American journalist

External videos
- Q&A interview with Smith and Jonathan Franklin on Cabin Fever, July 24, 2022, C-SPAN

Michael Smith is a journalist responsible for coverage of Latin America for Bloomberg Markets magazine.

He was a freelance journalist covering Chile. He graduated from University of North Carolina. He worked at the Daily Record in Morristown, New Jersey and the Associated Press.

He has three sons and lives in Santiago, Chile.

In 2022 he published his first book, co-authored with Jonathan Franklin, Cabin Fever: The Harrowing Journey of a Cruise Ship at the Dawn of a Pandemic about the Holland-America cruise ship MS Zaandam during the early days of the COVID-19 pandemic as it sought a friendly port from the tip of South America to Florida.

== Awards ==
- 2005 George Polk award for Health Reporting, for "Big Pharma's Shameful Secret"
- 2005 Investigative Reporters and Editors prize
- 2006 The Hillman Prize
- 2008 Maria Moors Cabot Prize winner
- 2021 Gerald Loeb Award for Investigative business journalism for "Addicted to Profit", Bloomberg News

== Work ==
- "Banks Financing Mexico Gangs Admitted in Wells Fargo Deal". Bloomberg News. June 29, 2010.
- "Chile Steps Up Efforts to Fight Disease After Quake (Update1)". March 6, 2010. Archived from the original on March 8, 2010.
