= Jonathan Franklin =

American journalist

Jonathan Franklin (born 6 September 1964) is an American book author, investigative journalist and TV commentator on Latin American politics and news.

== Biography ==
Franklin was born in Manchester, New Hampshire, and raised in Lincoln, Massachusetts, where he graduated from Lincoln-Sudbury Regional High School. Franklin attended Brown University in Providence, Rhode Island, from 1983 to 1988. Since 1995, Franklin has lived and worked in South America with his wife and daughters, based in Santiago, Chile.

== Career ==
After graduation he worked as a news clerk at The New York Times in Manhattan. From 1990 to 1995 Franklin lived in San Francisco and worked as a reporter for the San Francisco Bay Guardian and SF Weekly as well as The Boston Globe. As a reporter for Playboy magazine in the early 1990s, Franklin interviewed prominent figures in the United States, including Patrick Buchanan and Timothy McVeigh. His work is regularly published by Playboy, GQ, Esquire, Marie Claire and other magazines around the world.

Franklin is co-founder of Addictvillage, a news and media agency based in Chile. Through Addictvillage Jonathan has written adventure news stories from Latin America, about topics ranging from U.S. deportation of illegal immigrants to hidden cocaine labs in the Colombian jungle to "eco barons" in Chile.

In 2011 Franklin published a book about the 2010 Copiapó mining accident called 33 Men: Inside the Miraculous Survival and Dramatic Rescue of the Chilean Miners. During the accident, he reported extensively from the San Jose mine for The Guardian and The Washington Post. Franklin's experiences and insider accounts became the basis of a 60 Minutes TV program about the miners, an article in People magazine, and a series of audio lectures on the BBC. Franklin says, "While 2,000 journalists were locked behind police lines, my 'Rescue Team' pass enabled me to experience up close the final six weeks of this miracle rescue. It was my honor to watch the drama unfold in its many moments of beauty and courage and comedy; and to see, first-hand, the profound unity that made this operation succeed."

In 2015, he published 438 Days: An Extraordinary True Story of Survival at Sea, based on the account of José Salvador Alvarenga, the Salvadoran fisherman who spent 14 months adrift in the Pacific Ocean.

In 2021, he published A Wild Idea, a biography of the American Douglas Tompkins who founded The North Face and Esprit clothing company, who then moved to Chile and bought up large tracts of land in Patagonia for conservation.

External videos
- Q&A interview with Franklin and Michael Smith on Cabin Fever, July 24, 2022, C-SPAN

In 2022, Franklin and co-author Michael Smith published Cabin Fever: The Harrowing Journey of a Cruise Ship at the Dawn of a Pandemic about the Holland-America cruise ship MS Zaandam during the early days of the COVID-19 pandemic as it sought a friendly port from the tip of South America to Miami Florida.
