= Sophie Elmhirst =

British journalist and author

- Occupations: Journalist and author
- Writing career
- Notable works: Maurice and Maralyn
- Notable awards: "Features writer of the year", British Journalism Awards (2020); Nero Book Awards (2024)
- Website: www.sophieelmhirst.com

Sophie Elmhirst is a British journalist and author. She writes for publications including The Guardian's "Long Read", The Economist's 1843 digital magazine, The Gentlewoman and Harper's Bazaar. Her 2024 book Maurice and Maralyn (US: A Marriage at Sea), described the experiences of Maurice and Maralyn Bailey who spent 118 days adrift in a liferaft in 1973. It won a number of awards.

== Maurice and Maralyn ==
Elmhirst's first book, Maurice and Maralyn, was published in 2024. The book was published in the United States in 2025 as A Marriage at Sea.

Elmhirst has described how she came across the story of Maurice and Maralyn Bailey during the COVID-19 pandemic in the United Kingdom, when "It was cold and miserable and I was sitting at my desk with the kids going crazy downstairs." She found Alvaro Cerezo's website where he recorded tales of castaway and stranded people, and was intrigued by the fact that this English couple's experience was so little known. Cerezo's site included photographs of pages of Maralyn's diaries, and he had recorded an interview with Maurice in 2017.

== Honours and awards ==
In 2020, she won the features writer of the year award in the British Journalism Awards. The articles cited in the award were on domestic abuse, the tampon industry, and a cleaner's experience of working during the COVID-19 pandemic. Elmhirst was long-listed for the 2020 Orwell Prize for Journalism, the cited works being the second and third listed above and an article on maternity care.

Maurice and Maralyn won the 2024 "Golden Nero" as the overall winner of the Nero Book Awards. It won the 2025 National Outdoor Book Award in the Outdoor literature category.
