= Stephen Buoro =

Nigerian novelist

- Born: 1993 (age 32–33); Ososo, Nigeria
- Education: University of East Anglia
- Occupation: Novelist
- Writing career
- Period: 2023 – present
- Genre: Literary fiction
- Notable work: The Five Sorrowful Mysteries of Andy Africa (2023)
- Website: stephenbuoro.com

Stephen Buoro (born 1993) is a Nigerian writer known for his distinctive voice and narrative style in contemporary African literature. He gained recognition with his debut novel, The Five Sorrowful Mysteries of Andy Africa, published in 2023 by Bloomsbury.

== Personal life ==
Buoro comes from a strong Catholic background, and describes the Bible as "the book that's defined my life." He is the fourth of six children. His parents migrated from northern to southern Nigeria to escape political turmoil, and Buoro was born in Ososo, a southern town. The family later returned to the north, settling in Kontagora, the setting of his first novel.

Buoro learned to read at the age of eight. Despite his parents not being educated beyond primary school level, he credits the "wonderful conversations" he had with his "incredibly witty and funny" mother for his interest in writing: "She made me recognize the beauty, power, transfiguration, and transcendence that words attain in certain permutations." Buoro received a scholarship to a missionary school, where he received corporal punishment for speaking his local language. At eleven, he began writing as a way of expressing his feelings after the death of his father. Alongside self-publishing poetry on his blog, he had poems published in Nigerian magazines and newspapers.

== Career ==
After obtaining a first-class degree in mathematics, Buoro worked as a part-time mathematics teacher for seven months in Nigeria, earning a modest income.

In 2018, Buoro received the Booker Prize Foundation Scholarship and commenced writing his first novel, The Five Sorrowful Mysteries of Andy Africa, on his BlackBerry phone. The publishing rights for the book were sold for substantial sums in the UK and the USA, and it was published in 2023 to generally positive reviews. Buoro cites influences such as Chinua Achebe, Anthony Burgess, Junot Díaz, Fyodor Dostoevsky, and J. D. Salinger.

Buoro holds an MA in Creative Writing from the University of East Anglia and a PhD in Creative and Critical Writing from the same institution.

== Critical reception ==
The Guardian named Buoro as one of their ten best new novelists for 2023, describing The Five Sorrowful Mysteries of Andy Africa as "an exhilarating, tragicomic novel that questions what it means to come of age in Nigeria today." The Economist also highlighted the novel's bildungsroman aspects, stating it was "among the best" coming-of-age stories in contemporary African literature. They offered a nuanced perspective on Buoro's writing style: "His sentences are mad, boisterous, incantatory—and, in a continent where rhythm is as common as praying, quite singular. The prose on any page could only be his."

The Independent found the novel predictable in places, but added that "this can be forgiven as Buoro [...] brings Andy's world to life with such immediacy." Interview Magazine called it "a bold demonstration of the Booker Scholar's cheeky and highly personal narrative voice." The Chicago Review of Books praised the book's "hypersensitive attention to modern Nigerian life," while the African media company STATEMENT warned that "this novel doesn't cater to Western audiences or coddle readers who may not understand its idiosyncrasies."

== Awards ==
In 2020, an excerpt from The Five Sorrowful Mysteries of Andy Africa earned second place in the Deborah Rogers Foundation Writers Award. The judging panel, including Ian Rankin, praised Buoro for creating "a narrative of depth that also manages to be instantly engaging."

It was shortlisted at the inaugural Nero Book Awards in the Debut Fiction category. The judges described it as "extraordinary, driven by a gloriously eccentric central character" and "utterly compelling, not shy about posing difficult questions for the reader." However, they cautioned potential readers, stating, "don't expect it to provide any neat answers." The novel was also shortlisted for the Art Seidenbaum Award for First Fiction and longlisted for the Aspen Words Literary Prize and Authors' Club Best First Novel Award.

== Bibliography ==
- —— (2023). The Five Sorrowful Mysteries of Andy Africa. London: Bloomsbury. ISBN 9781526637994.
