= Zodiac Milpro =

Company producing rigid inflatable boats

Zodiac Milpro Group

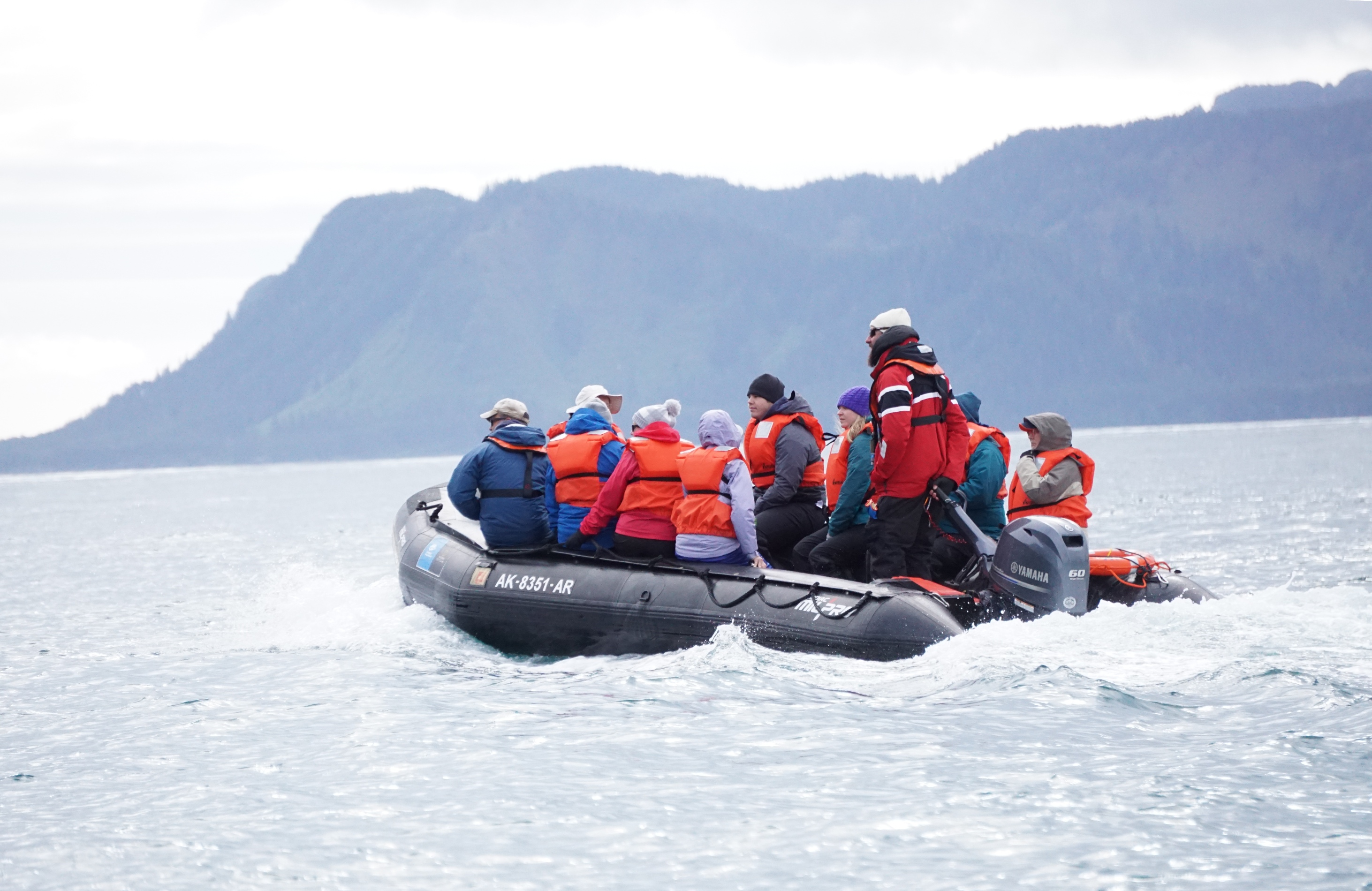
- Tourists and naturalist in Zodiac Milpro, in 2018.
- Trade name: Zodiac Milpro
- Formerly: Zodiac Military and Professional
- Company type: Private (Société par Actions Simplifiée)
- Industry: holding company activities
- Founded: 1896; 130 years ago
- Founder: Maurice Mallet
- Headquarters: Paris, France
- Area served: Worldwide
- Brands: Zodiac Milpro, Hurricane
- Parent: Zodiac Group (1896–2007) Zodiac Marine & Pool (2007–2012)
- Subsidiaries: Avon Inflatables; Zodiac Hurricane Technologies Inc. Vectis Marine; Yachtwerft Meyer GmbH
- Website: zodiacmilpro.com

Zodiac Milpro Group, formerly Zodiac Military and Professional, headquartered in Paris, France, is a company that manufactures inflatable boats and rigid hull inflatable boats for the emergency services, military and professional users, including heavy-duty inflatable work boats that can carry payloads up to four tons and passengers for ecotourism, whale watching, etc.

== Ownership ==
Headquartered in Paris, France and with manufacturing facilities in Delta, British Columbia, Roses, Spain, and Stevensville, Maryland. Zodiac Military and Professional was a business unit of the Zodiac Group till 2008, when it was renamed Milpro, part of the independent company Zodiac Marine & Pool. In 2011, it was spun off from Zodiac Group and it became an independent company.

In December 2012, Zodiac Milpro was sold by its parent company, Zodiac Marine & Pool, being acquired by Oaktree Capital. The following year, Zodiac Milpro acquired the British inflatable boat manufacturer Avon Inflatables, which was renamed Zodiac Milpro UK.

== Name ==
Though Zodiac Milpro and Zodiac Nautic produce a large range of both inflatable and rigid-hulled boats, the name "Zodiac" has become synonymous with inflatable boats such as the FC470 and as a generic term for inflatable boats.

== History ==
=== Origins ===
The first verified recorded "inflatable boats" are probably the inflatable pontoons used by the Duke of Wellington's forces in the Napoleonic wars. The first modern inflatable boats were designed and built almost concurrently by RFD in the UK and Zodiac in France.

Zodiac, like RFD, had existing expertise in dirigible airships made from vulcanised rubber. Zodiac produced its first prototypes for the French army in 1934. In 1934, Zodiac engineer Pierre Debroutelle designed the prototype of an inflatable kayak. In 1937, interested in his research, the Naval Aviation commissioned him to develop a boat capable of carrying torpedoes and bombs. Pierre Debroutelle developed a new prototype: a U-shaped boat equipped with two side air chambers joined by a wooden dashboard: the ancestor of the modern Zodiac inflatable boat.

1934: Zodiac produced the world's first mass produced inflatable boat. The boats were popular for military use due to their low center of gravity, large payload, and sea keeping abilities.

In 1940, Zodiac invented the prototype of the first inflatable boat.

In the early 1960s, the Royal National Lifeboat Institution in Great Britain designed the first rigid hulled inflatable boat (RIB). This hybrid craft was developed for high speed, offshore sea and rescue operations. Zodiac Milpro continued research and development of this new technology and developed the concept into today's rigid hull inflatable boats.

In the 1970s, Zodiac expanded globally, establishing Zodiac of North America and Zodiac Australia. In 1971, Zodiac launched the Avon SeaRider, the world's first commercial/military RIB.

In 1987, Zodiac Group acquired a majority share in the capital of Zodiac Marine Ltd. and a majority stake in Hurricane Rescue Craft Inc. and formed Zodiac Hurricane Marine Inc. (ZHM).

In 1991, Zodiac Group combined its Toronto-based distribution subsidiary (ZIT) with its manufacturing company in Richmond (ZHM), to form Zodiac Hurricane Technologies Inc. (ZHT). Today, Zodiac Hurricane Technologies is the world's largest manufacturer of professional RIBs.

=== Part of Zodiac Marine & Pool (2007–2013) ===
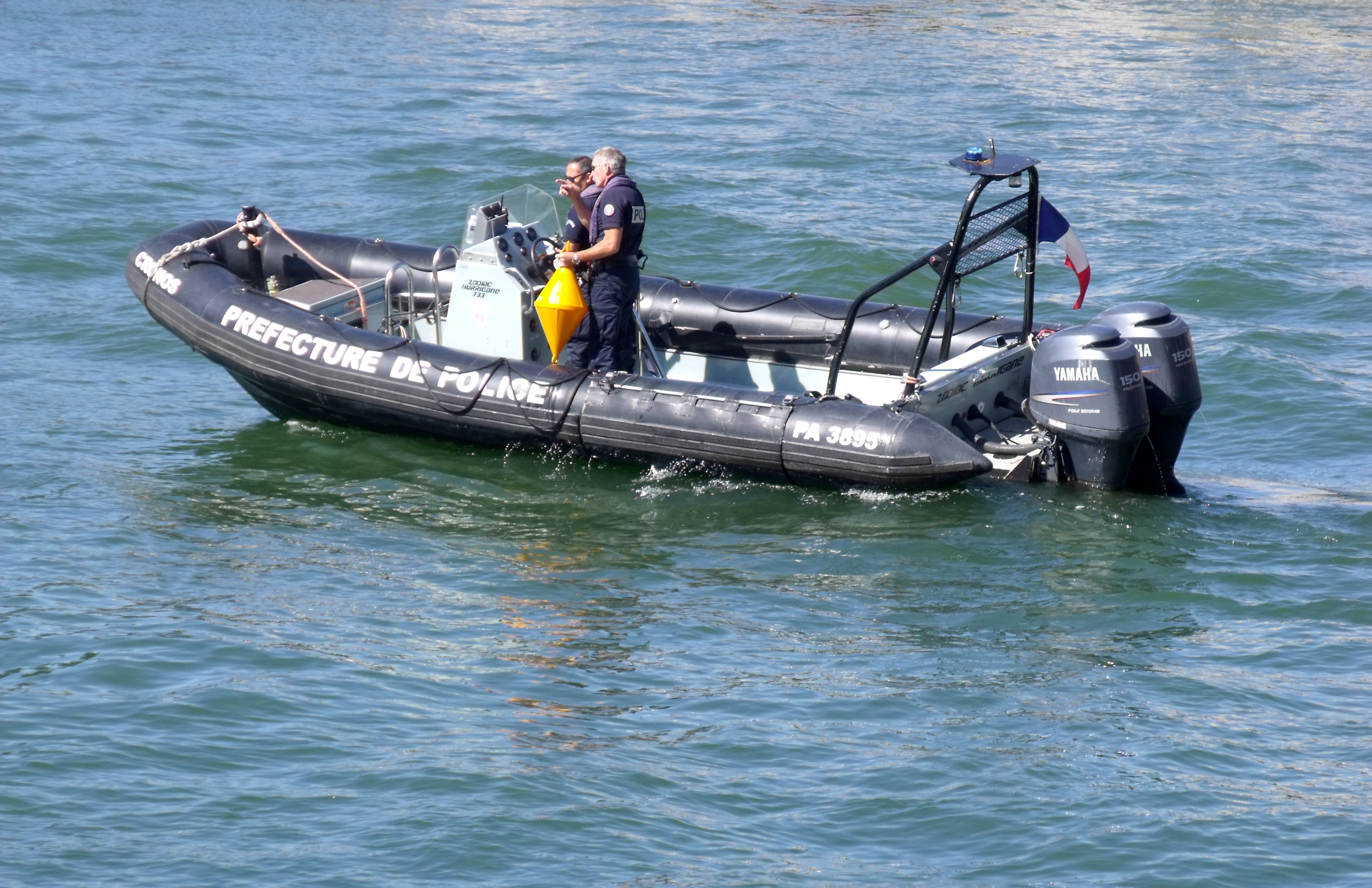
High speed light boat of the river Seine police unit in Paris in August 2012

In 2008, Zodiac Military and Professional becomes a separate business unit within the new Zodiac Marine & Pool, founded in 2007. Zodiac Marine & Pool established "Zodiac Milpro" as a separate brand in 2011.

=== Zodiac Milpro Group (2013–) ===
In 2013, Zodiac Marine & Pool sold the Military and Professional business unit "Zodiac Milpro" to Oaktree Capital.

In 2021, Zodiac Milpro acquires Southampton (UK) based naval architecture firm Vectis Marine. The following year, Zodiac Milpro introduced ORIA Marine, a data-monitoring service that supports decarbonization in maritime operations, and acquired Yachtwerft Meyer, a German shipyard that designs and produces custom-made premium boats.

In 2024, impending sale of Zodiac Milpro announced to the press.

== Ranges ==
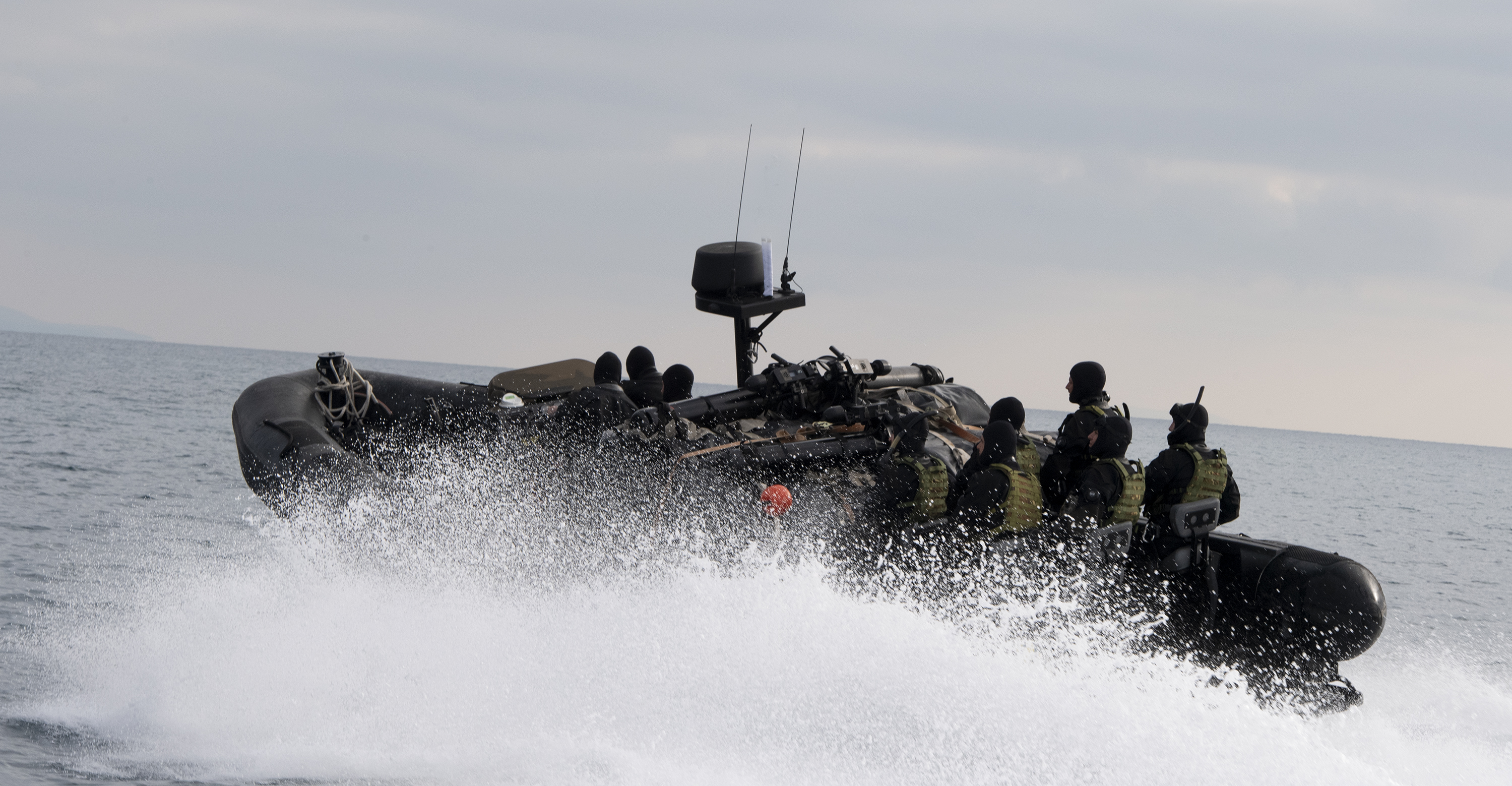
Italian Army 185th Paratroopers Reconnaissance Target Acquisition Regiment "Folgore" operators in a Zodiac Hurricane RHIB

- Zodiac Milpro Sea RIB range (from 4 to 11 m)
- Zodiac Hurricane RIB range (from 6 to 13 m)
- Zodiac Milpro Futura Commando range, multi-mission military inflatable boats
- Zodiac Milpro ZMSR and ERB inflatable rescue boats
- Zodiac Milpro Heavy Duty and Grand Raid professional multi-purpose inflatable boats
- Yachtwerft Meyer yacht tenders, limousines and custom projects

== Users ==
- Royal Canadian Navy,
- French Navy,
- Ministry of Defence Police,
- Armed Forces of Ukraine,
- Singapore Navy,
- Royal Australian Navy,
- New South Wales Police,
- Hong Kong Police Force,
- France National Gendarmerie,
- Finnish Border Guard,
- Guardia di Finanza,
- France Commandos Marine,
