= The Hypocrite (novel) =

2024 book by Jo Hamya

- Author: Jo Hamya
- Language: English
- Publisher: Pantheon Books
- Publication date: August 13, 2024
- Pages: 233
- ISBN: 9780593701034

The Hypocrite: A Novel is a 2024 book by Jo Hamya. The novel focuses on the relationship between playwright Sophia and her unnamed father, a controversial writer. The novel was shortlisted at the 2024 Nero Book Awards and won a 2025 Somerset Maugham Award.

== Synopsis ==
The novel takes place in London in August 2020, during a brief respite from the COVID-19 pandemic. An unnamed author attends a critically acclaimed play written by his estranged daughter, Sophia. The author realizes the play is based on a decade old vacation to Sicily he took with a teenage Sophia, during which he forced her to type out his novel and ignored her so he could have sex with local women. Despite the play's harsh treatment of his character, he sees genius in Sophia's writing. While he watches the play, Sophia eats lunch with her mother, who divorced her father years ago and recently moved in with him due to the pandemic. The two debate the play and their relationship with the author, with Sophia's mother defending him from some of Sophia's criticisms. Despite Sophia's contempt for her father, she wants to discuss the play with him and seeks his approval.

The identity of the titular hypocrite is not directly stated.

== Reception ==
The book received positive reviews in several publications. Writing for The New York Times, Joumana Khatib praised the novel's juggling of its themes, "In less capable hands, the novel might have become a tiresome examination of how sexual mores evolve between generations, or a flimsy inversion of Oedipal myth. But as in her 2021 debut novel, “Three Rooms,” Hamya is attuned to the precarity that young women inherit, the realization that no amount of privilege, education or artistic chops could confer the freedom or power they desire."
