= Jo Hamya =

British novelist (born 1997)

Joyce Hamya (born 1997) is a British novelist. She has authored the novels Three Rooms (2021) and The Hypocrite (2024).

== Early life and education ==
Hamya is from East London, born to a Polish mother and a Ugandan father. Hamya graduated from King’s College London and University of Oxford. As of 2024, she is pursuing a PhD.

== Career ==
Hamya began her career as a copy editor for Tatler and a bookseller at Waterstones. She also contributed to the Financial Times and The British Blacklist. Hamya was 22 when she wrote her debut novel Three Rooms and 24 when it was published in 2021 via Jonathan Cape, as announced in 2020.

In 2023, it was announced Weidenfeld & Nicolson has acquired the rights to publish Hamya's second novel The Hypocrite in 2024, which she described as "born out of questions the pandemic and my first novel left behind". The novel was shortlisted at the 2024 Nero Book Awards and won a 2025 Somerset Maugham Award.

Hamya co-hosts the Booker Prize Podcast with James Walton.

== Works ==
- Hamya, Jo (2021). Three Rooms. Boston New York: Mariner Books. ISBN 978-0-358-57209-1.
- Hamya, Jo (2024-08-13). The Hypocrite. Pantheon. ISBN 978-0-593-70103-4.
