= Paul Murray (author) =

Irish author (born 1975)

- Born: 1975 (age 50–51); Dublin, Ireland
- Education: Blackrock College; Trinity College, Dublin; University of East Anglia
- Occupation: Writer
- Writing career
- Period: 2003–present
- Genre: Comic fiction
- Notable works: An Evening of Long Goodbyes (2003); Skippy Dies (2010); The Bee Sting (2023)
- Notable awards: Irish Book Award; Nero Book Award

Paul Murray (born 1975) is an Irish novelist, essayist, short story writer, and screenwriter, the author of the novels An Evening of Long Goodbyes (2003), Skippy Dies (2010), The Mark and the Void (2015), and The Bee Sting (2023).

He also wrote the screenplay for Metal Heart.

== Biography ==
Murray was born in Dublin, Ireland, in 1975, the son of a professor of Anglo-Irish Drama at University College Dublin and a teacher. Murray attended Blackrock College in south Dublin, an experience that would later provide the basis for the school in Skippy Dies. He studied English literature at Trinity College, Dublin, and subsequently completed his master's in creative writing at the University of East Anglia. He also spent time in Barcelona, Spain, as an English teacher, a time he did not enjoy, describing it as "a brief and unhappy stint teaching English to a Catalan businessman, who pointed out many faults in my grammar I had not known about hitherto". He describes Gravity's Rainbow as "really inspiring for me when I was younger because it was a bridge between the world of literature and the world of pop culture."

== Novels ==
Murray has written four novels: his first, An Evening of Long Goodbyes, was shortlisted for the Whitbread First Novel Prize in 2003 and nominated for the Kerry Group Irish Fiction Award. His second novel, Skippy Dies, was longlisted for the 2010 Booker Prize and shortlisted for the 2010 Costa Prize, the Bollinger Everyman Wodehouse Prize for Comic Fiction, and the National Book Critics Circle Award for Fiction. It was also number three on Time magazine's top-ten works of fiction from 2010. His third novel, The Mark and the Void, was one of Time's top-ten best fiction books for 2015, and joint winner of the Bollinger Everyman Wodehouse Prize in 2016.

His most recent novel, The Bee Sting, was published in 2023. Described as "a tragicomic triumph" and a source of "pure page-turning pleasure" in The Guardian, it was shortlisted for the 2023 Booker Prize, won an Irish Book Award as 2023 Novel of the Year, and won the inaugural £30,000 Nero Gold prize for the 2023 Book of the Year. The Bee Sting was included on the New York Times list of “The Best Fiction Books of 2023”.

== List of works ==
=== Novels ===
- An Evening of Long Goodbyes (2003)
- Skippy Dies (2010)
- The Mark and the Void (2015)
- The Bee Sting (2023)

==== Short stories ====
- "That's My Bike!" (2011), published in The Paris Review
- "The Dragon-Ship" (2016), published in The Irish Times

=== Screenplays ===
- Metal Heart (2018), directed by Hugh O'Conor.

== Personal life ==
Murray lives in Dublin with his wife and son. He has written about books he admires for The Millions's Year in Reading series.
