= Chloe Michelle Howarth =

Irish writer

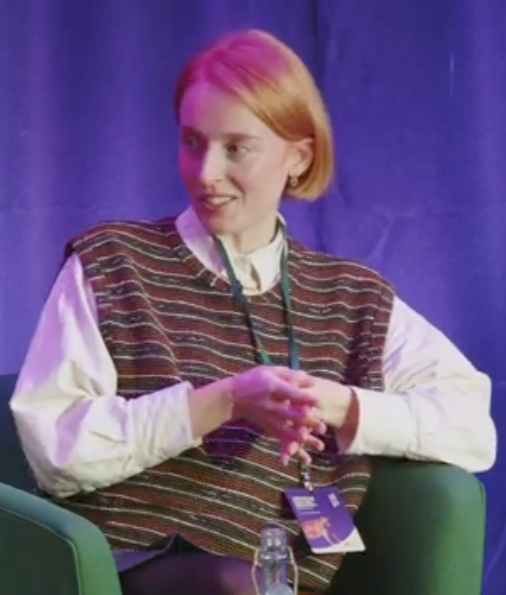
- At the British Library's Irish Writers' Weekend in 2024
- Born: July 1996 (age 30)
- Education: IADT
- Years active: 2022–present
- Website: www.chloemichellehowarth.com

Chloe Michelle Howarth (born July 1996) is an Irish novelist based in Brighton. Her debut novel Sunburn (2023) was shortlisted for a number of accolades.

== Early life ==
Howarth grew up in Rosscarbery, County Cork with her two brothers. She graduated from the Dún Laoghaire Institute of Art, Design and Technology.

== Career ==
At the end of 2022, Verve Books acquired the rights to publish Howarth's debut novel Sunburn in 2023. Howarth came up with the idea at the end of 2019 and began writing it at her family's house during the COVID-19 lockdown. Set in a fictional Cork village amid the 1993 decriminalisation of homosexuality in Ireland, the novel follows the clandestine relationship between characters Lucy and Susannah starting in 1989. Sunburn was shortlisted for a Nero Book Award in the Debut Fiction category, Discover Book of the Year at the British Book Awards and the Polari First Book Prize. It was also a runner-up for the adult Readers' Choice award at the Diverse Book Awards.

Howarth worked with Verve Books again for the publication of her second novel in 2025, the 1960s-set Gothic Heap Earth Upon It.

In 2026, Howarth signed a two-book deal with Penguin Michael Joseph (PMJ).

== Personal life ==
Howarth is queer. She moved to Brighton after the COVID-19 lockdown.

== Bibliography ==
- Sunburn (2023)
- Heap Earth Upon It (2025)
- Aftertaste (2027)

== Accolades ==
Year	Award	Category	Title	Result	Ref.
2023	Nero Book Awards	Debut Fiction	Sunburn	Shortlisted	
2024	British Book Awards	Discover Book of the Year	Sunburn	Shortlisted	
2024	Polari First Book Prize		Sunburn	Shortlisted	
2024	Diverse Book Awards	Readers' Choice – Adult	Sunburn	Runner-up	
