= Claire Lynch (writer) =

Writer and academic (born 1981)

Claire Lynch (born 1981) is an English writer and academic. Her novel A Family Matter was the winner of the debut fiction and the Gold awards at the Nero Book Awards. Lynch is the first debut novelist to win the overall prize at the Nero Awards since 2013. A Family Matter is about the removal of children from their lesbian mothers in child custody cases in 1980s Britain.

Lynch worked at Brunel University for 16 years. She is now an honorary professor of English and creative writing at Brunel.

== Early life ==
Lynch is from Dartford, Kent; her paternal family are from Cork. Lynch attended Wilmington Grammar School. She graduated from the University of Kent and the University of Oxford.

== Personal life ==
Lynch lives in Windsor with her wife Beth and their three daughters.

== Published works ==
- Lynch, Claire (2009). Irish Autobiography: Stories of Self in the Narrative of a Nation. Peter Lang (publisher). ISBN 978-3039118564.
- Lynch, Claire (2014). Cyber Ireland: Text, Image, Culture. Palgrave Macmillan. ISBN 978-1349347414.
- Lynch, Claire (2021). Small: On Motherhoods. Brazen. ISBN 978-1914240065.
