= Nero Book Awards =

British literary awards

The Nero Book Awards
- Awarded for: the book you would most want to press into the hands of friends and family
- Sponsored by: Caffè Nero
- Reward: £30,000
- First award: 2024; 2 years ago
- Final award: Active
- Website: nerobookawards.com

The Nero Book Awards are British literary awards, inaugurated in 2023. They are run by coffeehouse chain Caffè Nero in partnership with the Booksellers' Association, Brunel University London, and Right To Dream, "a football community dedicated to expanding people's understanding of excellence through football".

The awards are made in four categories: children's fiction, fiction, debut fiction, and non-fiction. A short list of four is drawn up for each category, and category winners are chosen, receiving £5,000. There is then a further selection process before one of the category winners is awarded the £30,000 "Golden Nero" award as "Book of the year". The awards are open to books published in the UK and Ireland, and at the time of entry the author must be alive and have been resident in the UK or Ireland for three years. The criteria for the awards are described as: "Our judges will be asked to choose the books they would most want to press into the hands of friends and family for their quality and readability."

== Timeline ==
For the 2023 awards, announced in 2024 for books published predominantly in 2023, the timeline was:

- 1 December 2022 to 30 November 2023: Publication date for eligible books
- 19 June 2023 - 21 July 2023: Submission of entries
- 21 November 2023: Shortlists announced
- 30 January 2024: Category winners announced
- 14 March 2024: Golden Nero overall winner announced

A similar pattern of eligibility and submission dates has been announced for the 2024 awards.

== Shortlists and winners ==
The overall winner for each year is shown in boldface, and category winners are indicated by highlighted rows.

Year	Author	Title	Publisher	Result	Ref.
2023	**Paul Murray**	**The Bee Sting**	**Hamish Hamilton**	**Overall winner** **Fiction winner**	
2023	Eleanor Catton	Birnam Wood	Granta	Fiction shortlist	
2023	Megan Nolan	Ordinary Human Failings	Jonathan Cape	Fiction shortlist	
2023	Karen Powell	Fifteen Wild Decembers	Europa	Fiction shortlist	
2023	Michael Magee	Close to Home	Hamish Hamilton	Debut fiction winner	
2023	Stephen Buoro	The Five Sorrowful Mysteries of Andy Africa	Bloomsbury	Debut fiction shortlist	
2023	Tom Crewe	The New Life	Chatto & Windus	Debut fiction shortlist	
2023	Chloe Michelle Howarth	Sunburn	Verve	Debut fiction shortlist	
2023	Beth Lincoln	The Swifts	Puffin	Children's fiction winner	
2023	Lex Croucher	Gwen and Art Are Not in Love	Bloomsbury	Children's fiction shortlist	
2023	Kat Dunn	Bitterthorn	Andersen Press	Children's fiction shortlist	
2023	Candy Gourlay	Wild Song	David Fickling	Children's fiction shortlist	
2023	Fern Brady	Strong Female Character	Brazen	Non-fiction winner	
2023	Freya Bromley	The Tidal Year	Coronet	Non-fiction shortlist	
2023	Natasha Carthew	Undercurrent	Coronet	Non-fiction shortlist	
2023	Victoria Smith	Hags	Fleet	Non-fiction shortlist	
2024
2024	**Sophie Elmhirst**	**Maurice and Maralyn**	**Chatto & Windus**	**Overall winner** **Non-fiction winner**	
2024	Ellen Atlanta	Pixel Flesh	Headline	Non-fiction shortlist	
2024	Zeinab Badawi	An African History of Africa	W. H. Allen & Co.	Non-fiction shortlist	
2024	Orlando Whitfield	All That Glitters	Profile Books	Non-fiction shortlist	
2024	Adam S. Leslie	Lost in the Garden	Dead Ink	Fiction winner	
2024	Suzannah Dunn	Levitation for Beginners	Abacus	Fiction shortlist	
2024	Jo Hamya	The Hypocrite	Weidenfeld & Nicolson	Fiction shortlist	
2024	Donal Ryan	Heart, Be at Peace	Doubleday	Fiction shortlist	
2024	Colin Barrett	Wild Houses	Jonathan Cape	Debut fiction winner	
2024	Lara Haworth	Monumenta	Canongate Books	Debut fiction shortlist	
2024	Ferdia Lennon	Glorious Exploits	Fig Tree	Debut fiction shortlist	
2024	Orlaine McDonald	No Small Thing	Serpent's Tail	Debut fiction shortlist	
2024	Liz Hyder (illus. Tom de Freston)	The Twelve	Pushkin Press	Children's fiction winner	
2024	Catherine Bruton	Bird Boy	Nosy Crow	Children's fiction shortlist	
2024	Scarlet Dunmore	How to Survive a Horror Movie	Little Tiger	Children's fiction shortlist	
2024	Patrick Ness (illus. Tim Miller)	Chronicles of a Lizard Nobody	Walker Books	Children's fiction shortlist	
2025
2025	**Claire Lynch**	**A Family Matter**	**Chatto & Windus**	**Overall winner** **Debut fiction winner**	
2025	Ben Pester	The Expansion Project	Granta	Debut fiction shortlist	
2025	Rochelle Dowden-Lord	Lush	Penguin	Debut fiction shortlist	
2025	George Harrison	Season	Bloomsbury	Debut fiction shortlist	
2025	Benjamin Wood	Seascraper	Viking	Fiction winner	
2025	Oyinkan Braithwaite	Cursed Daughters	Atlantic Books	Fiction shortlist	
2025	Ian McEwan	What We Can Know	Jonathan Cape	Fiction shortlist	
2025	Damian Barr	The Two Roberts	Canongate Books	Fiction shortlist	
2025	Sarah Perry	Death of an Ordinary Man	Jonathan Cape	Non-fiction winner	
2025	Lyse Doucet	The Finest Hotel in Kabul	Weidenfeld & Nicolson	Non-fiction shortlist	
2025	James Fox	Craftland	Allen Lane	Non-fiction shortlist	
2025	Horatio Clare	We Came by Sea	Little, Brown	Non-fiction shortlist	
2025	Jamila Gavin	My Soul, A Shining Tree	Egmont Books	Children's fiction winner	
2025	Patrice Lawrence	People Like Stars	Scholastic	Children's fiction shortlist	
2025	Struan Murray	Dragonborn	Penguin	Children's fiction shortlist	
2025	Jenny Pearson	Shrapnel Boys	Usborne	Children's fiction shortlist	
