= An Evening of Long Goodbyes =

2003 novel by Paul Murray

- First Edition Cover
- Author: Paul Murray
- Cover artist: Lyndon Hayes
- Language: English
- Genre: Novel
- Publisher: Hamish Hamilton
- Publication date: 1 May 2003
- Publication place: United Kingdom
- Media type: Print (hardcover and paperback)
- Pages: 432 pp (hardback); 466 pp (paperback)
- ISBN: 0-241-14181-8

An Evening of Long Goodbyes is a 2003 comic novel by Irish author Paul Murray. It was shortlisted for the 2003 Whitbread First Novel Award and for the 2003 Kerry Group Irish Fiction Award.

== Synopsis ==
An Evening of Long Goodbyes is about a 24-year-old wealthy layabout who prefers to watch Gene Tierney movies in his chaise longue, with a gimlet in hand, rather than go out and find a job.

Charles Hythloday is a Trinity College dropout living with his sister, Christabel ("Bel"), in their parents' mansion, Amaurot (named after the capital city of More's Utopia). There are only two things that Charles loves more than the film actress, Gene Tierney: his home and his struggling actress sister. While Charles loves his childhood home, Bel notices it makes people become phony, and wants out of the mansion. Charles argues that his time is well spent building a folly in the back garden and perfecting sprezzatura, the art of acting like a gentleman while making it appear like one is doing nothing at all. Charles dreams of a return to a time when men wear top coats and women have white gloves.

But the fantasy ends when the bills pile up and the bank threatens to repossess the house. Charles devises a plan to blow up the folly, fake his death, use the insurance money to save Amaurot and move to South America. His plans go awry when he finds out that his Bosnian maid, Mrs P, has her children living in the folly. The folly explodes and a large stone gargoyle falls on Charles's head, putting him into a coma for a few weeks. He dreams of living in Chile with W. B. Yeats, where they spend their time perfecting sprezzatura, drinking gimlets, wearing sombreros, and tending the vineyard.

Eventually, Charles is forced to work in a Latvian factory. In his spare time, Charles pens a play entitled There's Bosnians in my Attic! A Tragedy in Five Acts. The Latvian factory suddenly upgrades and swindles its employees out of their wages, leaving Charlie and hundreds of immigrants jobless. In order to make some fast cash, Charles lays down all his winnings on the local underdog, An Evening of Long Goodbyes, who narrowly wins the race despite being severely injured in the process. Affected by the little dog's plight, Charles decides to give him to Bel to smooth their rift.

Charles is shocked to learn that Bel is planning a trip to Chekhov's home town in Russia to study The Cherry Orchard, her favorite play. The next morning, however, Bel drives her car into a wall at full speed, smashing through the windshield and flying into the sea. The circumstances surrounding her death are strange and mysterious, and life for everyone in the house falls into disarray. Charles takes a night job, sweeping the floor of a factory. He has begun writing a novel describing his fall from wealth, and that he likes his new life, in a way.

One night, he finds Bel's mobile phone and receives a mysterious call from her. She says that she might come back to him one day, and Charles ends his story walking out into his decayed Ireland, bleakly anticipating her return.

== Reception ==
The book has received good reviews. Stephen Amidon in The New York Times said that Murray "writes with the cunning and confidence of a seasoned pro", and that "the novel achieves an unexpected poignancy". A reviewer for RTÉ described the book as "cleverly written".

== Film adaptation ==
A film adaptation, with a script by Kieran Carney, was in development during 2012 by Subotica Films.
