= Survival training =

Survival training is a theoretical and physical practice where participants aim to survive in the wilderness with as little means as possible. Survival training is used to teach survival skills or as a form of recreational activity in which individuals are generally challenged to sustain their basic needs, such as food, water and shelter, in an unpopulated area, with little or only natural resources. This could include taking long hikes, lighting fires, setting camps, sailing in canoes or rafts, fishing, biking (for example with mountain bikes) and so on. Survival trainings are mostly held in forests, mountain ranges and hilly areas, such as the Alps and Scandinavia.

Different organizations coordinate recreational survival trainings, some of which are for children. They are popular as business excursions, team building exercises or as a holiday activity. Survival training in a recreational context has the intention to help expand team work or strengthen the bond of a group by challenging team members, but can also be practiced alone.

== See also ==
- Survivalism
