= Jesús Vidaña =

Man lost at sea for a substantial amount of time, eventually rescued

- Born: Mexico
- Occupation: Fisherman
- Known for: Surviving nine months out at sea on a raft
- Spouse: Yumei Yoselyn
- Children: 2

Jesús Vidaña is a fisherman from Mexico. He, together with Lucio Rendón and Salvador Ordóñez, left a Mexican fishing port in October 2005 and survived nine months adrift in a fishing boat in the Pacific Ocean before being rescued in August 2006.

== Lost at sea ==
Just before sunrise on 28 October 2005, Rendón, Ordóñez and Vidaña, along with two other seafarers, left the Mexican port of San Blas, Nayarit, to catch sharks 30 mi (48 km) south of the Islas Marías in a 28-foot (8.5 m) fiberglass boat. But they exhausted their fuel and strong easterly winds cast them adrift in the Northern Equatorial Current which crosses the Pacific Ocean from Mexico to the Philippines. Rendón's family searched for several weeks, but the castaways were blown out into the high seas too fast and could not be found. Without a radio, the fishermen had no way to raise help.

=== Surviving nine months adrift ===
The three survived for nine months on raw fish, seagulls, and sea turtles and by collecting rain in empty gasoline containers. This was scarce during the first month, but with the onset of winter, bringing successive cold fronts and showers, their survival was enabled. However, two other companions, including the vessel's owner, died from starvation after two months.

=== Sailing across the Pacific Ocean ===
Although they thought they were drifting aimlessly, the survivors had followed exactly the same path that the Nao de China travelled in the 17th century from Acapulco to Manila. Hope returned to the stranded fishermen when they saw planes flying from the west. They realized that it would be easier to cross the ocean to the west, rather than attempting to turn into the wind to return to Mexico. They fashioned a sail with blankets and continued westwards, following the wind and the currents. Over 270 days their average speed was 4 km/h (2.5 mph).

The men made fishing hooks with strings and wire from the engine, and caught turtles by diving into the ocean with a rope tied to their waists. They ate everything: meat, blood, bones, eggs, and so survived for nine months crossing two thirds of the Pacific Ocean (more than 8,800 km (5,500 mi)) westwards.

=== Rescue at sea ===
On 9 August 2006, their boat was spotted on the radar of a Taiwanese tuna fishing vessel, Koo's 102, at a distance of 20 mi (32 km). The captain ordered the crew to sail towards the signal to investigate, thinking the radar signal was too strong to be a group of sea gulls. Soon they reached the stranded boat and picked up the three surviving fishermen around 14:00 local time at a point located 200 mi (320 km) east of the Marshall Islands. The survivors were reported to be "very thin and hungry, but otherwise healthy". The sailors of the Taiwanese boat took them aboard and gave them food, medical care, and clothes and had them rest for the 13 days until they disembarked in Majuro, Marshall Islands, on 22 August 2006, where they were handed over to the local authorities and later to an official from the Mexican embassy in New Zealand, who arranged to have them flown back to Mexico.

=== Back home ===
They arrived back in Mexico on 27 August 2006, and after visiting their families they went back to San Blas to continue with shark fishing.

Yumei Yoselyn, Jesús Vidaña's 21-year-old wife, was pregnant when her 27-year-old husband got lost at sea. She also had a four-year-old child. Some suspected that the fishermen were involved in drug-smuggling, which all of them adamantly denied. In Mexico, shark-fishing permits are expensive, so small fishing boats that sail out into the sea to catch sharks often do not inform port authorities of their leaving.

== See also ==
- List of people who disappeared mysteriously at sea
