= Rose-Noëlle =

Trimaran that capsized on June 4, 1989

History
- Name: Rose-Noëlle
- Route: Picton to Tonga
- Fate: Capsized at 6am on June 4, 1989 by a rogue wave, drifted for 119 days and sank at Little Waterfall Bay

General characteristics
- Type: Trimaran
- Tonnage: 6.5 tons
- Length: 12.6 m

Map of the last voyage

Rose-Noëlle was a trimaran that capsized at 6 AM on June 4, 1989, in the southern Pacific Ocean off the coast of New Zealand. Four men (John Glennie, James Nalepka, Rick Hellriegel and Phil Hoffman) survived adrift on the wreckage of the ship for 119 days.

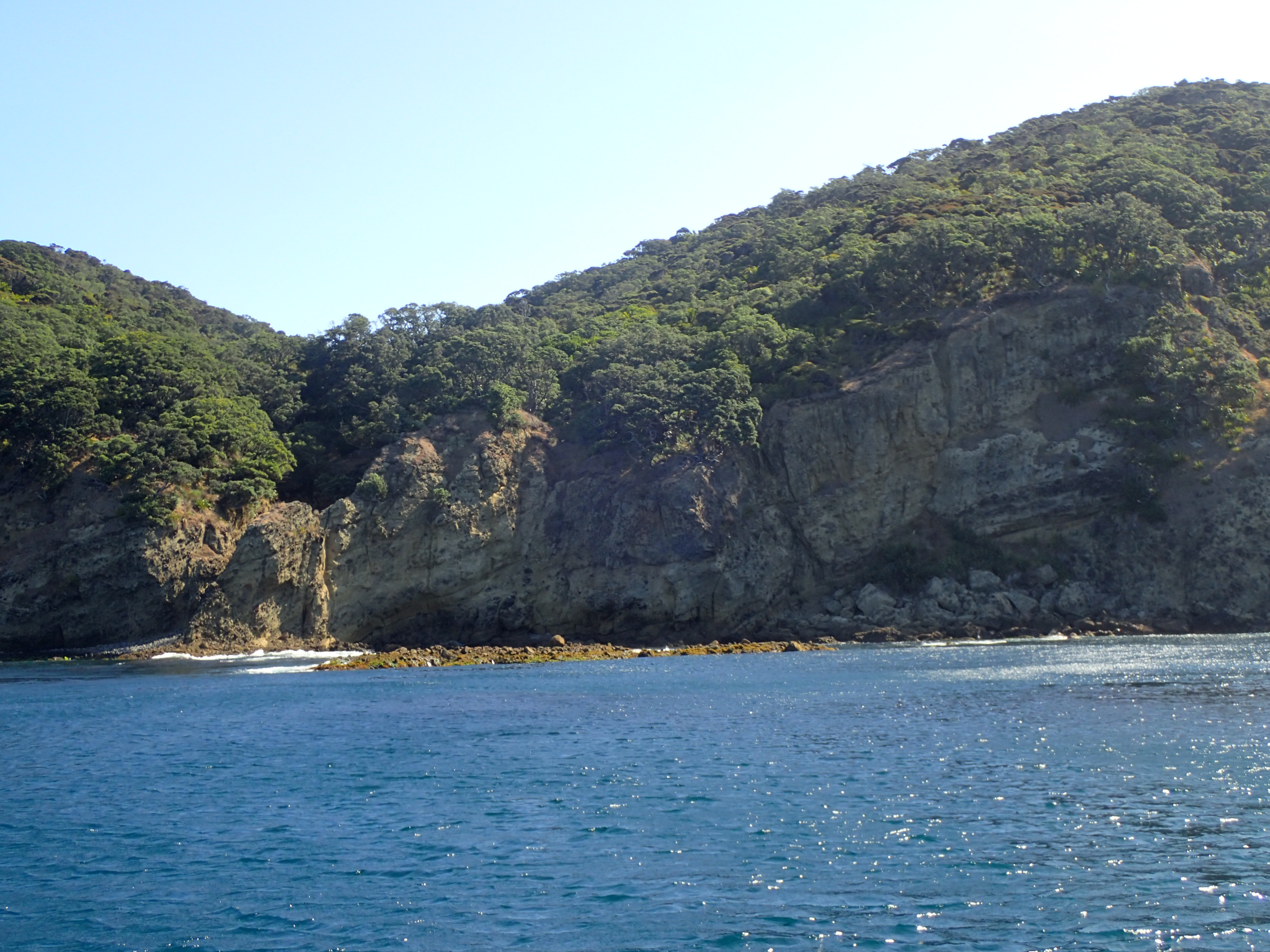
Landing place of the Rose-Noëlle at Little Waterfall Bay on Great Barrier Island, New Zealand

== Capsize and survival ==
After being hit by a rogue wave during a storm, the trimaran capsized, trapping the crew inside. After cutting an escape hatch, they set the emergency position-indicating radiobeacon (EPIRB), convinced that they would be rescued a few days later. The water tanks, which contained 140 liters of fresh water, slowly emptied themselves unbeknown to the crew. The EPIRB, which had a radius of one hundred nautical miles, stopped working on June 13 after 8 days. They made a rain water collecting device by splitting lengths of plastic pipe. After about 2–3 months, barnacles and mollusks began to grow on the hulls, making fishing easier.

== In popular culture ==
Their story is told in the 2015 New Zealand television film Abandoned, starring Dominic Purcell and Peter Feeney, along with Owen Black and Greg Johnson. It was directed by John Laing.

=== Actors ===
- Dominic Purcell as James Nalepka
- Peter Feeney as John Glennie, owner of Rose-Noëlle
- Owen Black as Rick Hellriegel
- Greg Johnson as Phil Hoffman
- Siobhan Marshall as Martha
- Daniel Cleary as Laing
- Serena Cotton as Heather
- Rachel Nash as Karen Hoffman

== See also ==
- List of people who disappeared mysteriously at sea
