= Bollinger Everyman Wodehouse Prize =

Annual British literary prize

- Awarded for: the funniest novel of the past 12 months, which best evokes the Wodehouse spirit of witty characters and perfectly timed comic phrases
- Country: United Kingdom
- Presented by: Bollinger and Everyman's Library
- First award: 2000; 26 years ago
- Website: http://www.everymanslibrary.co.uk/wodehouse.aspx

The Bollinger Everyman Wodehouse Prize is the United Kingdom's first literary award for comic literature. Established in 2000 and named in honour of P. G. Wodehouse, past winners include Paul Torday in 2007 with Salmon Fishing in the Yemen, Terry Pratchett for Snuff in 2012 and Jasper Fforde for The Well of Lost Plots in 2004. Gary Shteyngart was the first American winner in 2011, and 2020 saw a graphic novel take the prize for the first time.

The prize is sponsored and organised by Bollinger, a producer of sparkling wines from the Champagne region of France, and Everyman's Library, a book imprint that is a division of Random House.

Until 2019 the winner was announced at the annual Hay Festival. Winners receive a jeroboam of Champagne Bollinger Special Cuvée, a case of Bollinger La Grande Année and a complete set of the Everyman's Library P. G. Wodehouse collection. In addition, a Gloucestershire Old Spots pig is also named after the winning novel.

In 2025 Marina Lewycka was awarded the Vintage Bollinger prize for her 2005 winner A Short History of Tractors in Ukrainian. The prize marked the 25th anniversary of the award and was given to the best past winner.

== Winners and shortlists ==
The judges for the inaugural award were Stephen Fry, Craig Brown, Sebastian Faulks and Jo Brand.

Year	Author(s)	Title	Publisher	Result	Ref.
2000	Howard Jacobson	The Mighty Walzer	Jonathan Cape	Winner	
2000	Helen Fielding	Bridget Jones: The Edge of Reason	Viking Press	Shortlisted	
2000	Tony Hawks	Playing the Moldovans at Tennis	Ebury	Shortlisted	
2000	Hugh Massingberd	The Book of Obituaries	Pan Books	Shortlisted	
2000	Sue Townsend	Adrian Mole: The Cappuccino Years	Michael Joseph	Shortlisted	
2001	Jonathan Coe	The Rotters' Club	Viking Press	Winner	
2002	Michael Frayn	Spies	Faber and Faber	Winner	
2002	Terry Eagleton	The Gatekeeper	St. Martin's Press	Shortlisted	
2002	Lissa Evans	Spencer's List	Viking Press	Shortlisted	
2002	Will Ferguson	Happiness™	Canongate	Shortlisted	
2002	Dave Gorman & Danny Wallace	Are You Dave Gorman?	Ebury	Shortlisted	
2002	Terry Pratchett	Thief of Time	Doubleday	Shortlisted	
2003	DBC Pierre	Vernon God Little	Faber and Faber	Winner	
2003	Lucy Ellmann	Dot in the Universe	Bloomsbury	Shortlisted	
2003	India Knight	Don't You Want Me	Penguin Books	Shortlisted	
2003	Yann Martel	Life of Pi	Knopf Canada	Shortlisted	
2003	Allison Pearson	I Don't Know How She Does It	Chatto & Windus	Shortlisted	
2003	Zadie Smith	The Autograph Man	Hamish Hamilton	Shortlisted	
2004	Jasper Fforde	The Well of Lost Plots	Hodder & Stoughton	Winner	
2004	Andrey Kurkov	Penguin Lost	Vintage Books	Shortlisted	
2004	Deborah Moggach	These Foolish Things	Vintage Books	Shortlisted	
2004	Alexei Sayle	Overtaken	Sceptre	Shortlisted	
2005	Marina Lewycka	A Short History of Tractors in Ukrainian	Viking Press	Winner	
2005	James Hamilton-Paterson	Cooking with Fernet Branca	Faber and Faber	Shortlisted	
2005	Lloyd Jones	Mr Vogel	Seren	Shortlisted	
2005	Tiffany Murray	Happy Accidents	Harper Perennial	Shortlisted	
2005	Terry Pratchett	Going Postal	Doubleday	Shortlisted	
2005	Malcolm Pryce	The Unbearable Lightness of Being in Aberystwyth	Bloomsbury	Shortlisted	
2006	Christopher Brookmyre	All Fun and Games Until Somebody Loses an Eye	Abacus Books	Winner	
2006	Jilly Cooper	Wicked!	Bantam Press	Shortlisted	
2006	Robert Lewis	The Last Llanelli Train	Serpent's Tail	Shortlisted	
2006	John O'Farrell	May Contain Nuts	Doubleday	Shortlisted	
2006	Terry Pratchett	Thud!	Doubleday	Shortlisted	
2006	Zadie Smith	On Beauty	Hamish Hamilton	Shortlisted	
2007	Paul Torday	Salmon Fishing in the Yemen	Weidenfeld & Nicolson	Winner	
2007	Howard Jacobson	Kalooki Nights	Jonathan Cape	Shortlisted	
2007	Marina Lewycka	Two Caravans	Penguin Books, Fig Tree	Shortlisted	
2007	David Nobbs	Cupid's Dart	Heinemann	Shortlisted	
2008	Will Self	The Butt	Bloomsbury	Winner	
2008	Alan Bennett	The Uncommon Reader	Faber and Faber	Shortlisted	
2008	Joe Dunthorne	Submarine	Hamish Hamilton	Shortlisted	
2008	Julian Gough	Jude: Level 1	Old Street	Shortlisted	
2008	Garrison Keillor	Pontoon: A Novel of Lake Wobegon	Viking Press	Shortlisted	
2008	John Walsh	Sunday at the Cross Bones	Harper Perennial	Shortlisted	
2009	Geoff Dyer	Jeff in Venice, Death in Varanasi	Canongate Books	Winner	
2009	Christopher Brookmyre	A Snowball in Hell	Little, Brown and Company	Shortlisted	
2009	Lissa Evans	Their Finest Hour and a Half	Transworld / Doubleday	Shortlisted	
2009	James Hamilton-Paterson	Rancid Pansies	Faber and Faber	Shortlisted	
2009	Saša Stanišić	How the Soldier Repairs the Gramophone	Weidenfeld & Nicolson	Shortlisted	
2009	Steve Toltz	A Fraction of the Whole	Hamish Hamilton	Shortlisted	
2010	Ian McEwan	Solar	Jonathan Cape	Winner	
2010	Paul Murray	Skippy Dies	Hamish Hamilton	Shortlisted	
2010	Tiffany Murray	Diamond Star Halo	Portobello	Shortlisted	
2010	David Nicholls	One Day	Hodder & Stoughton	Shortlisted	
2010	Malcolm Pryce	From Aberystwyth with Love	Bloomsbury	Shortlisted	
2011	Gary Shteyngart	Super Sad True Love Story	Granta	Winner	
2011	Manu Joseph	Serious Men	John Murray	Shortlisted	
2011	India Knight	Comfort and Joy	Penguin Books, Fig Tree	Shortlisted	
2011	Sam Leith	The Coincidence Engine	Bloomsbury	Shortlisted	
2011	Catherine O'Flynn	The News Where You Are	Penguin Books	Shortlisted	
2012	Terry Pratchett	Snuff	Transworld / Doubleday	Winner	
2012	Julian Gough	Jude in London	Old Street	Shortlisted	
2012	John Lanchester	Capital	W. W. Norton	Shortlisted	
2012	John O'Farrell	The Man Who Forgot His Wife	Doubleday	Shortlisted	
2012	Sue Townsend	The Woman Who Went to Bed for a Year	Michael Joseph	Shortlisted	
2013	Howard Jacobson	Zoo Time	Bloomsbury	Winner	
2013	Joseph Connolly	England's Lane	Quercus	Shortlisted	
2013	Helen DeWitt	Lightning Rods (and Other Stories)	New Directions	Shortlisted	
2013	Michael Frayn	Skios	Faber and Faber	Shortlisted	
2013	Deborah Moggach	Heartbreak Hotel	Chatto & Windus	Shortlisted	
2014	Edward St Aubyn	Lost for Words	Picador	Winner	
2014	Sebastian Faulks	Jeeves and the Wedding Bells	Hutchinson	Shortlisted	
2014	Helen Fielding	Bridget Jones: Mad About the Boy	Jonathan Cape	Shortlisted	
2014	Hanif Kureishi	The Last Word	Faber and Faber	Shortlisted	
2014	John Niven	Straight White Male	Heinemann	Shortlisted	
2014	Joseph O'Connor	The Thrill of it All	Harvill Secker	Shortlisted	
2015	Alexander McCall Smith	Fatty O'Leary's Dinner Party	Polygon	Winner	
2015	Helen Lederer	Losing It	Pan Macmillan	Shortlisted	
2015	Caitlin Moran	How to Build a Girl	Ebury	Shortlisted	
2015	Joseph O'Neill	The Dog	4th Estate	Shortlisted	
2015	Nina Stibbe	Man at the Helm	Viking Press, Penguin Books	Shortlisted	
2015	Irvine Welsh	A Decent Ride	Jonathan Cape	Shortlisted	
2016	Paul Murray	The Mark and the Void	Penguin Books	Winner (tie)	
2016	Hannah Rothschild	The Improbability of Love	Bloomsbury	Winner (tie)	
2016	Paul Beatty	The Sellout	Oneworld Publications	Shortlisted	
2016	Marina Lewycka	The Lubetkin Legacy	Penguin Random House	Shortlisted	
2016	John O'Farrell	There's Only Two David Beckhams	Black Swan, Transworld	Shortlisted	
2017	Helen Fielding	Bridget Jones's Baby	Vintage Books	Winner	
2017	Carl Hiaasen	Razor Girl	Little, Brown and Company	Shortlisted	
2017	James Robertson	To Be Continued...	Penguin Random House	Shortlisted	
2017	Richard Russo	Everybody's Fool	Atlantic Books	Shortlisted	
2017	Nina Stibbe	Paradise Lodge	Penguin Random House	Shortlisted	
2017	Simon Wroe	Here Comes Trouble	Orion Books	Shortlisted	
2018	Not awarded				
2019	Nina Stibbe	Reasons to be Cheerful	Little, Brown and Company	Winner	
2019	Jen Beagin	Vacuum in the Dark	Simon & Schuster	Shortlisted	
2019	Kate Davies	In at the Deep End	Houghton Mifflin Harcourt	Shortlisted	
2019	Roddy Doyle	Charlie Savage	Jonathan Cape	Shortlisted	
2019	Lissa Evans	Old Baggage	Harper Perennial	Shortlisted	
2019	Paul Ewen	Francis Plug: Writer in Residence	Galley Beggar Press	Shortlisted	
2020	Matthew Dooley	Flake	Jonathan Cape	Winner	
2020	Oisín Fagan	Nobber	John Murray	Shortlisted	
2020	Jessica Francis Kane	Rules for Visiting	Granta	Shortlisted	
2020	Jenny Offill	Weather	Granta	Shortlisted	
2020	Alastair Puddick	46% Better than Dave	Raven Crest Books	Shortlisted	
2020	Hannah Rothschild	House of Trelawney	Bloomsbury	Shortlisted	
2021	Guy Kennaway	The Accidental Collector	Mensch	Winner	
2021	Dolly Alderton	Ghosts	Penguin Books	Shortlisted	
2021	A. Naji Bakhti	Between Beirut and the Moon	Influx Press	Shortlisted	
2021	Diksha Basu	Destination Wedding	Bloomsbury	Shortlisted	
2021	Hilary Leichter	Temporary	Faber and Faber	Shortlisted	
2021	Lauren Oyler	Fake Accounts	4th Estate	Shortlisted	
2022	Percival Everett	The Trees	Influx Press	Winner	
2022	John Boyne	The Echo Chamber	Doubleday	Shortlisted	
2022	Zakiya Dalila Harris	The Other Black Girl	Bloomsbury	Shortlisted	
2022	Marian Keyes	Again, Rachel	Penguin Books, Michael Joseph	Shortlisted	
2022	Andrew Lipstein	Last Resort	Weidenfeld & Nicolson	Shortlisted	
2022	Sarah Lotz	Impossible	HarperCollins	Shortlisted	
2022	Phoebe Luckhurst	The Lock-in	Penguin Books, Michael Joseph	Shortlisted	
2022	Lucy Mangan	Are We Having Fun Yet?	Profile	Shortlisted	
2022	Richard Osman	The Man Who Died Twice	Viking Press	Shortlisted	
2022	Gary Shteyngart	Our Country Friends	Atlantic Books	Shortlisted	
2022	Nina Stibbe	One Day I Shall Astonish the World	Viking Press	Shortlisted	
2022	Joy Williams	Harrow	Profile	Shortlisted	
2023	Bob Mortimer	The Satsuma Complex	Gallery Books	Winner	
2023	Fergus Craig	Murder at Crime Manor	Sphere	Shortlisted	
2023	James Hannaham	Didn't Nobody Give a Shit What Happened to Carlotta	Europa Editions	Shortlisted	
2023	Aravind Jayan	Teen Couple Have Fun Outdoors	Serpent's Tail	Shortlisted	
2023	India Knight	Darling	Fig Tree	Shortlisted	
2023	Sophie McCartney	Mother Hens	HarperNorth	Shortlisted	
2024	Ferdia Lennon	Glorious Exploits	Fig Tree	Winner	
2024	Dolly Alderton	Good Material	Fig Tree	Shortlisted	
2024	Kaliane Bradley	The Ministry of Time	Sceptre	Shortlisted	
2024	Andrew Hunter Murray	A Beginner's Guide to Breaking and Entering	Hutchinson Heinemann	Shortlisted	
2024	Caroline O'Donoghue	The Rachel Incident	Virago	Shortlisted	
2024	David Nicholls	You Are Here	Sceptre	Shortlisted	
2024	Jen Sugden and Chris Sugden	High Vaultage	Gollancz	Shortlisted	
2025	Rosanna Pike	A Little Trickerie	Penguin Random House	Winner	
2025	Richard Ayoade	The Unfinished Harauld Hughes	Faber & Faber	Shortlisted	
2025	Kate Greathead	The Book of George	Atlantic Books	Shortlisted	
2025	Guy Jenkin	Murder Most Foul	Legend Press	Shortlisted	
2025	Sanam Mahloudji	The Persians	Fourth Estate	Shortlisted	
2025	Alexander Sammartino	Last Acts	ONE	Shortlisted	
2025	Sandi Toksvig	Friends of Dorothy	Virago	Shortlisted	
2025	Nussaibah Younis	Fundamentally	Weidenfeld & Nicolson	Shortlisted	
2026	Mona Awad	We Love You, Bunny	Simon & Schuster	Shortlisted	
2026	Anna Brook-Mitchell	Motherfaker	Pan Macmillan	Shortlisted	
2026	Sophie Irwin	How To Lose a Lord in Ten Days	HarperCollins	Shortlisted	
2026	Luke Kennard	Black Bag	John Murray Press	Shortlisted	
2026	Kirsten King	A Good Person	Little, Brown Book Group	Shortlisted	
2026	Avigayl Sharp	Offseason	Orion	Shortlisted	
