= McCartney (surname) =

McCartney or Macartney (Irish: Mac Cartaine) is a surname. Notable people with the surname include:

- Paul McCartney (born 1942), English singer/songwriter with bands The Beatles and Wings
  - Mike McCartney (born 1944), Paul McCartney's brother, singer and photographer
  - Linda McCartney (1941–1998), American musician and photographer, Paul McCartney's first wife
  - Heather McCartney (born 1962), Linda McCartney's daughter, adopted by Paul McCartney
  - Mary McCartney (born 1969), British photographer, Paul and Linda McCartney's daughter
  - Stella McCartney (born 1971), British fashion designer, Paul and Linda McCartney's daughter
  - James McCartney (born 1977), British musician, Paul and Linda McCartney's son
  - Sophie McCartney, English comedian and novelist, cousin of Paul McCartney
  - John McCartney, fictional grandfather of Paul McCartney, played by Wilfrid Brambell in A Hard Day's Night (film)
- Andrew McCartney, Scottish footballer
- Bill McCartney (1940–2025), American evangelist and former football coach
- Billy McCartney (born 1947), Scottish footballer
- Branville McCartney (born 1967), Bahamian politician
- Charlie Macartney (1886–1958), Australian cricketer
- Clarence Edward Noble Macartney, a conservative Presbyterian pastor and author
- Daniel McCartney (1817–1887), mental calculator
- Dave McCartney (footballer) (1875–1949), Scottish footballer
- Edith Hyde Robbins Macartney (1895–1978), first Miss America
- Edward Henry Macartney (1863–1956) solicitor and politician in Queensland
- Eliza McCartney, New Zealand pole vaulter
- Forrest S. McCartney, American general and NASA manager
- Frederic O. MacCartney (1864–1903), Massachusetts socialist politician
- George Macartney, 1st Earl Macartney (1737–1806), British statesman, colonial administrator and diplomat
- George McCartney (footballer), Northern Ireland footballer
- George Macartney (British consul), British consul-general in Kashgar in China at the end of the nineteenth century
- Halliday McCartney, British military surgeon and civil servant for the Qing Dynasty
- Harold McCartney, English former professional rugby league footballer
- Hussey Macartney (1879–1894), Dean of St. Paul's Cathedral, Melbourne
- Ian McCartney, Canadian political essayist and baseball enthusiast
- Innes McCartney, nautical archaeologist, author and television contributor
- Jesse McCartney, (born 1987) American pop singer, songwriter, actor, and voice actor.
- John Ellison-Macartney, (1818–1904) Irish politician
- Sir John Macartney, 1st Baronet (died 1812), Irish politician and first of the Macartney baronets
- John McCartney (footballer born 1866) (1866–1933), Scottish player and manager
- John McCartney (footballer born 1870) (1870–1942), Scottish player for Liverpool
- Kate McCartney, Australian comedian, actress, and producer, one of "the Kates" with Kate McLennan
- Mike McCartney (footballer) (1954–2018), Scottish footballer, formerly manager of Gretna FC
- Paula McCartney (born 1971), American artist
- Raymond McCartney, Northern Ireland politician
- Robert McCartney (Australian politician) (1906–1978)
- Robert McCartney (Northern Irish politician) (born 1936), Northern Irish unionist politician
- Robert McCartney (1971–2005), victim of Murder of Robert McCartney in Northern Ireland
- Scott Macartney, American alpine skier
- Tom McCartney, New Zealand Rugby player
- William Ellison-Macartney, British politician
- William McCartney (footballer), Scottish footballer
- Willie McCartney (died 1948), Scottish football manager

== See also ==
- McCartney (disambiguation)
- McCartan
- McCarthy
