= Fishing in Yemen =

The fishing industry in Yemen has considerable potential but is vastly under-exploited. In 1998, the fishing sector employed some 41,000 people, mainly family-owned businesses operating small vessels. In 1998, 127,000 tons of fish were caught in Yemen. Proximity to the havens of the Somali pirates has had a discouraging effect.

== Popular culture ==
Paul Torday wrote a comic novel, Salmon Fishing in the Yemen, published in 2007, about a westerner's commission to introduce salmon to the wadis of the Yemen highlands. The book was adapted into a film of the same name in 2011.

== See also ==
- Water supply and sanitation in Yemen
