= Salmon Fishing in the Yemen =

2011 British romantic comedy-drama film

- Theatrical release poster
- Directed by: Lasse Hallström
- Screenplay by: Simon Beaufoy
- Based on: Salmon Fishing in the Yemen by Paul Torday
- Produced by: Paul Webster
- Starring: Ewan McGregor; Emily Blunt; Kristin Scott Thomas; Amr Waked
- Cinematography: Terry Stacey
- Edited by: Lisa Gunning
- Music by: Dario Marianelli
- Production companies: Lionsgate UK; UK Film Council; BBC Films; Kudos Pictures; Davis Films
- Distributed by: CBS Films; (United States); Lionsgate UK; (United Kingdom)
- Release dates: 10 September 2011 (TIFF); 20 April 2012 (United Kingdom)
- Running time: 107 minutes
- Country: United Kingdom
- Language: English
- Budget: $14.4 million
- Box office: $34.6 million

Salmon Fishing in the Yemen is a 2011 British romantic comedy drama film directed by Lasse Hallström. The film stars Ewan McGregor, Emily Blunt, Kristin Scott Thomas and Amr Waked. Based on the 2007 novel by Paul Torday, and a screenplay by Simon Beaufoy, the film is about a fisheries expert who is recruited by a consultant to help realise a sheikh's vision of bringing the sport of fly fishing to the Yemen desert, initiating an upstream journey of faith to make the impossible possible. The film was shot on location in the United Kingdom in London and Newtonmore in Inverness-shire and in Morocco from August to October 2010. The film premiered at the 2011 Toronto International Film Festival. The film received generally positive reviews upon its release, and earned over $34 million in revenue worldwide.

== Plot ==
Fisheries expert Alfred Jones receives an email from financial adviser Harriet Chetwode-Talbot, seeking advice on a project to bring salmon fishing to Yemen—a project being bankrolled by a wealthy Yemeni sheikh and supported by the Foreign and Commonwealth Office. Alfred dismisses the project as "fundamentally unfeasible" because Yemen cannot provide the necessary environment for salmon. Meanwhile, the British Prime Minister's press secretary, Patricia Maxwell, suggests the salmon fishing story to the Prime Minister's office as a positive story to help improve relations between Britain and the Islamic world.

Alfred meets Harriet to discuss the project, but despite Harriet correcting his misconceptions of Yemen's environment, Alfred is convinced that the project is foolhardy. Alfred's boss, under pressure from Patricia, forces Alfred to accept a position on the project. Alfred considers resigning rather than ruin his reputation in the scientific community, but is convinced by his wife that they need his income and pension.

Harriet arranges for Alfred to meet the Sheikh at his estate in the Scottish Highlands. The Sheikh is excited to meet Alfred as he is the inventor of the "Woolly Jones" fishing fly. While the Sheikh acknowledges that the project might sound crazy, he still believes that fishing is a noble pursuit that promotes harmony and requires immense faith.

After his wife accepts a position in Geneva, Alfred devotes himself to the salmon project. Although painfully shy, (Note: Alfred exhibits some symptoms associated with Asperger syndrome, an autism spectrum disorder (ASD) characterized by significant difficulties in social interaction, and restricted and repetitive patterns of behaviour and interests. In one scene, Harriet mocks his overly-formal behaviour as a sign of Asperger's.) he enjoys working with Harriet and they begin to make progress. Their enthusiasm is interrupted, however, when Harriet learns that her new boyfriend, British special forces Captain Robert Meyers, is missing in action. Devastated, Harriet withdraws to her apartment. When Alfred visits her, she gets upset, thinking he just wants her to return to work, but then she realises he has come to comfort her, and the two embrace.

Meanwhile, the Sheikh continues his work, despite radical Islamists who accuse him of introducing Western culture to the region. Patricia informs the Sheikh that because of opposition to removing salmon from British rivers they will need to use farmed salmon. The Sheikh does not believe that salmon bred in captivity will survive in the wild and rejects Patricia's offer, ending the British Government's involvement in the project. Alfred resigns his government job to continue with the project.

After a confrontation with his wife in which he realises that their marriage is over and that he is in love with Harriet, Alfred convinces the Sheikh to give the farmed salmon a try. As the two are fishing, a Yemeni radical attempts to assassinate the Sheikh, who is saved by Alfred casting his fishing line towards the assassin. Soon after, they return to Yemen to oversee the project, where Harriet and Alfred continue to grow closer. After a moonlight swim, he asks her if there was a "theoretical possibility" of the two of them ending up together. She accepts with a kiss on his cheek, but says she will need some time.

At a press conference in Yemen for the project, with the Foreign Secretary present, Patricia reunites Harriet with her boyfriend Robert who has survived the counter-terrorism operation. The PR stunt leaves Alfred heartbroken. That night, Harriet realises her feelings for Robert have changed, and when Alfred gets a text message from his wife asking him to return, he declines.

The following day the fish are released from their holding tanks. The fish swim upstream, and everyone celebrates the success of the project. While Robert and the Foreign Secretary fly-fish for the photographers, terrorists break into the dam upstream and open the flood gates. Although most people survive the resulting flash flood, the valley is left in ruins. The Sheikh blames himself for the tragedy, and vows to rebuild—this time with the support of the local community.

The next day, as Harriet prepares to leave with Robert, the latter says while she was the one thing on his mind that kept him alive during his mission, she doesn't owe him anything. She approaches Alfred to say goodbye, where he tearfully wishes her luck as he ponders what to do next. Just then, they see a salmon jumping from the water, indicating that some fish survived. Alfred tells Harriet he will indeed stay and help with the project rebuild. Harriet asks if he will need a partner—and Alfred realises that she is talking about herself. They embrace, and then hold hands whilst looking out over the river.

== Cast ==
- Ewan McGregor as Alfred "Fred" Jones
- Emily Blunt as Harriet Chetwode-Talbot
- Kristin Scott Thomas as Patricia Maxwell
- Amr Waked as Sheikh Muhammed bin Zaidi bani Tihama
- Tom Mison as Robert Mayers
- Conleth Hill as Bernard Sugden
- Rachael Stirling as Mary Jones
- Catherine Steadman as Ashley
- Hugh Simon as Foreign Secretary
- Clive Wood as Tom Price-Williams
- Tom Beard as Peter Maxwell
- Nayef Rashed as Rebel Leader
- Otto Farrant as Joshua Maxwell

== Production ==
=== Screenplay ===
The screenplay for Salmon Fishing in the Yemen was written by Simon Beaufoy, based on the novel by Paul Torday. The epistolary novel won the 2007 Bollinger Everyman Wodehouse Prize, and the 2008 Waverton Good Read Award. Through a series of letters and documents, Torday creates a political satire that focused more on the "art of political spin" than on the force of the human spirit. Beaufoy enjoyed the challenge of transforming a fairly complex novel written in an unusual format—a series of emails, text messages, interviews, and testimony extracts—into a film. Beaufoy acknowledged, "I just love adapting material that allows room for creativity and allows room for me to be very present in the process, I suppose. Sometimes when you’re adapting something classic and famous you have to adopt a different attitude, to something like Salmon Fishing where it had such an unusual narrative and such an unusual structure, that you got quite a free reign [sic] to do interesting things with it." Beaufoy integrated the emails, text messages, and chat texts into the film's narrative.

Beaufoy's screenplay is decidedly different from the novel in several respects. The most obvious difference is that his press secretary is a woman, played by Kristin Scott Thomas, whereas in the novel, the character is a man, Peter Maxwell. Where the novel focuses on political satire, the film is more about a man who decides to change direction in his life. In the novel, Jones is noticeably older than the film character, and the romantic subplot with Harriet is kept in the background because of the political satire. By making Jones younger, Beaufoy added a "quirky flair" to the character that gives the audience a "completely different experience in watching a man overcome himself to achieve happiness." Beaufoy noted, "That's the difference when reading the book. You can perceive specific conflicts, but when it's onscreen you have to create something different, something the audience can see and feel and root for."

=== Casting ===
For director Lasse Hallström, Ewan McGregor and Emily Blunt were his "first choices" to play the leading roles. "They brought the lightness and the humour to the material", Hallström later observed. He also felt fortunate to get Kristin Scott Thomas to play the role of the bossy press secretary, Patricia Maxwell, recalling, "I knew she could be funny, as most actors can, but she brought that seriousness combined with a bit of heart." For Hallström, it was that combination of humour and seriousness that allowed the actress to capture the balance between the film's sentiment and political satire. Egyptian actor Amr Waked was cast in the role of the sheikh. Waked has enjoyed major success and fame in his own country and throughout the Arabic-speaking world. English-speaking audiences may recognise him as the fundamentalist Muslim cleric in the 2005 film Syriana and the HBO series House Of Saddam.

=== Filming locations ===
Salmon Fishing in the Yemen was shot on location in London, Scotland, and Morocco. Scenes set in Yemen were filmed in Ouarzazate in the Moroccan Atlas Mountains. The restaurant scene in London was filmed at the Oxo Tower. The Sheikh's house in Scotland was filmed at Ardverikie House. Reshooting and water tank work was filmed at Black Hangar Studios in the UK. Principal photography started on 6 August 2010.

=== Music ===
Music for the film was composed and orchestrated by Dario Marianelli. The score features Leo Abrahams (guitar), Dirk Campbell (woodwind), Giles Lewin (oud), and the BBC Concert Orchestra, conducted by Benjamin Wallfisch. The original soundtrack album was released on 20 March 2012 by Lakeshore Records. The Scottish folksong "Mairi's Wedding" by The Clancy Brothers, which is played over one scene, and "Where You Go" by The Young Romans, the song played over the end credits, are not included on the album.

== Reception ==
=== Critical response ===
The film received generally favourable reviews from critics. In his review in the Los Angeles Times, Kenneth Turan called the film a "pleasant fantasy" and a "charming film whose few attempts at seriousness are best forgotten or ignored." Turan praised the performances of Emily Blunt and Ewan McGregor, concluding

Blunt and McGregor are two of the most gifted and attractive actors working today, able to play off each other with great style, and when they invest themselves in these amusing characters they bring to life the film's very contrived plot.

In her review for The Washington Post, Ann Hornaday gave the film two and a half out of four stars, calling the film an "absurdist but gently winning romantic comedy" that "works a strange kind of wonder". Hornaday praised the director's "assured hand and feather-light touch", as well as the acting performances by Ewan McGregor and Emily Blunt, who finds "an easygoing rhythm with her leading man". Hornaday continued:

It's the serendipity of creative juxtaposition that Hallström is clearly after in Salmon Fishing in the Yemen, from Scott Thomas spiking the honey with dollops of venom to the fabulous kilts and kaffiyehs worn by the sheik's bodyguards at his rustic Scottish redoubt. Salmon Fishing in the Yemen is less a classic fish-out-of-water tale than a fish-in-strange-waters tale, a study in diametric opposites that finds unexpected synchronies and moments of almost mystical harmony. Viewers who take the sheikh's advice and suspend their disbelief, even for a moment, may well find themselves hooked.

Hornaday found Salmon Fishing in the Yemen a "surprisingly lush, endearing little film, in which a swelling sense of romanticism thoroughly banishes even the most far-fetched improbabilities." In his review for The Telegraph, Robbie Collins gave the film three out of five stars, calling it "cinema at its most easily digestible" with a cast that is as "unthreateningly attractive as its sense of humour is cosily inclusive." Collins concluded that Salmon Fishing in the Yemen is a "disarmingly nice hour and three-quarters of gentle romance and even gentler comedy."

The film received some negative reviews. Peter Bradshaw from The Guardian, who gave the film two out of five stars, wrote that it "feels as if you've seen it many times before". According to Bradshaw, the weakest scenes of the film involve the ferocious government PR chief (Kristin Scott Thomas), with "much lip-pursing and eye-rolling, but nothing funny or believable in the script for her to say."

On the review aggregator website Rotten Tomatoes, the film holds a 68% positive rating among critics, based on 148 reviews. The critic consensus states: "Quirky and a little reserved, Salmon Fishing in the Yemen is nonetheless a charming little romantic drama sold by some strong central performances." The film holds a score of 58 on Metacritic, based on 35 reviews.

=== Box office ===
As of June 2012, the film has grossed $34.6 million.

The film opened in 18 cinemas so in the United States on 9 March 2012, taking in $225,000 for the three-day weekend. The film expanded to 483 cinemas by the end of March, when it had grossed over $3 million.

=== Awards and nominations ===
In 2012, the film was nominated for the European Film Awards People's Choice Award.

The film was also nominated for three Golden Globe Awards: Best Motion Picture – Musical or Comedy, Best Actor – Motion Picture Musical or Comedy for McGregor, and Best Actress – Motion Picture Musical or Comedy for Blunt.

== See also ==
- Water supply and sanitation in Yemen
