= Resort (disambiguation) =

A resort is a place used for relaxation or recreation, attracting visitors for holidays or vacations.

Resort may also refer to:

- Resort Air, former name of Trans States Airlines
- Resorts of Suriname, second-level administrative divisions
- Resort Township, Michigan
- Resort wear, a clothing style and a year-round "season" in the fashion industry.

== See also ==
- Last resort (disambiguation)
- Resorte, a Mexican musical group
- The Resort (disambiguation)
