= Something Rotten =

Something Rotten may refer to:

- Something Rotten (Fforde novel), a 2004 novel by Jasper Fforde
- Something Rotten (Gratz novel), a 2007 novel by Alan Gratz
- Something Rotten (Lipstein novel), a 2025 novel by Andrew Lipstein
- Something Rotten!, a 2015 musical by John O'Farrell, Karey Kirkpatrick and Wayne Kirkpatrick

== See also ==
- Something Rotten in Kislev, a 1988 role-playing game supplement
