= Last Resort =

Last Resort or The Last Resort may refer to:

== Arts, entertainment, and media ==
=== Films ===
- Last Resort (1986 film), starring Charles Grodin—a comedy set on a tropical island
- Last Resort (2000 film), a film directed by Pawel Pawlikowski—a young Russian woman abandoned in a British seaside town
- National Lampoon's Last Resort, a 1994 direct-to-video comedy set on a Caribbean island
- The Last Resort (2018 film), a documentary about Miami Beach

=== Gaming ===
- Last Resort (video game), a 1992 video game for the Neo-Geo system
- The Last Resort (adventure), for the role-playing game Marvel Super Heroes
- The Last Resort (Mario), setting of Luigi's Mansion 3
- 9: The Last Resort, a 1996 adventure computer game

=== Literature ===
- The Last Resort (Rogers book), travel book about Zimbabwe by Douglas Rogers
- The Last Resort (novel), a 2003 novel based on the Doctor Who series
- Last Resort (Lipstein novel), a 2022 novel by Andrew Lipstein
- The Last Resort (Nancy Drew/Hardy Boys), a 1990 novel for children and teenagers

=== Music ===
- The Last Resort, Oi! band
- The Last Resort (album), a 2006 album by the Danish electronic musician Trentemøller
- The Last Resort (EP), a 2022 EP by Midland
- "Last Resort" (song), a song by Papa Roach from their 2000 album Infest
- "Last Resort", a 2019 song by Ayase
- "Last Resort", a song by Katatonia on the 1998 album Discouraged Ones
- "The Last Resort" (Eagles song), a song by the Eagles from the 1976 album Hotel California
- "The Last Resort" (T. Graham Brown song), 1988

=== Television ===
==== Series ====
- Last Resort (TV series), a 2012–13 American drama television series created by Shawn Ryan and Karl Gajdusek
- The Last Resort (1988 TV series), a 1988–89 Australian drama television series
- The Last Resort (2017 TV series), a 2017 Australian reality television series
- The Last Resort (American TV series), a 1979–80 American sitcom
- The Last Resort with Jonathan Ross, 1987–90 British talk show

==== Episodes ====
- "Last Resort" (House), a 2008 episode of the fifth season of House
- "Last Resort" (Mercy Point), a 1998 episode of Mercy Point
- "Last Resort", a 1993 episode of the first season of Sailor Moon
- "The Last Resort", a 1993 episode of Adventures of Sonic the Hedgehog
- "The Last Resort", a 1999 episode of Sonic Underground
- "The Last Resort", a 2003 episode of the ninth episode of Sonic X
- "The Last Resort" (Lego Ninjago: Masters of Spinjitzu), a 2016 episode of Lego Ninjago: Masters of Spinjitzu

=== Other arts, entertainment, and media ===
- The Last Resort (comics), a limited-series by Justin Gray, Jimmy Palmiotti and Giancarlo Caracuzzo

== Other uses ==
- LastResort, a font created by Apple, Inc., used to display Unicode text

== See also ==
- Drug of last resort, a medicine used only when all other options are exhausted
- Employer of last resort, who hire workers without other options
- Gateway of last resort, another name for the default route in computer networks
- Last resort rule, part of the decision-making process in U.S. federal courts
- Lender of last resort, an institution such as a central bank willing to extend credit when no one else will
- Letters of last resort, hand-written by the Prime Minister of the United Kingdom
- Operator of last resort, a type of government-backed or owned company in the United Kingdom that operates a railway franchise in the event that a train operating company is no longer able to do so
