= Sanam Mahloudji =

Iranian-American writer

- Born: Tehran
- Education: Yale University, UCLA School of Law
- Occupations: Author, novelist, short story writer, writer, lawyer, jurist
- Notable work: The Persians
- Awards: Pushcart Prize; Women's Prize for Fiction (shortlisted, 2025); Bollinger Everyman Wodehouse Prize (shortlisted, 2025)
- Website: sanammahloudji.com

Sanam Mahloudji is an Iranian-American writer. Her debut novel, The Persians, was shortlisted for the 2025 Women's Prize for Fiction.

== Early life ==
Mahloudji was born in Tehran, Iran and grew up in Los Angeles, California, her family having moved to the United States after the Iranian Revolution. Prior to her career as a writer, Mahloudji worked as a lawyer. She began writing short stories after her father's death in 2010.

== Career ==
She received the Pushcart Prize for her story "Slut Days" and was also nominated for the Robert J. Dau Short Story Prize for Emerging Writers.

Mahloudji's work has been published in the Idaho Review, the Kenyon Review, and McSweeney's Quarterly. Her short story "Auntie Shirin" was published in McSweeney's in 2018. It later became the basis for her debut novel, The Persians.

The Persians was published in 2024 by Fourth Estate, after a five-way auction for the rights. The novel spans seventy years of Iranian history, telling the story of five women across three generations, and was positively received by critics. It was shortlisted for the 2025 Women's Prize for Fiction and the 2025 Bollinger Everyman Wodehouse Prize.

== Personal life ==
Mahloudji and her husband moved to London in 2017, where they currently reside. They have two children.
