= Jia Tolentino =

Canadian-American writer and editor (born 1988)

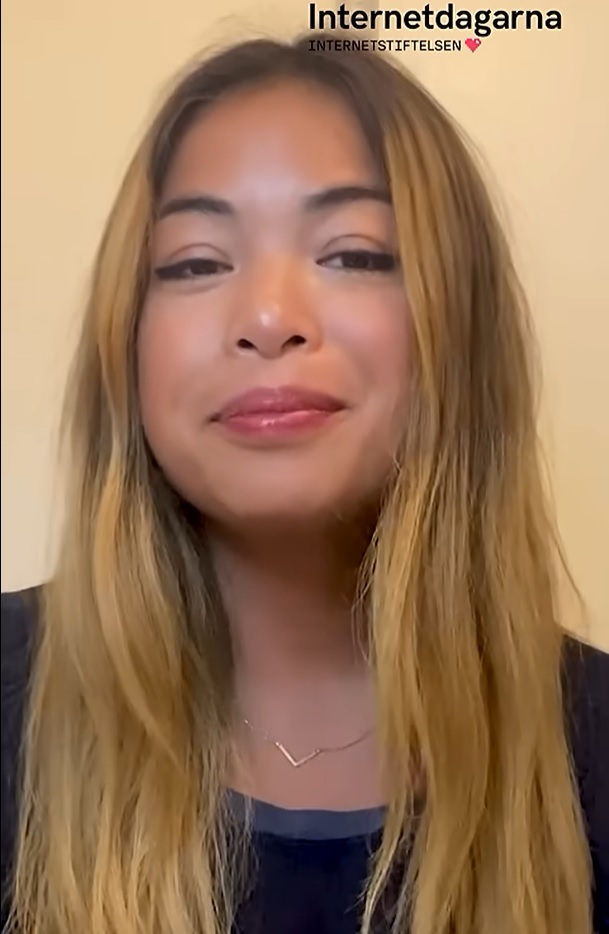
- Jia Tolentino in 2024
- Born: 1988 (age 37–38); Toronto, Ontario, Canada
- Education: University of Virginia (BA); University of Michigan (MFA)
- Occupations: Writer, editor
- Years active: 2013–present
- Employer: The New Yorker
- Awards: Whiting Award (2020)
- Website: jia.blog

Jia Angeli Carla Tolentino (born 1988) is a Canadian-American writer and editor. A staff writer for The New Yorker, she previously worked as deputy editor of Jezebel and a contributing editor at The Hairpin. Her writing has also appeared in The New York Times Magazine and Pitchfork. In 2019, her collected essays were published as Trick Mirror: Reflections on Self-Delusion.

== Early life and education ==
Tolentino was born in Toronto, Ontario, to parents from the Philippines. When she was four, her family moved to Houston, Texas, where she grew up in a Southern Baptist community. Tolentino attended Second Baptist Church Houston, an evangelical megachurch and its private school, Second Baptist School. Tolentino started elementary school early and graduated from high school as her class salutatorian.

At the age of 15, she participated in the game show Girls v. Boys in Puerto Rico.

In 2005, Tolentino enrolled at the University of Virginia as a Jefferson Scholar, studying English, joining the Pi Beta Phi sorority, and participating in an a cappella group called The Virginia Belles. After graduating from UVA in 2009, Tolentino spent a year as a Peace Corps volunteer in Kyrgyzstan. Tolentino earned an MFA from the University of Michigan.

== Career ==
Tolentino began writing for The Hairpin in 2013, hired by then-editor-in-chief Emma Carmichael. In 2014, Tolentino and Carmichael both moved to Jezebel, where Tolentino worked for two years before joining The New Yorker.

Tolentino's writing has won accolades across genres. Flavorwire called her a "go-to music source" and her first short story won the fall 2012 Raymond Carver Short Fiction Contest and was nominated for a Pushcart Prize. She has also garnered favorable attention for essays on topics such as race in publishing, marriage, abortion, and notions of female empowerment, as well as for her music criticism. The A.V. Club admired "Tolentino's sick burns on Charlie Puth" and Studio 360 observed that even in the near-universal panning of Magic!'s song "Rude", "no criticism has been quite as cutting as Jia Tolentino's." Tolentino has reported extensively on the Me Too movement.

In 2017, Tolentino was named in the Forbes 30 Under 30 list in the media category.

On August 6, 2019, Tolentino published Trick Mirror: Reflections on Self-Delusion, a collection of essays. It debuted on The New York Times Best Seller List on August 25, coming in at #2 on the Combined Print & E-Book Non-fiction list. In a review for The New York Times, Maggie Doherty wrote: "Tolentino's earnest ambivalence, expressed often throughout the book, is characteristic of millennial life-writing, and it can be contrasted with boomer self-satisfaction and Gen X disaffection in the same genre." Slate columnist Laura Miller wrote in her review of the book, "Tolentino is a classical essayist along the lines of Montaigne, threading her way on the page toward an understanding of what she thinks and feels about life, the world, and herself." Lauren Oyler's review of Trick Mirror in the London Review of Books criticized it as overly dependent on using Tolentino's personal experiences to substantiate her ideas, and challenged her political analysis as a "shoddy mode of thinking".

In 2020, Tolentino received the Whiting Award for Nonfiction and the Jeannette Haien Ballard Prize.

Tolentino's 2021 reporting on the conservatorship of Britney Spears, co-authored with Ronan Farrow, attracted international attention, and was described as "blistering" by Tyler Aquilina in Entertainment Weekly and as a "journalistic reference text on Britney Spears" by Dirk Peitz in Die Zeit.

In January 2023, Tolentino made a cameo in the HBO Max show Gossip Girl.

In a 2026 New York Times Opinion podcast, Tolentino and influencer Hasan Piker spoke favorably about stealing from large corporations. Tolentino admitted to shoplifting lemons from Whole Foods Market on several occasions. These remarks drew condemnation from various sources, including cultural critic Thomas Chatterton Williams and law professor Jonathan Turley.

== Personal life ==
Tolentino met her husband, Andrew Daley, an architect, while they were students at the University of Virginia. In the essay "I Thee Dread" in her book Trick Mirror, Tolentino writes at length about her ambivalence toward marriage. Together, they have two children.
