= Ferdia Lennon =

Irish author (born 1988)

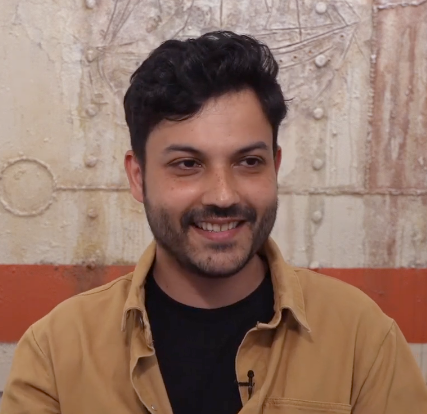
- In a 2024 interview
- Born: 1988 (age 37–38); Tallaght, County Dublin, Ireland
- Education: University College Dublin; University of East Anglia
- Occupation: Writer

Ferdia Lennon (born 1988) is an Irish author. His debut novel, Glorious Exploits, was a bestseller that won numerous awards and was adapted for BBC Radio 4.

== Biography ==
Lennon was born to an Irish mother and a Libyan father and grew up in Tallaght, County Dublin.

Lennon graduated with a Bachelor of Arts (BA) in history and classics from University College Dublin and a Master of Arts (MA) in prose fiction from the University of East Anglia. He lives in Norwich with his wife and son.

== Career ==
His debut novel, Glorious Exploits was a Sunday Times bestseller. It has been adapted for BBC Radio 4 and was the winner of the Waterstones Debut Fiction Prize 2024, the Authors' Club Best First Novel Award, the Premio Gregor von Rezzori and the Bollinger Everyman Wodehouse Prize for Comic Fiction. It was also shortlisted for several other awards, including the Nero Debut Fiction Award, formerly known as the Costa Awards. the 2025 Swansea University Dylan Thomas Prize. and the Walter Scott Prize for Historical Fiction.

== Awards and honours ==
=== Literary awards ===
Year	Work	Award	Category	Result	Ref
2024	Glorious Exploits	Bollinger Everyman Wodehouse Prize for Comic Fiction	—	Won	
2024	Glorious Exploits	Waterstones Debut Fiction Prize	—	Won	
2024	Glorious Exploits	Waterstones Book of the Year	—	Shortlisted	
2024	Glorious Exploits	Nero Debut Fiction Award	—	Shortlisted	
2024	Glorious Exploits	Carnegie Medal for Excellence in Fiction	—	Longlisted	
2024	Glorious Exploits	Books Are My Bag Readers' Awards	Fiction	Shortlisted	
2025	Glorious Exploits	Dylan Thomas Prize	—	Shortlisted	
2025	Glorious Exploits	British Book Awards	—	Shortlisted	
2025	Glorious Exploits	Runciman Award	—	Shortlisted	
2025	Glorious Exploits	Authors’ Club First Novel Award	—	Won	
2025	Glorious Exploits	Premio Gregor von Rezzori	—	Won	
2025	Glorious Exploits	Walter Scott Prize	—	Shortlisted	
2025	Glorious Exploits	Rooney Prize for Irish Literature	—	Won	
