= The Vegan =

2023 novel by Andrew Lipstein

- Author: Andrew Lipstein
- Publisher: Farrar, Straus and Giroux
- Publication date: July 11, 2023
- ISBN: 9780374606589

The Vegan is a novel by Andrew Lipstein. It was published by Farrar, Straus and Giroux in 2023.

== Plot summary ==
Young hedge fund manager Herschel Caine is attempting to find investors for his firm so that he can compete financially with his neighbors. After accidentally causing one of his friends to fall into a coma when a prank goes wrong, he is overcome by ecological empathy which pushes him towards extreme veganism.

== Reception ==
The book received mostly positive reviews from critics for its exploration of moral quandaries and Herscel's awakening to the ethics of human interactions with the natural world. However, some reviewers criticized its themes and portrayal of veganism for being shallow. Alexandra Jacobs of The New York Times described it as "a pig in a blanket of irony, subversion and humor." Tahdg Hoey of the Los Angeles Book Review wrote that "The Vegan has the makings of an ambitiously conceived, 10-course tasting menu, but by the end of it, it left me feeling hungry and confused."
