= Guy Kennaway =

English writer

Guy Kennaway is an English writer renowned for his memoirs and comic novels. He specializes in crafting stories that often blend humor with sharp social commentary. He is represented by Mark Stanton at the North Literary Agency. His distinct voice and perspective have made him a notable figure in contemporary English literature. In 2021 he won the Bollinger Everyman Wodehouse Prize for his comic fiction The Accidental Collector.

== Career and writing style ==
Kennaway's literary career is characterized by a focus on comic novels and memoirs, where he frequently explores the absurdities and complexities of human life. His works often draw on his personal experiences, and he has a knack for finding humor in the darker aspects of life.

He also contributes as a feature writer for the Financial Times, where he covers various topics.

== Bibliography ==
- One People, 1999 (Canongate Books)
- Sunbathing Naked, 2008 (Canongate Books)
- Bird Brain, 2011 (Jonathan Cape)
- Time To Go, 2019 (Mensch Publishing]
- The Accidental Collector, 2021 (Mensch Publishing)
- Foot Notes 2021 (Mensch Publishing)
- One People, 2022 (Eland Books)
- Good Scammer, 2023 (Mensch Publishing)

== Early and personal life ==
Guy Charles Kennaway was born on May 8, 1957, in London, UK. He grew up in a literary family, with his father, James Kennaway, being a well-known novelist and screenwriter, and his mother, Susan Kennaway, also a writer. Guy is one of four siblings: his sister Jane Kennaway is a musician, Emma Kennaway is an artist, and David Kennaway is a film producer.

Guy splits his time between London, UK, and Hanover, Jamaica. His connection to Jamaica is reflected in several of his works, which often draw on his experiences and observations from the country.

He has two children, Ella and James.

== Publications ==
- Why I Write Bookanista
- The Very Thing Keeping Tourist Safe In Jamaica? Crime. Spectator UK
- A Jamaican Life Eland Books

== Awards ==
2021 - Bollinger Everyman Wodehouse Prize
