= A Little Trickerie =

2024 historical novel by Rosanna Pike

- Author: Rosanna Pike
- Language: English
- Genre: Historical fiction
- Set in: Early Tudor England
- Publisher: Fig Tree
- Publication date: 1 August 2024
- Publication place: United Kingdom

A Little Trickerie is a 2024 historical fiction novel and the debut novel of Rosanna Pike. Set in the early Tudor period, the novel is based on the true story of the Holy Maid of Leominster. A Little Trickerie became a Sunday Times bestseller and won the Bollinger Everyman Wodehouse Prize among other accolades.

== Background ==
Pike gained inspiration for the novel when she stumbled upon the "extremely brief" Wikipedia page for the Holy Maid of Leominster. Known as Elizabeth, the Holy Maid appeared to the priory in Leominster as an angel and developed a cult following before being exposed as a fraud. This took place in the late 15th or early 16th century. In 2023, Fig Tree (a Penguin Books imprint) acquired the rights to publish Pike's debut novel A Little Trickerie in 2024.

== Synopsis ==
Born and raised in vagrancy during the reign of Henry VII, 14-year-old Tibb Ingleby is orphaned and alone following the death of her mother. The novel follows her travels through the English countryside. This culminates in the Holy Maid scheme, which Tibb aims to utilise to make money.

== Reception ==
A Little Trickerie debuted on The Sunday Times bestseller list. Imogen Hermes Gowar of The Guardian compared the novel to Rose Tremain's Restoration (1989).

=== Accolades ===
Year	Award	Category	Result	Ref.
2025	Women's Prize for Fiction		Longlisted	
2025	Goldsboro Books Glass Bell Award		Won	
2025	Bollinger Everyman Wodehouse Prize		Won	
