= The Resort =

The Resort may refer to:

- The Resort (TV series), a mystery comedy series premiered in 2022
- The Resort (film), a 2021 horror film by Taylor Chien

== See also ==
- Resort (disambiguation)
