= Jacqueline Crooks =

Jamaican-born British writer

Jacqueline Crooks FRSL
- Born: Jamaica
- Education: University of Roehampton; Goldsmiths, University of London (MA)
- Occupation: Writer
- Notable work: The Ice Migration (2019); Fire Rush (2024)
- Awards: Paul Torday Memorial Prize

Jacqueline Crooks is a British writer whose debut novel, Fire Rush, was shortlisted for the 2023 Women's Prize for Fiction. She was described as one of the "10 best new novelists for 2023" by The Observer.

== Early life ==
Crooks was born in Jamaica and raised in Southall, west London. She graduated from the University of Roehampton with a degree in Social Policy and from Goldsmiths, University of London, with a Master of Arts (MA) in Creative and Life Writing.

== Writing career ==
Crooks wrote a short-story collection titled The Ice Migration, which was longlisted for the 2019 Orwell Prize for Political Fiction. One of her short stories was shortlisted for the BBC National Short Story Award in 2019.

Her debut novel, Fire Rush, took 16 years to write and is based on her diary entries.

Crooks was elected a Fellow of the Royal Society of Literature (FRSL) in 2024.

== Awards ==
Year	Title	Award	Category	Result	Ref.
2019	"Silver Fish in the Midnight Sea"	BBC National Short Story Award	—	Shortlisted	
2019	The Ice Migration	Orwell Prize	Political Fiction	Longlisted	
2023	Fire Rush	Waterstones Debut Fiction Prize	—	Shortlisted	
2023	Fire Rush	Women's Prize for Fiction	—	Shortlisted	
2024	Fire Rush	Authors' Club Best First Novel Award	—	Shortlisted	
2024	Fire Rush	Diverse Book Awards	Adult	Longlisted	
2024	Fire Rush	Jhalak Prize	—	Shortlisted	
2024	Fire Rush	Paul Torday Memorial Prize	—	Won	
2024	Fire Rush	McKitterick Prize	—	Shortlisted	

== Bibliography ==
- The Ice Migration. Peepal Tree Press. 2018. ISBN 9781845233587.
- Fire Rush. Penguin. 2023. ISBN 9780593300534.
