= The Satsuma Complex =

2022 romantic mystery novel by Bob Mortimer

- First edition paperback cover of The Satsuma Complex by Bob Mortimer
- Author: Bob Mortimer
- Language: English
- Genre: Romantic comedy, Mystery fiction
- Publisher: Simon & Schuster (UK) Gallery/Scout Press (US)
- Publication date: October 27, 2022 (UK) September 5, 2023 (US)
- Publication place: United Kingdom
- Pages: 304
- Award: Bollinger Everyman Wodehouse Prize
- ISBN: 978-1-398-52364-7
- Followed by: The Hotel Avocado

The Satsuma Complex, published in the U.S. under the title The Clementine Complex, is a 2022 novel by British comedian Bob Mortimer. Writing his autobiography And Away... in 2020 inspired him to write fiction. He aimed to emulate the writing style of Japanese author Haruki Murakami. The Satsuma Complex won the Bollinger Everyman Wodehouse Prize for comic fiction in 2023. In celebration of the prize, Oakland Farms in East Sussex had a pig named after the novel. It is followed by the novel The Hotel Avocado.

== Plot ==
Gary Thorn, an unremarkable legal assistant, meets with a colleague, Brendan, in a bar. While there, he spots a woman sitting by herself reading a book called The Satsuma Complex. After Brendan leaves, Gary makes conversation with her but does not get her name. The following day, he is told that Brendan has been found dead and that he was the last person to see him. Motivated both by curiosity and a need to establish an alibi, Gary sets out to find the unknown woman (whom he dubs "Satsuma") and to figure out what happened to Brendan that night.
