= Holy Maid of Leominster =

15th-century fraudster

The Holy Maid of Leominster, known only as Elizabeth, was installed in the rood loft above the chancel of the priory of Leominster by its prior in the late 15th or early 16th century. The prior claimed that she had been sent by God, and that she could survive without either food or drink except for "Aungels foode" (communion bread). Elizabeth had no need to descend to the chapel for her sustenance, as during Mass the bread was seen to fly up out of the prior's hands and into her mouth.

Margaret Beaufort, the mother of King Henry VII, had convened a council whose task was to investigate cases like those of the Holy Maid, who had developed a cult following, and attracted visitors seeking cures and blessings. Upon investigating Elizabeth's living quarters they discovered excrement that had "no saintly savour", meat bones hidden under her bed, and perhaps most damning of all, a thin wire extending from the altar to her loft. Margaret ordered that Elizabeth was to be removed from the chapel, following which the latter confessed that she was in reality the prior's mistress. The pair were punished by being ordered to perform a public penance.

== In media ==
Rosanna Pike based her debut novel A Little Trickerie (2024) on the Holy Maid of Leominster.
