= McCartney (disambiguation) =

Paul McCartney (born 1942) is an English singer-songwriter, multi-instrumentalist, and composer.

McCartney may also refer to:

== People ==
- McCartney (surname), also Macartney
- McCartney Kessler, professional tennis player

== Other ==
- McCartney (album), a 1970 album by Paul McCartney
- McCartney (planet), a minor planet
- McCartney, Wisconsin, United States

== See also ==
- McCartney Library, an academic library of Geneva College
- McCartney Productions, a holding company for the business interests of Paul McCartney
