= Fake Accounts =

2021 novel by Lauren Oyler

- First edition cover
- Author: Lauren Oyler
- Language: English
- Publisher: Catapult
- Publication date: February 2, 2021
- Publication place: United States
- Pages: 272
- ISBN: 9781948226929

Fake Accounts is the 2021 debut novel by American author and critic Lauren Oyler. It was published on February 2, 2021, by Catapult, and on February 4, 2021, by Fourth Estate.

The novel follows a young woman who discovers that her boyfriend is behind a popular Instagram account which promotes conspiracy theories. It was shortlisted for the 2021 Bollinger Everyman Wodehouse Prize for Comic Fiction.

== Plot ==
In late 2016 the narrator, a blogger, has feelings of ambivalence towards her boyfriend, Felix. She decides to go through his phone where she discovers a secret Instagram account where he espouses conspiracy theories, theories which he does not appear to believe in real life. She decides to break up with him.

The narrator recounts how she met Felix while on a pub crawl in Berlin and the two began a long-distance relationship with Felix eventually joining her in Brooklyn.

Feeling excited about the prospect of ending her relationship with Felix, she nevertheless decides to delay breaking up with him until after the 2017 Women's March, which she attends reluctantly. Felix does not text her during the March which angers her. She later receives a call from his mother that reveals Felix was killed while biking.

The narrator decides to quit her job and move to Berlin on a whim. Knowing no German (and with no plans to learn) she survives in the English language ex-pat community, taking an under-the-table job babysitting children. Bored, she also begins to aggressively date, making connections through online dating apps and coming up with different personas to try out on the men she is dating.

The narrator eventually receives a call from a former friend that reveals that several hours earlier Felix reappeared at a work event with his former colleagues, revealing he faked his death as a piece of performance art and is now living in Berlin. The narrator sends Felix an angry email to which he responds that he assumed she knew he faked his own death.

A short while later the narrator runs into Felix on the streets of Berlin. She mentions that in his new Instagram page he quoted something she once tweeted. He tells her that was the point.

== Form and style ==
A section in the middle of the book is written in a fragmented narrative style popular in contemporary fiction, which the narrator scorns—she asks, "Why, would I want to make my book like Twitter?" Critics were divided on the merit of this parody—some found it effective and comedic, while others disagreed.

The narrator of Fake Accounts bears obvious resemblances to Oyler, leading several critics to remark on the difficulty of establishing the extent to which the narrator is based on, or parodies, the author. Some critics argued that this was a way for Oyler to push her readers to reflect on the ways they regularly package themselves for consumption—from dating apps to social media, we all engage in reinventions of ourselves.

Fake Accounts employs other metafictional devices: the narrator addresses the reader and an imagined audience of her ex-boyfriends, and the novel is divided into four sections, titled Beginning, Middle (Something Happens), Middle (Nothing Happens), and Climax.

== Writing and development ==
Oyler enjoyed the freedom involved in writing a novel. In the past, she had mostly written for articles for magazines, which involved more constraints and editorial intervention. She has a reputation for unflinching critiques of novels and books, and she has said she has prepared for a negative review, or negative reviews, of Fake Accounts. Several interviewers asked her about the possibility around the time the novel was released.

Oyler wrote the novel in part due to a desire to comment on the internet and social interactions on the internet.

== Television series ==
In February 2022, it was reported that the novel will be adapting into a television series. The project will be produced by Anonymous Content's AC Studios with Ben Sinclair, Jen Silverman, Julia Garner, Rowan Riley and Oyler as executive producers.

== Critical reception ==
Reviewers frequently described it as funny. In a review in the New York Times, Katie Kitamura called it "invigorating" and "deadly precise". Kevin Power, writing in the Guardian, said it was "prismatically intelligent".

Kirkus Reviews said it was, "Not bad as social commentary. Not that great as a story." The New Statesman called it "laboured and pretentious," and boring – "an experiment in sustained snark."

Parul Sehgal of the New York Times said that Fake Accounts is a novel in which social media "feels, finally, fully and thoroughly explored, with style and originality." She considered it a worthwhile read, although she warned that it is "maddening at times, too cautious, regrettably intent on replicating the very voice it critiques."

The London Review of Books criticised the novel's tendency towards "aimless" and "half-finished" digressions, but complimented the writing as occasionally "precise, even dazzling."

Several reviewers lamented the lack of sincerity and emotional vulnerability in the novel, with Wired calling it "bloodless." HuffPost said of Fake Accounts that "while successful at capturing the misery of life online, it sometimes feels captured by it." A review in the Rumpus admitted that the novel's "discomfort with vulnerability, its commitment to self-awareness and self-degradation, ultimately makes for a draining emotional experience," but suggested that this had been Oyler's intention.

A number of critics noted thematic similarities to Patricia Lockwood's debut novel No One Is Talking About This, which was published in the same month. Both deal with the internet and its intrusion into day-to-day life.
