= Trick Mirror =

2019 essay collection by Jia Tolentino

Trick Mirror: Reflections on Self-Delusion
- Author: Jia Tolentino
- Language: English
- Subjects: Internet culture, feminism
- Publisher: Random House
- Publication date: 6 August 2019
- Media type: Print (hardcover and paperback)
- Pages: 303
- ISBN: 978-0525510543 (First edition hardcover)

Trick Mirror: Reflections on Self-Delusion is a 2019 book by American author Jia Tolentino. It contains nine essays about topics including internet culture, marriage, scams, and contemporary feminism.

== Writing ==
Tolentino began writing the collection in early 2017 and finished it in the fall of 2018. Before she sold the book to Random House, Tolentino chose a question to address in each essay. Tolentino selected the order of the essays so that each builds on the previous one.

== Contents ==
- The I in the Internet
- Reality TV Me
- Always Be Optimizing
- Pure Heroines
- Ecstasy
- The Story of a Generation in Seven Scams
- We Come from Old Virginia
- The Cult of the Difficult Woman
- I Thee Dread

== Reception ==
On August 25, 2019, Trick Mirror debuted at #2 on The New York Times Bestseller list in the category Combined Print & E-Book Non-Fiction. It remained on the list for five weeks.

Kirkus Reviews compared Tolentino to Joan Didion and described the collection as "exhilarating, groundbreaking essays that should establish Tolentino as a key voice of her generation." Writing for Slate, reviewer Laura Miller called Tolentino "a classical essayist along the lines of Montaigne." The Guardian called Trick Mirror "a bold and playful collection of essays from a hugely talented writer." NPR's Vincent Acovino called the collection "phenomenal" and praised Tolentino's "trademark brand of freewheeling wit and intelligence."

One highly critical review, written by Lauren Oyler for the London Review of Books, received much publicity and generated so much online traffic that their website crashed. Among other things, Oyler faults Tolentino for self-centered writing, faulting her for making "any observation about the world lead back to [her] own [life] and feelings, though it should be the other way round" and noting "she primarily uses personal experience to substantiate – rather than ‘get to the bottom of’ – her ideas, though her tendency towards hyperbole has the effect of making them seem entirely subjective."
