= Glorious Exploits =

2024 book by Ferdia Lennon

- Author: Ferdia Lennon
- Language: English
- Genre: Historical fiction
- Publisher: Fig Tree
- Publication date: 18 January 2024
- ISBN: 978-0-241-61764-9

Glorious Exploits is a 2024 historical fiction novel by the Irish writer Ferdia Lennon. His debut novel, it is principally set in Syracuse in 412 BC, after the defeat of the Athenian expedition to Sicily during the Peloponnesian War. It follows Lampo and Gelon, two unemployed potters who recruit Athenian prisoners held in the city's quarries to perform plays by Euripides. Lampo narrates most of the novel in a modern Irish vernacular that combines comic dialogue with depictions of imprisonment and the consequences of war.

Lennon based the premise on Plutarch's account that some Athenian captives survived by reciting Euripides to Sicilians. He spent about seven years writing the novel and researched it through ancient texts and visits to Greece and Sicily. Fig Tree published the first edition in the United Kingdom and Ireland on 18 January 2024; Henry Holt and Company released the American edition on 26 March.

Glorious Exploits received positive reviews from critics, who often praised Lennon's handling of tragicomedy and the narrator's voice. The novel won the 2024 Waterstones Debut Fiction Prize and Bollinger Everyman Wodehouse Prize, and the 2025 Authors' Club Best First Novel Award.

== Background and development ==
Ferdia Lennon studied history and classics at University College Dublin and had intended to write about ancient Greece. The immediate source for the novel was a passage in Plutarch's Life of Nicias, which says that Sicilians' admiration for Euripides led some Athenian captives to be freed and others to receive food and drink for remembered lines of his work. Lennon moved the account from anecdote to premise by imagining two ordinary Syracusans attempting to stage a complete play with prisoners as performers. The project took about seven years to complete.

For his research, Lennon visited Sicily and Greece and read works by Herodotus, Thucydides, Sappho, and the surviving Greek comic and tragic playwrights. He said that he put the research aside before composing the narrative so that historical detail would remain subordinate to Lampo's voice. His literary influences included Herman Melville, John Fante, Seán O'Casey, Hilary Mantel and Mary Renault; he also cited films by Akira Kurosawa, the Coen brothers and Sergio Leone as models for making a familiar period appear unfamiliar.

Lennon chose Hiberno-English for the Syracusan dialogue to disrupt the formal idiom often associated with classical historical fiction. He also regarded ancient Sicily as a colonised, culturally mixed place, and used the language to suggest its contested relationship with mainland Greece. He connected the novel's humour to both the irreverence of ancient Greek comedy and the comedy he had known while growing up in Dublin.

== Plot ==
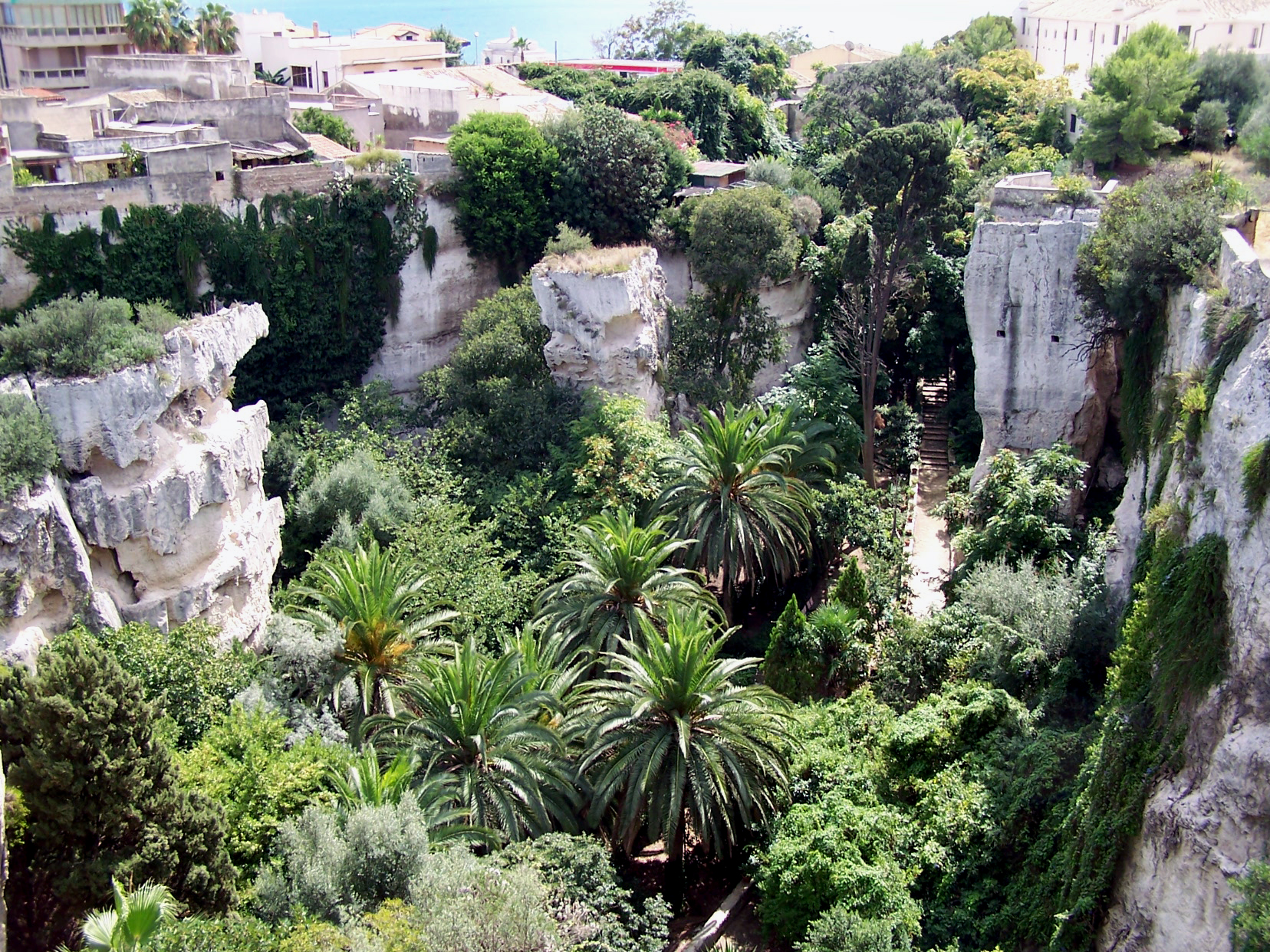
The Latomia dei Cappuccini, one of Syracuse's ancient stone quarries

In 412 BC, Syracuse has repelled an Athenian invasion. Thousands of captured soldiers are confined in limestone quarries, where exposure, disease, hunger and thirst are killing them. Lampo and Gelon, childhood friends left unemployed by the closure of their pottery factory, visit the prisoners carrying food and drink. Gelon, who is mourning his son and the departure of his wife, offers rations to men who can recite Euripides.

Lampo saves Paches, an educated Athenian, from Biton, a Syracusan whose son was killed by the invaders. The friends also find Numa, an actor who has worked in rural theatres. Gelon decides to stage Medea in the quarry, with Numa in the title role and Paches as Jason. They sell armour found by local war orphans to Tuireann, a foreign sea captain and collector who finances the production. Gelon later expands the programme to include The Trojan Women. The prisoners rehearse while shackled and starving; local children assist, Alcar provides music and a theatrical costumer named Alekto supplies the costumes.

Lampo falls in love with Lyra, an enslaved woman at Dismas's tavern. After squandering some of the production money on clothes rather than supplies, he begins working and saving the 300 drachmae that Dismas demands for her freedom. Lyra distrusts his promise but says that she will stay with him if he truly frees her. Meanwhile, Biton confronts the directors for feeding enemy soldiers and warns them to stop the play.

The double bill attracts hundreds of Syracusans. Medea begins uncertainly but wins over the audience; in The Trojan Women, the prisoners' emaciation and chains become part of the spectacle. Gelon casts a young Syracusan, Strabo, as Astyanax, and the staged killing of the child brings captors and captives to tears. During Numa's final lament, Biton kills him and other attackers descend on the cast, killing Alcar and most of the actors and severely beating Gelon. Paches survives by feigning death.

The authorities then decide to end the prisoners' rations and leave them to die. Lampo arranges for Tuireann to receive fugitives at Hyccara and borrows Alekto's wagon. Gelon initially refuses to help but joins Lampo on the night of the escape. They break through the quarry fence, rescue Paches and several other Athenians, and cross Sicily; a patrolman who recognises Gelon from the performance allows them to pass. At Hyccara, the prisoners board Tuireann's ship. Lampo declines an offer to sail with him and instead accepts 300 drachmae to free Lyra. On returning to Syracuse, however, he learns that Dismas has already sold her to Tuireann for 700 drachmae.

Years later, Lampo finishes recounting these events to the adult Strabo, who has written them down for him. Gelon has died after founding a school for children, and Syracuse is under Carthaginian siege. Lampo refuses Strabo's request that he leave the city and casts the unused money into the quarry. In a chronologically earlier epilogue set in Athens in 408 BC, Paches visits Euripides before the playwright's departure for Macedonia. He gives Euripides a scroll by Heraclitus and tells him about the prisoners' performances.

== Style and themes ==
The main narrative is told in the first person by Lampo, whose working-class Dublin rhythms and comic observations mediate scenes of starvation and violence; a brief third-person epilogue follows. Fintan O'Toole wrote in the New York Review of Books that the dialogue moves between vulgarity and serious reflection without becoming a sustained linguistic joke. He interpreted the fusion of Irish speech and Greek history as an off-centre view of Athenian imperial power: Syracuse belongs to Greek culture but also stands outside its dominant centre. A. K. Blakemore similarly identified the vernacular as the book's central formal innovation, and noted the Celtic associations of Tuireann as a further connection between Irish and Greek traditions.

Comedy and tragedy operate together throughout the narrative. Killian Fox of the Observer described Lampo as a comic creation while emphasising that the novel's humour coexists with bereavement and the conditions in the quarry. Talya Zax of the Washington Post wrote that Lampo's storytelling repeatedly turns tragedy into humour and back again. She connected that instability to the novel's interest in performance as a means of enduring grief, but also as a social practice that can conceal cruelty.

== Publication ==
Fig Tree, an imprint of Penguin, published Glorious Exploits in the United Kingdom and Ireland on 18 January 2024. Henry Holt and Company published the United States edition on 26 March 2024.

== Reception ==
Glorious Exploits received generally positive reviews from critics.

Several reviewers concentrated on the novel's balance of comedy and violence. Killian Fox of the Observer called the premise uproarious and the prose controlled, and found that Lampo's encounters with the prisoners gradually draw out a capacity for selflessness without suggesting that stories can repair political violence by themselves. Donna Edwards of the Associated Press praised its quick-witted, dialogue-heavy prose, Irish inflection and combination of dark humour and tragedy; she considered the climactic performance effective even for readers unfamiliar with traditional Greek tragedy. Talya Zax of the Washington Post praised Lampo's voice and Ferdia Lennon's treatment of grief, describing the novel as both entertaining and emotionally severe.

In a longer consideration, Fintan O'Toole in the New York Review of Books praised the book's historical and linguistic construction. He argued that its hopefulness was still credible because Lennon does not remove slavery, constraint or reciprocal wartime cruelty from the story, and concluded that its defence of art arises from scepticism rather than piety.

=== Accolades ===
Accolades for Glorious Exploits
Year	Award	Result	Ref.
2024	Waterstones Debut Fiction Prize	Won	
2024	Bollinger Everyman Wodehouse Prize	Won	
2024	Nero Book Award for Debut Fiction	Shortlisted	
2024	Waterstones Book of the Year	Shortlisted	
2025	Authors' Club Best First Novel Award	Won	
2025	Premio Gregor von Rezzori for Best Work of Foreign Fiction	Won	
2025	Rooney Prize for Irish Literature	Won	
2025	British Book Award for Debut Fiction	Shortlisted	
2025	Dylan Thomas Prize	Shortlisted	
2025	Walter Scott Prize	Shortlisted	
