= Jessica Francis Kane =

American writer

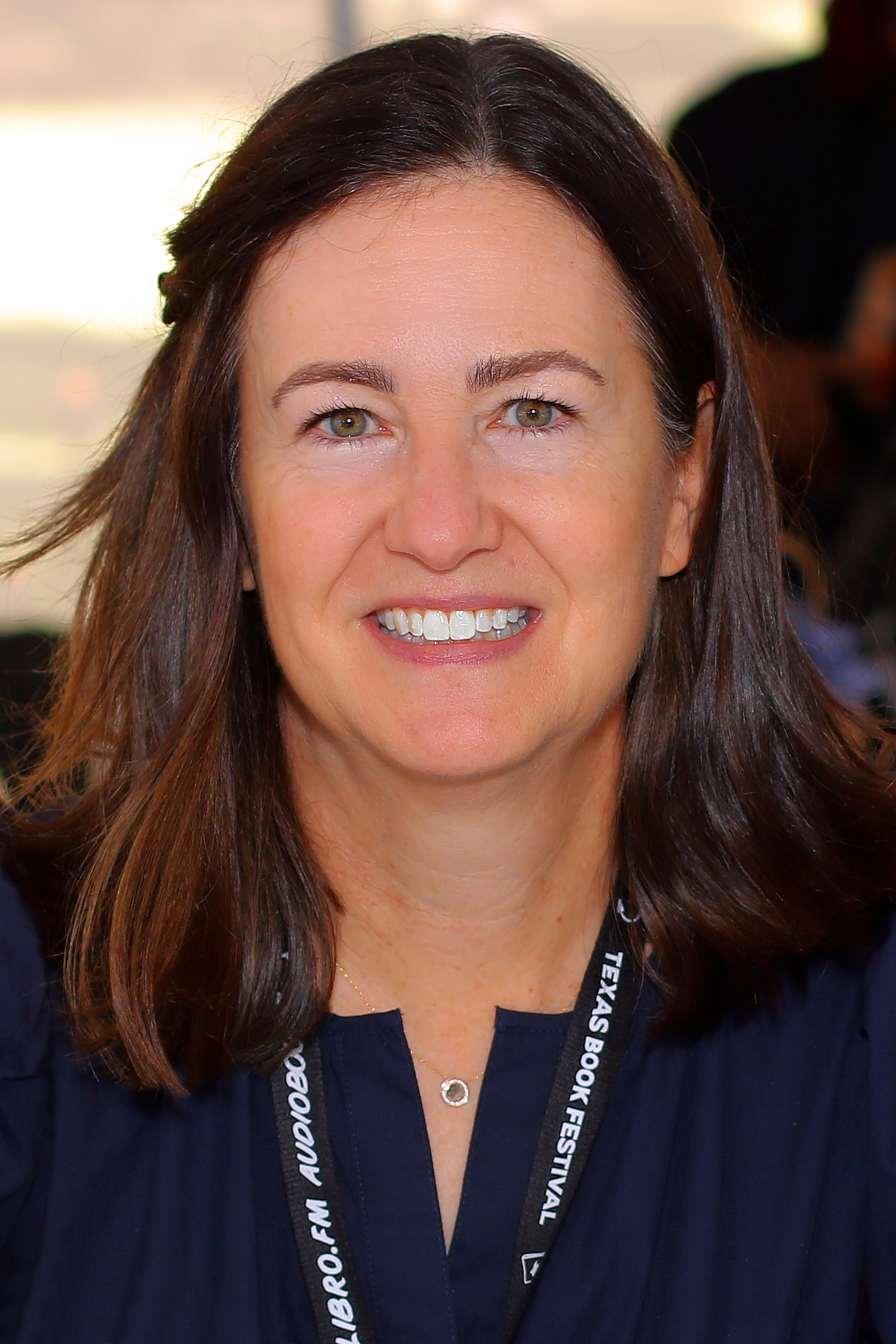
- Kane at the 2025 Texas Book Festival
- Occupation: Writer
- Website: www.jessicafranciskane.com

Jessica Francis Kane (born January 4, 1971) is an American novelist and short story writer. She is the author of three novels and two short story collections. Her work has been translated into six languages.

Her first novel, The Report (Graywolf, 2010), was a finalist for the Center for Fiction First Novel Prize.

Kane's second novel, Rules for Visiting (Penguin Press, 2019), was an Indie Next List pick and became a national bestseller. It was shortlisted for the Bollinger Everyman Wodehouse Prize, long listed for the Joyce Carol Oates Prize, and named in Oprah Daily as one of the best books of 2019.

Her story collection, This Close (Graywolf, 2013), was long listed for The Story Prize and a named a best book of the year by NPR.

Fonseca (Penguin Press, 2025) is her latest novel. The New York Times named it one of the 10 Best Historical Fiction Books of 2025 and it has been shortlisted for the 2026 Le Prix du Meilleur livre étranger.

Kane's stories, articles, and essays have appeared in Harper’s Magazine, The New York Times, Slate, A Public Space, Virginia Quarterly Review, McSweeney's, ZYZZYVA, and Granta.

She has been a fellow at The MacDowell Colony and the Virginia Center for the Creative Arts.
