= Charlie Savage (novel) =

Novel by Roddy Doyle

- First edition
- Author: Roddy Doyle
- Cover artist: Laurie Avon
- Language: English
- Publisher: Jonathan Cape
- Publication date: 7 March 2019
- Publication place: Ireland
- Media type: Print
- Pages: 208 pp
- ISBN: 9781787331181 (hardcover 1st ed.)

Charlie Savage is a 2019 novel by Irish writer Roddy Doyle, shortlisted for the Bollinger Everyman Wodehouse Prize. The novel consisted of a year of appearances in the weekend magazine appearing in the Irish Independent.

== Plot ==
Charlie Savage is a 60-year-old grandfather living in Dublin; he dotes on his grandchildren and dogs, has an indefatigable wife playing drums in a sexagenarian punk covers band, and his drinking mate identifies as a woman. Though the short 52 chapters mark a week in his life over a year, the same characters and themes repeat. For example, his chest now has a tattoo of SpongeBob to stop his three-year-old grandson from wanting one; his best mate Martin has now fallen in love with Charlie's first girlfriend Eleanor Pidgeon; and Charlie's love of watching football on Match of the Day.

== Release ==
The novel was originally published in hardcover on 7 March 2019 in the United Kingdom through Jonathan Cape, along with audiobook and kindle versions through Vintage Digital. A paperback edition was released slightly over a year later under Vintage Books, on 12 March 2020. The cover was largely the same, except with a lighter background color.

A translation, in Italian, entitled Un anno alla grande (A Great Year), was released by Guanda.

== Reception ==
Niamh Donnelly in The Irish Times says that Charlie "is someone who’s aware of how ridiculous the world can be, but who nonetheless participates in the whole joke...There’s a knack to this character-sketch style writing. It depends on 'on the money' observations and on-point humour. Writing like this is like performing stand-up: make 'em laugh and you can get away with anything...Doyle knows how to work a crowd. His north-Dublinese is fluent; never mocking, never overstated...It's a difficult balance and at times depth is lost in its pursuit. But it's style that bolsters the piece. More than comedy or insight, this work has tenderness."

Jane Bradley in The Scotsman writes that "this book is seriously outdated – I had previously believed that this 'I'm getting old and the modern world is passing me by' schtick went out with Victor Meldrew in the 1990s. It is, of course, all made up, yet reading it made me wonder: is this just Doyle mocking men of his own generation? Or are these the kinds of opinions he would like to express himself, but doesn't dare to under his own name? Either way, it is a lighthearted, easy read which will undoubtedly appeal to men of Doyle's – and Savage's – generation."

Alastair Mabbott from The Herald concludes that "A refreshingly positive take on middle age, it’s optimistic, warm-hearted, blokishly moving and written with master's pin-sharp command of humour. These tales must have been a welcome weekly balm to the Irish Independent's readers for the past two years, and it's a pleasure to have them in a book that's sure to be picked up and revisited time and time again."
