= Didn't Nobody Give a Shit What Happened to Carlotta =

2022 novel by James Hannaham

- Author: James Hannaham
- Audio read by: Flame Monroe
- Language: English
- Genre: stream of consciousness; gay novel
- Set in: Brooklyn, 2015
- Publisher: Little, Brown and Company (US), Europa Editions (UK)
- Publication date: 30 August 2022 (US)
- Publication place: United States
- Media type: Print (hardback and softback), e-book, audio
- Pages: 300
- ISBN: 978-1-78770-421-3

Didn't Nobody Give a Shit What Happened to Carlotta is a 2022 novel by American writer James Hannaham. Set over the course of the Fourth of July weekend, it follows the titular character, an Afro-Colombian trans woman who returns to Brooklyn, New York after spending twenty years incarcerated in a men's prison.

== Plot ==
In 1993, 22-year-old Carlotta Mercedes accidentally becomes involved in the robbery of a liquor store by her cousin while travelling to a party, during which a woman is shot and permanently disabled. She is subsequently sentenced to 12 to 22 years in prison and spends the next two decades as an inmate at a men's prison in Ithaca, New York. While in prison, Carlotta comes out as a trans woman; however, prison authorities refuse to acknowledge her gender transition, and she is raped by inmates and prison guards alike throughout her time in prison. As a result of her treatment, Carlotta spends six years in isolation, and goes on to form a romantic relationship with another inmate, Frenzy.

Following her fifth meeting with the parole board, Carlotta is surprisingly released from prison a year and a half early, and travels back to New York City to live with her family just before the Independence Day holiday. Carlotta is excited to reconcile with her estranged son Ibe, who she hasn't heard from since he was nine, but is shocked at the gentrification that has happened in Brooklyn since her imprisonment. She returns home to her Afro-Colombian family, many of whom struggle to accept her new gender identity. Carlotta learns that her mother is significantly afflicted with dementia. Carlotta meets with her probation officer who informs her as part of her release she is not allowed to be near alcohol, a matter that is complicated by her family hosting an extravagant wake for a recently deceased family friend. During the course of the weekend, Carlotta tries to avoid contact with alcohol while looking for work and reconciling with old friends, including Doodle, whose party she was travelling to the night she was arrested. Carlotta finds employment as a driver and tries to find someone to teach her how to drive before she starts her new job. During the course of the day, Carlotta struggles to fight her impulses triggered by her traumatic experiences, and jeopardizes her freedom several times, including by shoplifting a designer label shoe, crashing a car, and getting into a verbal altercation with Ibe. She also speaks at length with Doodle about her experiences in prison, including sharing being regularly raped by a guard throughout her sentence.

Carlotta's probation officer becomes unhappy at the alcohol consumption happening at Carlotta's family home, and makes her take a drug test, which she indicates has come back positive. Panicked, Carlotta visits Coney Island, where she meets an old friend, consumes substances, and wakes up the next morning, having slept on the beach overnight and been robbed of her money. Having missed her appointment with probation, Carlotta is recalled back to prison after two days.

The book ends with Carlotta on a bus back to Brooklyn, having completed the rest of her sentence.

== Characters ==
- Carlotta Mercedes, a trans woman who is released from prison on parole after twenty years.
- Ibe, Carlotta's estranged son, a devout Christian who goes by "Iceman".
- Doodle, Carlotta's old friend, whose party she was travelling to when she was arrested.
- Frona, Carlotta's grandmother, who accepts her and her transition.
- Lou, Carlotta's probation officer.
- Paloma, Carlotta's mother, who is afflicted with dementia.
- Pam, Paloma's carer.
- Frenzy, Carlotta's lover, who is an inmate at Ithaca.
- Paul, a real estate agent who Carlotta convinces to teach her how to drive.

== Development ==
Didn't Nobody Give a Shit What Happened to Carlotta is Hannaham's third novel. Hannaham has stated that the novel was loosely inspired by Ulysses by James Joyce, in addition to Homer's The Odyssey. He chose to switch between first-person and third-person in order to answer "certain questions I have about narratives and who is allowed to tell them and why...I wanted, as I always want, to even the playing field between the two voices, to demonstrate that they complement each other, and that neither was 'smarter' or 'more observant' than the other; they were just different".

Hannaham described the character of Carlotta as reflecting "modern existence" for people of colour and queer people, who are regularly exploited but who "have to try to get through it". Like Carlotta, many members of Hannaham's family grew up in a brownstone in Fort Greene, Brooklyn that had been purchased in the 1950s prior to the gentrification of the neighbourhood.

== Reception ==
Didn't Nobody Give a Shit What Happened to Carlotta has received positive reviews from critics, particularly for the character of Carlotta and the narrative style, including fluctuations between a third-person narrative and first-person stream of consciousness.

Jonathan Lethem called Didn't Nobody Give a Shit What Happened to Carlotta "spectacularly Brooklyn and devastatingly human". Writing in The Guardian, John Self called the novel "energetic [and] touching", and praised the character of Carlotta as "comic [and] controversial". Writing in the same publication, Lindesay Irvine called the book "an exuberant odyssey", and cited Carlotta's stream-of-consciousness as being "Joycean".

Houman Barekat in the Financial Times praised Hannaham's "fresh voice and humour". In The New York Times, John Irving described Carlotta as "a tragicomic character... cursed with terrible timing" and said Hannaham "writes like a guardian angel." The Kirkus Review called the novel "brash [and] ambitious... carried by an unforgettable narrator". Kalup Linzy called the book "sad" but with "humour that can be healing".

Reviewers also praised Didn't Nobody Give a Shit What Happened to Carlotta for its depiction of the experience of incarcerated and formerly incarcerated individuals. Writing for The LA Times, Paula Woods called the novel "a scathing, heartbreaking takedown of the carceral system". In Southern Review of Books, Rachel León said "[b]y drawing such a vibrant main character readers can’t help but fall in love with, Hannaham asks us to consider others in Carlotta’s situation and challenges us to give a shit about what happens to them". Kirkus Reviews wrote "Carlotta deserves a lot of things society rarely provides to women like her—among them, a role in great fiction".

Didn't Nobody Give a Shit What Happened to Carlotta won the 2023 Hurston/Wright Legacy Award for Fiction.

== Translations ==
- French: Personne en avait rien à foutre de Carlotta. Translated by Cécile Deniard. Paris: Éditions Globe. 6 April 2023. ISBN 9782383611950.
- Polish: Wszyscy mieli w dupie, co stało się z Carlottą. Translated by Maciej Świerkocki. Warsaw: Cyranka. 28 March 2024. ISBN 9788367121453.
