= Last Resort (Lipstein novel) =

2022 novel by Andrew Lipstein

- Author: Andrew Lipstein
- Publisher: Farrar, Straus and Giroux
- Publication date: January 18, 2022
- ISBN: 978-0-3746-0270-3

Last Resort is a literary novel by Andrew Lipstein. It is Lipstein's debut novel. It was published by Farrar, Straus and Giroux in 2022.

== Plot summary ==
Aspiring novelist Caleb Horowitz prepares to publish his debut novel, which was plagiarized from the life story of his friend Avi. Unbeknownst to him, Avi has joined the editorial staff of a publishing company. When Avi sees Caleb's manuscript, he confronts him. The two agree to deal under which Avi is credited as the author and Caleb keeps the money from the book, which leaves Caleb unsatisfied.

== Reception ==
The book received positive reviews from critics. It was shortlisted for the Bollinger Everyman Wodehouse Prize.
