= Andrew McCartney =

Scottish footballer

Personal information
- Full name: Andrew McCartney
- Place of birth: Glasgow, Scotland
- Position: Centre half

Senior career*
Years	Team	Apps	(Gls)
1930–1933	Queen's Park	43	(0)
1933–1934	Partick Thistle	1	(0)
1934	Cowdenbeath	4	(0)
1935	Edinburgh City		

International career
1931–1933	Scotland Amateurs	4	(0)
- * Club domestic league appearances and goals

Andrew McCartney was a Scottish amateur footballer who in the Scottish League for Queen's Park, Cowdenbeath and Partick Thistle as a centre half. He was capped by Scotland at amateur level.
