= The Last Resort (2017 TV series) =

Australian television series

- Genre: Reality television
- Country of origin: Australia
- Original language: English
- No. of seasons: 1
- No. of episodes: 11

Production
- Production company: Nine Network

Original release
- Network: Nine Network
- Release: 9 May – 28 June 2017

The Last Resort is an Australian reality television series that premiered on the Nine Network on 9 May 2017. The series follows five long-term couples participating in a social experiment in an attempt to save their troubled relationships, with a tropical island as the backdrop. The couples have been struck by problems of infidelity, trust, and intimacy. After a month of intensive relationship bootcamp with Australia's leading relationship experts, the couples either call it quits or commit to each other forever.

== Couples ==
Couple	Ages	Relationship	Hometown
Carl & Lucy	37 & 38	Married with three children	Sydney, New South Wales
Dan & Lisa	35 & 37	Dating with separate children	Brisbane, Queensland
Jodie & Stu	34 & 39	Married with two daughters	Gold Coast, Queensland
Josh & Sharday	25 & 27	Separated with one daughter	Gold Coast, Queensland
Keelan & Sarah	24 & 25	Dating for eight years	Canberra, ACT

== Ratings ==
No.	Title	Air date	Timeslot	Overnight ratings		Consolidated ratings		Total viewers	Ref(s)
No.	Title	Air date	Timeslot	Viewers	Rank	Viewers	Rank	Total viewers	Ref(s)
1	Episode 1	9 May 2017	Tuesday 7:30pm	414,000	—N/a	—N/a	—N/a	414,000	
2	Episode 2	10 May 2017	Wednesday 7:30pm	435,000	19	26,000	20	461,000	
3	Episode 3	16 May 2017	Tuesday 7:30pm	383,000	—N/a	—N/a	—N/a	383,000	
4	Episode 4	17 May 2017	Wednesday 7:30pm	371,000	—N/a	—N/a	—N/a	371,000	
5	Episode 5	24 & 25 May 2017	Wednesday 9:00pm (2 cities); Thursday 9:00pm (3 cities)	172,000 (2 cities); 157,000 (3 cities)	—N/a	—N/a	—N/a	172,000 (2 cities); 157,000 (3 cities)	
