= Sophie McCartney =

English comedian and novelist

- Born: Liverpool
- Occupation: Writer

Website
- sophiemccartney.com

Sophie McCartney is an English comedian and novelist who has written and performed about her experiences of motherhood.

Her parody version of the Ed Sheeran song "Shape of You" went viral.

She is a cousin of Paul McCartney.

She was shortlisted for the Bollinger Everyman Wodehouse Prize for her novel Mother Hens.
