= Paul Torday =

British writer (1946–2013)

- Born: 1 August 1946; Croxdale, County Durham, England
- Died: 18 December 2025 (aged 79)
- Education: Royal Grammar School, Newcastle; Pembroke College, Oxford
- Occupations: Businessman, writer
- Notable work: Salmon Fishing in the Yemen (2006)
- Children: Piers Torday
- Awards: Bollinger Everyman Wodehouse Prize (2007); Waverton Good Read Award (2008)

Paul Torday (/ˈtɔːrdeɪ/; 1 August 1946 – 18 December 2013) was a British writer and the author of the comic novel Salmon Fishing in the Yemen. The book was the winner of the 2007 Bollinger Everyman Wodehouse Prize for comic writing and was serialised on BBC Radio 4. It won the Waverton Good Read Award in 2008. It was made into a 2011 feature film of the same name, starring Ewan McGregor and Emily Blunt.

== Life ==
Born in 1946 in Croxdale, County Durham, north-east England, and educated at the Royal Grammar School, Newcastle and Pembroke College, Oxford, Paul Torday turned to fiction writing only later in life, and his first novel was published at the age of 59. Prior to that, he was a successful businessman living in Northumberland. The inspiration for the novel stemmed from Torday's interest in both fly fishing and the Middle East. From these two strands, he weaves a political satire that centres on the world of political spin management.

His second novel, The Irresistible Inheritance of Wilberforce (titled Bordeaux in the United States), is about a man who drinks himself to death.

In 2008, Torday was shortlisted for his debut novel as Newcomer of the Year at the Galaxy British Book Awards.

Torday's third book, The Girl on the Landing, was published in 2009. This novel deals principally with themes of schizophrenia and racism.

His son Piers Torday is a children's writer.

== Bibliography ==
=== Novels ===
Torday's novels include:

- (2006) Salmon Fishing in the Yemen
- (2008) The Irresistible Inheritance of Wilberforce
- (2009) The Girl on the Landing
- (2010) The Hopeless Life of Charlie Summers
- (2011) More Than You Can Say
- (2011) Breakfast at Hotel Déjà vu
- (2012) Theo
- (2012) The Legacy of Hartlepool Hall
- (2013) Light Shining in the Forest
- (2016) The Death of an Owl

== The Paul Torday Memorial Prize ==
Paul Torday published his first novel Salmon Fishing in the Yemen at the age of 60. The family decided to set up this new prize in Torday's honour in 2019, celebrating first novels by authors aged 60 or over. The Paul Torday Memorial Prize was administered by the Society of Authors. After six successful years, the prize closed in 2024.

2019

- Winner: Anne Youngson for Meet Me at the Museum (Doubleday Ireland)
- Runner-up: Norma MacMaster for Silence Under a Stone (Doubleday)

Shortlisted:

- Su Bristow for Sealskin (Orenda Books)
- Sheila Llewllyn for Walking Wounded (Sceptre)
- Sally Magnusson for The Sealwoman's Gift (Two Roads)
- Heather Morris for The Tattooist of Auschwitz (Zaffre)

2020

- Winner: Donald Murray for As the Woman Lay Dreaming (Saraband)
- Runner-up: Gaby Koppel for Reparation (Honno Press)

Shortlisted:

- George Alagiah for The Burning Land (Canongate Books)
- Fiona Vigo Marshall for Find Me Falling (Fairlight Books)
- Rosalind Stopps for Hello, My Name Is May (HQ, HarperCollins Publishing)
- Euan Cameron for Madeleine (MacLehose Press)

2021

- Winner: Kathy O'Shaghnessey for In Love With George Elliot (Scribe UK)
- Runner-up: Karen Raney for All The Water In The World (John Murray Two Roads)

Shortlisted:

- Elfan Jones for Let Sleeping Dogs Lie
- Judith Amanthis for Dirt Clean
- Trevor Wood for The Man On The Street

2022

- Winner: Jane Fraser for Advent (Honno Press)
- Runner-up: Michael Mallon for The Disciple (Zuleika)

Shortlisted:

- John Fletcher for Wuhan (Head of Zeus)
- Anthony English for Death of a Coast Watcher (Monsoon Books)
- Yvonne Bailey-Smith for The Day I Fell Off My Island (Myriad Editions)

2023

- Winner: Bonnie Garmus for Lessons In Chemistry (Doubleday)
- Runner-up: Julie Owen Moylan for That Green Eyed Girl (Penguin Random House)

Shortlisted:

- Reverend Richard Coles for Murder Before Evensong (Weidenfeld & Nicolson)
- Tony Curtis for Darkness In The City Of light (Seren Books)
- Jonathan Franklin for Red Rose Green (Sparsile Books)

2024

- Winner: Jacqueline Crooks for Fire Rush (Jonathan Cape, Vintage)
- Runner-up: Fran Hill for Cuckoo in the Nest (Legend Press)

Shortlisted:

- Justine Gilbert for Daisy Chain (Claret Press)
- Hilary Taylor for Sea Defences (Eye Books)
- Michelene Wandor for Orfeo's Last Act (Greenwich Exchange)
