= James Hannaham =

American novelist and visual artist

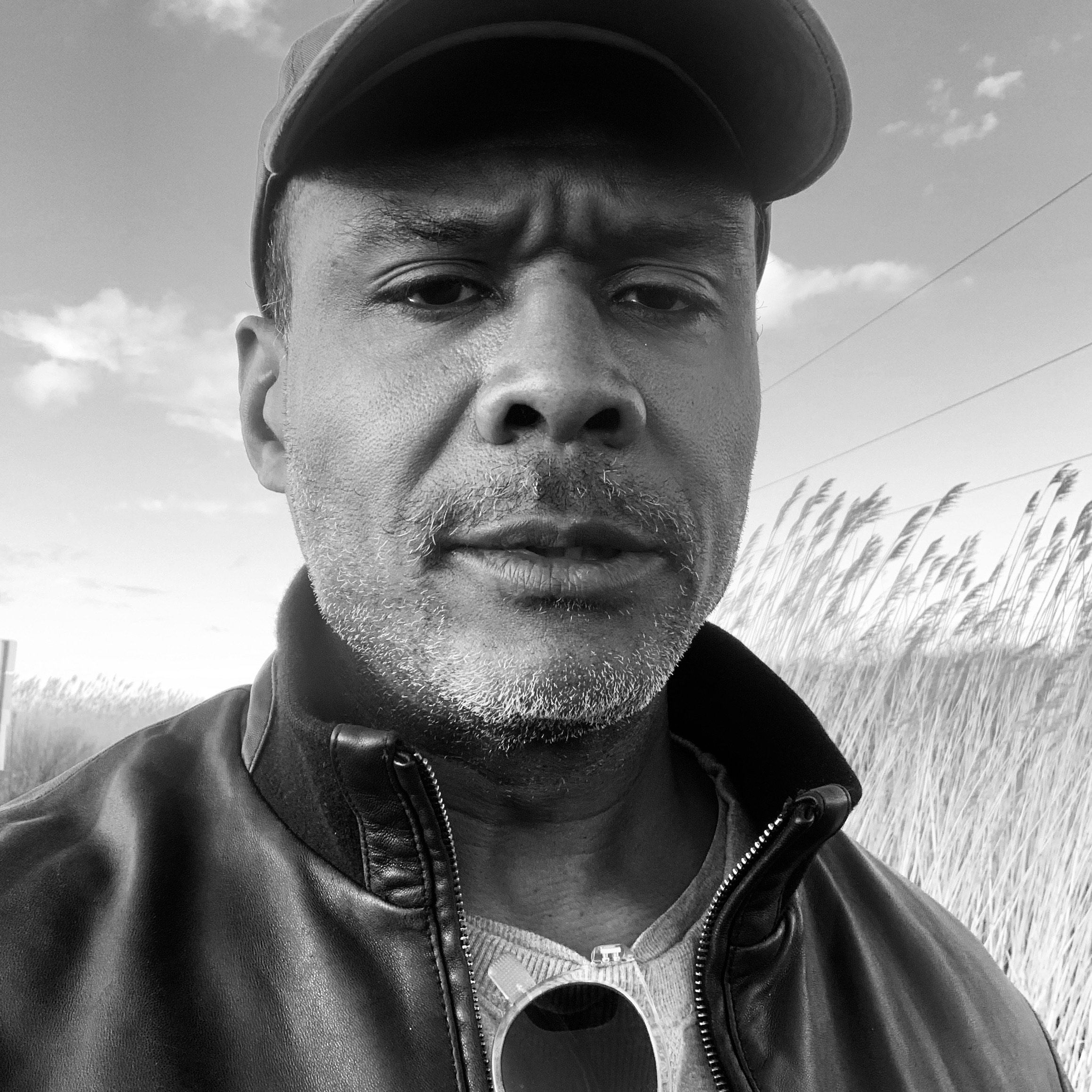
- Hannaham in 2020
- Born: 1968 (age 57–58); The Bronx, U.S.
- Occupations: Author; performer; visual artist; professor
- Spouse: Brendan Moroney
- Writing career
- Genres: Novel, short story
- Notable awards: PEN/Faulkner Award; Hurston/Wright Legacy Award
- Website: jameshannaham.com

James Hannaham (born 1968) is a writer, performer, and visual artist. His novel Delicious Foods (2015), which deals with human trafficking, won the PEN/Faulkner Award and the Hurston/Wright Legacy Award and was named one of Publishers Weekly's top ten books of the year. The New York Times called it an "ambitious, sweeping novel of American captivity and exploitation."

== Career ==
He studied art at Yale University and in 1992 began working in the art department of The Village Voice as well as writing for the paper. Later he studied creative writing at the Michener Center for Writers at the University of Texas.

His debut novel, God Says No (2009), was a Lambda Literary Award finalist and Stonewall Honor Book in Literature. He has published fiction in One Story, Fence, StoryQuarterly, and BOMB. He reviews theater and art for 4Columns.

He cofounded the New York City–based performance group Elevator Repair Service and worked with them 1992–2002. His text-based artworks often satirize the theoretical jargon that is used to describe visual art; his 2014 gallery show "Card Tricks" consisted of descriptive placards for fictive artworks, with titles such as "Planet" and "Nothing."

In 2020 his work Everything Is Normal, Everything Is Normal, Everything Is Fine, Everything Is Fine was judged Best in Show at a national juried exhibition of artist books and text-based visual works, Biblio Spectaculum.

Hannaham is a professor in the writing program at the Pratt Institute in Brooklyn, New York. His most recent published work is the 2022 novel Didn't Nobody Give a Shit What Happened to Carlotta.

== Personal life ==
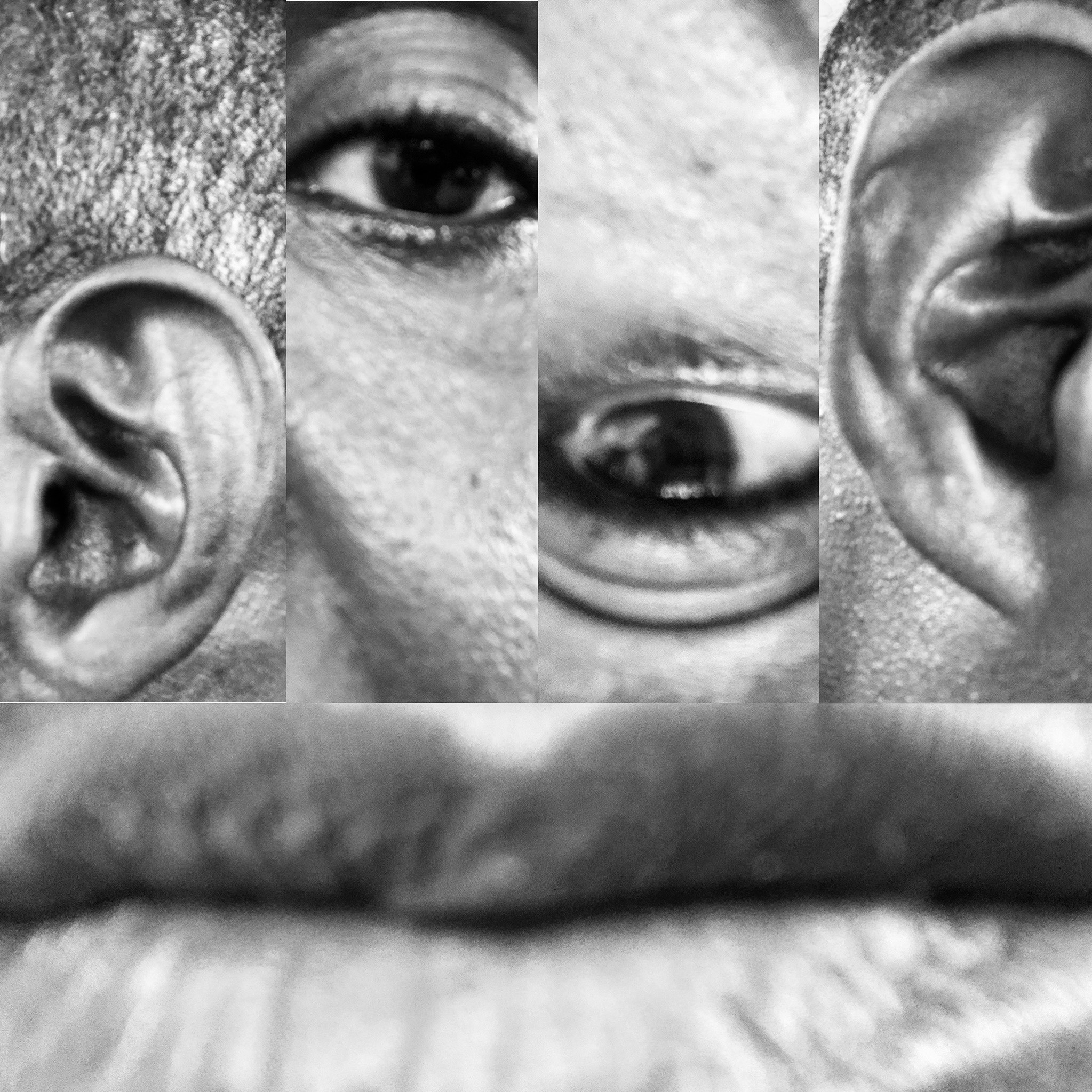
James Hannaham self-portrait collage

Hannaham was born in The Bronx and grew up in Yonkers, New York, where his mother was an investigative journalist. Hannaham has joked about being the reason his parents divorced shortly after his birth. His early experience was marked by the legal battle to end segregation in the Yonkers schools, which his mother covered for the radio. His cousin is the artist Kara Walker, who illustrated the cover of Delicious Foods. He is gay. Hannaham is married to Brendan Moroney, also from Yonkers. They met in 2004 and wed in 2015 in Brooklyn.

== Writing ==
=== Prose ===
- —— (2009). God Says No. McSweeney's Publishing. ISBN 9781934781401.
- —— (2015). Delicious Foods. Little, Brown and Company. ISBN 9780316284943.
- —— (2021). Pilot Imposter. Soft Skull Press. ISBN 9781593767013.
- —— (2022). Didn't Nobody Give a Shit What Happened to Carlotta. Little, Brown and Company. ISBN 9780316285278.
