= Lauren Oyler =

American author and critic

- Born: Hurricane, West Virginia, U.S.
- Education: Hurricane High School
- Alma mater: Yale University (BA)
- Occupations: Author, critic
- Writing career
- Language: English

Lauren Oyler is an American author and critic. Her debut novel, Fake Accounts, was published in February 2021.

== Early life and education ==
Oyler was born and raised in Hurricane, West Virginia, where she attended Hurricane High School and was named a National Merit Scholar. She graduated in 2012 from Yale University with a degree in English.

== Career ==
After graduating, Oyler moved to Berlin where she worked as a freelance copy editor. In 2015, she moved to New York to become an editor at Broadly, the now-defunct site on gender and identity for Vice. She also co-authored two books with Alyssa Mastromonaco about Mastromonaco's time in the Obama administration. Her work has appeared in Harper's Magazine, the London Review of Books, The New York Times Magazine, The Guardian, The New Yorker, The Baffler, and The New York Review of Books, among others. Her negative review of Jia Tolentino’s essay collection Trick Mirror generated so much traffic that it crashed the London Review of Books' website.

Her debut novel, Fake Accounts, was published by Catapult in February 2021.

Her essay collection, No Judgement, was published by HarperOne in 2024 to mixed reviews. In a review for Bookforum, Ann Manov criticized Oyler for overusing her personal experiences in her writing. Manov also criticized Oyler for using Google and Wikipedia instead of original research, which Sheila Heti also noted in an interview with Oyler.

== Publications ==
- Oyler, Lauren (2021). Fake Accounts. Catapult. ISBN 1948226928.
- Mastromonaco, Alyssa (2017). Who Thought This Was a Good Idea?: And Other Questions You Should Have Answers to When You Work in the White House. with Lauren Oyler. Little, Brown Book Group. ISBN 978-1455588220.
- Mastromonaco, Alyssa (2019). So Here's the Thing...: Notes on Growing Up, Getting Older, and Trusting Your Gut. with Lauren Oyler. Twelve. ISBN 978-1538731550.
- Oyler, Lauren (2024). No Judgment: Essays. HarperOne. ISBN 978-0063235359.
