= Andrew Lipstein =

American author

- Education: Haverford College
- Occupation: Author
- Spouse: Mette Lützhøft
- Children: 3
- Website: alipstein.com

Andrew Lipstein is an American author. He has written Last Resort (2022), The Vegan (2023), and Something Rotten (2025).

== Education and early life ==
Lipstein has a degree in mathematics from Haverford College.

== Writing career ==
He began writing for the student newspaper at Haverford College, eventually becoming its editor, and took a creative writing class. He began writing microfiction and other creative writing, and eventually wrote five unpublished manuscripts which he considers "embarrassing". He submitted a manuscript about a young writer to publishers under a pseudonym, hoping that they would believe he was an established writer trying to hide his identity. The manuscript was published as Last Resort in 2022. He later published The Vegan (2023), and Something Rotten (2025).

== Personal life ==
Lipstein is a vegetarian. He works for Robinhood Markets. He is married to Mette Lützhøft, a podcaster for Barron's. They have three sons.
