= Something Rotten (Lipstein novel) =

2025 novel by Andrew Lipstein

- Author: Andrew Lipstein
- Publisher: Farrar, Straus and Giroux
- Publication date: January 21, 2025
- ISBN: 9780374613358

Something Rotten is a literary novel by Andrew Lipstein. It was published by Farrar, Straus and Giroux in 2025.

== Plot summary ==
Reuben loses his job as an NPR radio host after accidentally performing a compromising act on a Zoom conference call. His wife Cecilie, a reporter for The New York Times, has family in Denmark and they decide to spend her maternity leave in Copenhagen. There, Cecilie is contacted by her ex-boyfriend Jonas, who has a life-threatening neurological condition. A disillusioned Reuben begins to cling to Mikkel, who represents the self-confidence and directness that Reuben feels he lacks.

== Themes ==
Reuben's feeling of emasculation and inefficacy are explored throughout the novel, exemplified by the loss of his job and his becoming a stay-at-home dad, and the linguistic and cultural barriers he finds in Denmark.

== Reception ==
Critics praised the novel's premise, plot twists and exploration of ethical quandaries.
