= Salmon Fishing in the Yemen (novel) =

2007 novel by Paul Torday

- First edition
- Author: Paul Torday
- Language: English
- Genre: Epistolary novel
- Publisher: Weidenfeld & Nicolson
- Publication date: 2007
- Publication place: United Kingdom
- Pages: 321 (1st edn.)

Salmon Fishing in the Yemen is a debut comedy novel written by Paul Torday and published in 2007.

Torday was 59 when the book was published. It is based on his extensive experiences of industry and government, as well as his personal interests in salmon fishing and the Middle East. Satirical themes in the novel focus on the 2000s Labour government of Tony Blair and its foreign policy dilemmas.

The novel won the 2007 Bollinger Everyman Wodehouse Prize for Comic Fiction and the 2007 Waverton Good Read Award. It was also shortlisted for the Newcomer of the Year Award at the 2008 Galaxy British Book Awards.

== Summary ==
Dr Alfred Jones is a civil servant at the National Centre for Fisheries Excellence. A shy, academic type, he is not attuned to the increasingly dull lovelessness of his marriage and why his chilly financier wife Mary has seized the chance to work abroad. When a rich Yemeni sheikh and angling enthusiast, Muhammad ibn Zaidi bani Tihama, offers to fund a scheme to populate the desert wadis of his country with Scottish salmon, Jones initially dismisses it as impossible and preposterous.

The British Foreign and Commonwealth Office is, however, keen to spend the sheikh's money. Jay Vent, the prime minister, and Patrick Maxwell, his spin doctor, are eager to lend support any positive Middle East initiative while Vent's prosecution of two wars in Iraq and Afghanistan are ongoing disasters. The scheme picks up momentum and Dr Jones is the only character who knows how it might actually be achieved.

The story is delivered in the form of a series of letters, e-mails, interview transcripts, newspaper articles and other non-narrative media. They range from fishing magazine editorials and entries in Hansard to exchanges between al-Qaeda operatives.

== Film adaptation ==
A screenplay adaptation of the novel was written by Simon Beaufoy and produced by Lionsgate and BBC Films. The film, rendered as a romantic comedy, starred Ewan McGregor as Dr Alfred Jones and Emily Blunt as Harriet Chetwode-Talbot. The government's spin doctor, Patrick Maxwell, was gender-swapped for Patricia Maxwell, portrayed by Kristin Scott Thomas.

Torday was particularly amused by the fact that, shortly after the film's release, British holidaymakers made enquiries to Yemeni tourism organisations asking about their real-life non-existent salmon fishing industry.

== See also ==
- Fishing in Yemen
