= British Book Awards =

British literary awards

The British Book Awards
- (The Nibbies)
- Awarded for: Authors and illustrators who have stirred the heart and imagination
- Date: 11 May 2026
- Location: JW Marriott Grosvenor House Hotel, London
- Country: United Kingdom
- Presented by: The Bookseller
- Formerly called: The National Book Awards; The Galaxy National Book Awards; The Specsavers National Book Awards
- First award: 1990; 36 years ago
- Website: thebookseller.com/events/the-british-book-awards
- Related: The Book Trade Awards; The YA Book Prize; The British Book Design and Production Awards

The British Book Awards or the 'Nibbies' are literary awards for the best UK writers and their works, administered by the British magazine The Bookseller, which reports news on the publishing industry. The awards have had several previous names, owners and sponsors since being launched in 1990, including the National Book Awards from 2010 to 2014.

== Book award history ==
The British Book Awards ran from 1990 to 2009 and were founded by the editor of Publishing News. The awards were then acquired by Agile Marketing, which renamed them the National Book Awards and called them the Galaxy National Book Awards (2010–2011) and later the Specsavers National Book Awards (2012–2014) after their headline sponsors. There were no National Book Awards after 2014; in 2017 the awards were acquired by The Bookseller from the estate of Publishing News' founder, Fred Newman, and renamed back to The British Book Awards or the Nibbies.

In 2018, a Specsavers National Book Awards ceremony was held on 20 November but was unrelated to the Nibbies.

In 2005, The Bookseller launched a separate scheme, The Bookseller Retail Awards (winners not listed in this article). In 2010, running parallel to the National Book Awards, The Bookseller unified the Nibbies with its retail awards to produce The Bookseller Industry Awards (winners not listed in this article).

The awards are known as the 'Nibbies' because of the golden nib-shaped trophy given to winners.

== Name history ==
- 1990–2009: The British Book Awards
- 2010–2011: Galaxy National Book Awards
- 2012–2014: Specsavers National Book Awards
- 2015–2016: no awards
- 2017–Pres: The British Book Awards

== Award winners (recent) ==
=== 2026 Books of the Year ===
Three new categories were introduced for the 2026 awards, Graphic Novel, Romantic Fiction and Science Fiction & Fantasy, with the latter two replacing the previous Pageturner category.

Presented: 11 May 2026 – Venue: Grosvenor House Hotel, London.
Overall Book of the Year
Nobody's Girl by Virginia Roberts Giuffre, co-written by Amy Wallace (Doubleday)
Author of the Year	Illustrator of the Year	Fiction Book of the Year
A. F. Steadman; Mick Herron; Ruth Jones; Charlie Mackesy; Freida McFadden; Elif Shafak	Dav Pilkey; Huw Aaron; Ingela P. Arrhenius; Emily Gravett; Tom Percival; Mikey Please	Boleyn Traitor by Philippa Gregory (HarperCollins); Dream Count by Chimamanda Ngozi Adichie (Fourth Estate); Heart the Lover by Lily King (Canongate); My Friends by Fredrik Backman (S&S); The Rose Field: The Book of Dust by Philip Pullman (Penguin & David Fickling Books); Strange Pictures by Uketsu, translated by Jim Rion (Pushkin Vertigo)
Debut Book of the Year	Crime & Thriller Book of the Year	Non-Fiction: Narrative Book of the Year
The Names by Florence Knapp (Phoenix); The Artist by Lucy Steeds (John Murray); The Boy from the Sea by Garrett Carr (Picador); Fundamentally by Nussaibah Younis (Weidenfeld & Nicolson); The House of Wolf by Tony Robinson (Sphere); Nesting by Roisín O'Donnell (Scribner UK, Simon & Schuster UK)	A Case of Mice and Murder by Sally Smith (Bloomsbury); Death at the White Hart by Chris Chibnall (Michael Joseph); The God of the Woods by Liz Moore (The Borough Press); The Impossible Fortune by Richard Osman (Penguin General); The Secret of Secrets by Dan Brown (Penguin); The Tenant (Freida McFadden, Poisoned Pen Press)	Nobody's Girl: A Memoir of Surviving Abuse and Fighting for Justice by Virginia Roberts Giuffre, co-written by Amy Wallace (Doubleday); Careless People by Sarah Wynn-Williams (Macmillan); Entitled by Andrew Lownie (HarperCollins); Last Rites by Ozzy Ozbourne (Sphere); A Mind of My Own by Kathy Burke (Gallery); Mother Mary Comes to Me by Arundhati Roy (Hamish Hamilton)
Non-Fiction: Lifestyle & Illustrated Book of the Year	Science Fiction & Fantasy Book of the Year	Romantic Fiction Book of the Year
Forgotten Churches by Luke Sherlock, illustrated by Ioana Pioaru (Frances Lincoln); Always Remember by Charlie Mackesy (Ebury Press); Eat Yourself Healthy by Jamie Oliver (Michael Joseph); Padella by Tim Siadatan (Bloomsbury); Protein in 15 by Joe Wicks (Leap); To the Women by Donna Ashworth (Black & White)	Alchemised by SenLinYu (Penguin Michael Joseph); Brimstone by Callie Hart (Hodderscape); Ice by Jacek Dukaj, translated by Ursula Phillips (Head of Zeus); Katabasis by R. F. Kuang (HarperVoyager); Onyx Storm by Rebecca Yarros (Piaktus); The Devils by Joe Abercrombie (Gollancz)	Great Big Beautiful Life by Emily Henry (Viking); All Together for Christmas by Sarah Morgan (HQ Fiction); An Almost Perfect Summer by Jill Mansell (Headline Review); King of Envy by Ana Huang (Piatkus); Our Sweet Violet by Rosie Goodwin (Zaffre Books & Bonnier); The Strawberry Patch Pancake House by Laurie Gilmore (One More Chapter)
Children's Fiction Book of the Year	Children's Non-fiction & Illustrated Book of the Year	Discover Book of the Year
Sunrise on the Reaping by Suzanne Collins (Scholastic); The Adventures of Rap Kid by MC Grammar (Gallery Kids); Fearless by Lauren Roberts (S&S Children's); A Language of Dragons by S. F. Williamson (HarperCollins Children's); Lottie Brooks vs the Ultra Mean Girls by Katie Kirby, illustrated Katie Kirby (Puffin); Skandar and the Spirit War by A. F. Steadman (S&S Children's)	Oh Dear, Look What I Got! by Michael Rosen, illustrated by Helen Oxenbury (Walker Books); Fold Out + Play: Doll's House Illustrated by Ingela P. Arrhenius (Nosy Crow); My Rice Is Best by Selina Brown, illustrated by Maxwell Oginni (Puffin); Sammy Feels Shy by Tom Percival, illustrated by Tom Percival (Bloomsbury Children's); The Wizard's Guide to Magical Experiments by A. J. Wood, illustrated by Jo Rioux (Magic Cat Publishing); You and Your Body by Punam Krishan (DK)	The Mercy Step by Marcia Hutchinson (Cassava Republic Press); The Age of Olive Trees by Haia Mohammed (Out-Spoken Press); Beyond/Tu Hwnt by Bethany Handley, Megan Angharad Hunter and Sioned Erin Hughes (Lucent Dreaming); Human, Animal by Seth Insua (Verve); The Other Father Christmas by Serena Holly (Storymix Books); The Science of Racism by Keon West (Picador)
Graphic Novel Book of the Year	Audiobook: Non-Fiction Book of the Year	Audiobook: Fiction Book of the Year
Bunny vs Monkey: Intergalatic Monkey Business by Jamie Smart (David Fickling Books); Dog Man: Big Jim Believes by Dav Pilkey (Scholastic); Ginseng Roots by Craig Thompson (Faber); InvestiGators: Case Files by John Patrick Green with Steve Behling and Chris Fenoglio (Macmillan Children's); This Slavery by Ethel Carnie Holdsworth, adapted by Scarlett & Sophie Rickard (SelfMadeHero); Who Killed Nessie? by Paul Cornell and Rachael Smith (Avery Hill Publishing)	Careless People by Sarah Wynn-Williams, narrated by Sarah Wynn-Williams (Macmillan); The Deep Magic of Daily Consistency: A Life-Changing Way to Set Your Greatness Free by Robin Sharma, narrated by Robin Sharma (Bolinda Originals); Entitled by Andrew Lownie, narrated by Andrew Lownie (William Collins); A Mind of My Own by Kathy Burke, narrated by Kathy Burke (S&S); Moral Ambition by Rutger Bregman, narrated by Boris Hiestand with Rutger Bregman (Bloomsbury); When Gavin Met Stacey and Everything in Between: A Story of Love and Friendship by Ruth Jones and James Corden, narrated by Ruth Jones and James Corden (Transworld)	Cursed Daughters by Oyinkan Braithwaite, narrated by Weruche Opia, Diana Yekinni and Nnei Opia Clark (WF Howes); Beautiful Ugly by Alice Feeney, narrated by Richard Armitage and Tuppence Middleton (Macmillan); The Long Shoe by Bob Mortimer, narrated by Bob Mortimer, Diane Morgan and Arabella Weir (S&S); One of Us by Elizabeth Day, narrated by Richard Armitage, Oliver Chris, Emilia Fox, Genevieve Gaunt and Bella Maclean (Fourth Estate); Pride and Prejudice bu Jane Austen, adapted by Lulu Raczka, narrated by Marisa Abela, Harris Dickinson, Glenn Close, Marianne Jean-Baptiste, Bill Nighy, Sophie Wilde, Will Poulter, Jessie Buckley, et al. (Audible Originals); The Rose Field: The Book of Dust by Philip Pullman and Christopher Wormell, narrated by Michael Sheen (Penguin & David Fickling)

=== 2025 Books of the Year ===
Presented: 12 May 2025 – Venue: Grosvenor House Hotel, London.
Overall Book of the Year	Author of the Year	Illustrator of the Year
Patriot by Alexei Navalny (Bodley Head)	Percival Everett	Rob Biddulph
Fiction Book of the Year	Debut Book of the Year	Crime & Thriller Book of the Year
James by Percival Everett (Mantle); All Fours by Miranda July; You Are Here by David Nicholls; Intermezzo by Sally Rooney; Long Island by Colm Tóibín; Think Again by Jacqueline Wilson	Butter by Asako Yuzuki, translated by Polly Barton (Fourth Estate); The Ministry of Time by Kaliane Bradley; The List of Suspicious Things by Jennie Godfrey; Green Dot by Madeleine Gray; Glorious Exploits by Ferdia Lennon; When the Moon Hatched by Sarah A. Parker	Hunted by Abir Mukherjee (Harvill Secker); Guilty by Definition by Susie Dent; The Wrong Sister by Claire Douglas; Has Anyone Seen Charlotte Salter? by Nicci French; We Solve Murders by Richard Osman; All the Colours of the Dark by Chris Whitaker
Non-Fiction: Narrative Book of the Year	Non-Fiction: Lifestyle & Illustrated Book of the Year	Pageturner of the Year
Patriot by Alexei Navalny (Bodley Head); All That Matters by Chris Hoy; I Haven't Been Entirely Honest with You by Miranda Hart; Raising Hare by Chloe Dalton, illustrated by Denise Nestor; Unleashed by Boris Johnson; Want by Gillian Anderson and anonymous	What I Ate in One Year by Stanley Tucci (Fig Tree); A Better Second Half by Liz Earle; Drawn to the Garden by Caroline Quentin; Greekish by Georgina Hayden; So Good by Emily English, Spud Man's Spudtacular Baked Potato Cookbook by Spud Man	Faebound by Saara El-Arifi (Piatkus, Little, Brown Book Group); The Christmas Tree Farm by Laurie Gilmore; Daydream by Hannah Grace; House of Flame and Shadow by Sarah J. Maas; Our Fair Lily by Rosie Goodwin; Someone Else's Shoes by Jojo Moyes
Children's Fiction Book of the Year	Children's Non-Fiction Book of the Year	Children's Illustrated Book of the Year
Diary of a Wimpy Kid: Hot Mess by Jeff Kinney (Puffin); I Am Rebel by Ross Montgomery; The Majorly Awkward BFF Dramas of Lottie Brooks by Katie Kirby; The Reappearance of Rachel Price by Holly Jackson; Reckless by Lauren Roberts; A Tempest of Tea by Hafsah Faizal	Wilding: How to Bring Wildlife Back by Isabella Tree, illustrated by Angela Harding (Macmillan Children's Books ); Hamza's Wild World by Hamza Yassin, illustrated by Louise Forshaw; The History of Information by Chris Haughton; Little People, Big Dreams: Taylor Swift by Maria Isabel Sánchez Vegara, illustrated by Borghild Fallberg; Science is Lit by Big Manny, illustrated by Subi Bosa; The World to Come by Robert Macfarlane and Johnny Flynn, illustrated by Emily Sutton	Jonty Gentoo: The Adventures of a Penguin by Julia Donaldson, illustrated by Axel Scheffler (Alison Green Books); Bunny vs Monkey: The Great Big Glitch by Jamie Smart; Dog Man: The Scarlet Shedder by Dav Pilkey; Letters from the North Pole by Annie Atkins, illustrated by Fia Tobing; Pablo and Splash by Sheena Dempsey; There's a Poonami in My House by Chris and Rosie Ramsey, illustrated by Paula Bowles
Discover Book of the Year	Audiobook: Non-Fiction Book of the Year	Audiobook: Fiction of the Year
poyums by Len Pennie, (Canongate); An African History of Africa by Zeinab Badawi; Fragile Animals by Genevieve Jagger; Out on a Limb by Hannah Bonam-Young; These Letters End in Tears by Musih Tedji Xaviere; Tiananmen Square by Lai Wen	Sociopath by Patric Gagne, narrated by Patric Gagne (Brazen, Octopus Publishing); Henry V by Dan Jones; Never Enough: My Words Unfiltered by Pete Wicks; Nexus by Yuval Noah Harari, narrated by Vidish Athavale; Unleashed by Boris Johnson, Want by Gillian Anderson and anonymous	My Favourite Mistake by Marian Keyes, narrated by Marian Keyes (Penguin Random House); 1984 by George Orwell, adapted by Joe White, narrated by Andrew Garfield, Cynthia Erivo, Andrew Scott, Tom Hardy, Chukwudi Iwuji, Romesh Ranganathan, Natasia Demetriou, Francesca Mills, Alex Lawther and Katie Leung; Bunny vs Monkey by Jamie Smart, narrated by Ciaran Saward; The Hotel Avocado by Bob Mortimer, narrated by Bob Mortimer, Paul Whitehouse, Sally Phillips and Julie Maisey; The Life Impossible by Matt Haig, narrated by Joanna Lumley and Jordan Stephens; You Are Here by David Nicholls, narrated by Lee Ingleby and Lydia Leonard

=== 2024 Books of the Year ===
The shortlisted nominees were announced on 8 March 2024. Once again the in-person ceremony was livestreamed. Katherine Rundell was named Author of the Year, the first time that a children's writer received the accolade since Philip Pullman in 2018. In the run up to the awards ceremony, a daily podcast featuring nominated authors was made available online.

Presented: 13 May 2024 – Venue: Grosvenor House Hotel, London.
Overall Book of the Year	Author of the Year	Illustrator of the year
Murdle by G. T. Karber (Souvenir Press, Profile Books)	Katherine Rundell	Jamie Smart
Fiction Book of the Year	Debut Book of the Year	Crime and Thriller Book of the Year
Yellowface by Rebecca F. Kuang (The Borough Press, HarperCollins); Iron Flame by Rebecca Yarros (Piatkus, Little, Brown Book Group); So Late in the Day by Claire Keegan (Faber); Atlas: The Story of Pa Salt by Lucinda Riley and Harry Whittaker (Macmillan, Pan Macmillan); Tackle! by Jilly Cooper (Bantam, Transworld); The Ghost Ship by Kate Mosse (Mantle, Pan Macmillan)	In Memoriam by Alice Winn (Viking, Penguin General); Talking at Night by Claire Daverley (Penguin, Michael Joseph); The List by Yomi Adegoke (Fourth Estate, HarperCollins); Godkiller by Hannah Kaner (HarperVoyager, HarperCollins); Really Good, Actually by Monica Heisey (Fourth Estate, HarperCollins); Days at the Morisaki Bookshop by Satoshi Yagisawa, translated by Eric Ozawa, illustrated by Ilya Milstein (Manilla Press, Bonnier Books UK)	None of This Is True by Lisa Jewell (Century, Cornerstone); The Woman Who Lied by Claire Douglas (Penguin, Michael Joseph); The Last Devil To Die by Richard Osman (Viking, Penguin General); Damascus Station by David McCloskey (Swift Press); The Running Grave by Robert Galbraith (Sphere, Little, Brown); The Secret Hours by Mick Herron (Baskerville, John Murray Press)
Non-fiction: Narrative Book of the Year	Non-fiction: Lifestyle and Illustrated	Page-turner of the Year
Politics on the Edge by Rory Stewart (Jonathan Cape, Vintage); The Extra Mile: My Autobiography by Kevin Sinfield, with Paul Hayward (Century, Cornerstone Publishing); The Diary of a CEO: The 33 Laws of Business and Life by Steven Bartlett (Ebury Edge, Ebury); Normal Women – 900 Years of Making History by Philippa Gregory (William Collins, HarperCollins); Spare by Prince Harry (Bantam, Transworld); The Woman in Me by Britney Spears (Gallery Books, Simon & Schuster)	Murdle by G. T. Karber (Souvenir Press, Profile Books); Bored of Lunch: The Healthy Air Fryer Book by Nathan Anthony, illustrated by Sophie Yamamoto (Ebury Press, Ebury); Ultra-Processed People by Chris van Tulleken (Cornerstone Press); Marr's Guitars by Johnny Marr (Thames and Hudson); GHOSTS: The Button House Archives by Mathew Baynton, Simon Farnaby, Martha Howe-Douglas, Jim Howick, Laurence Rickard and Ben Willbond (Bloomsbury General); Let the Light Pour In by Lemn Sissay (Canongate)	Fourth Wing by Rebecca Yarros (Piatkus, Little, Brown Book Group); Tomorrow, and Tomorrow, and Tomorrow by Gabrielle Zevin (Vintage); Demon Copperhead by Barbara Kingsolver (Faber); The Lost Bookshop by Evie Woods (One More Chapter, HarperCollins); It Starts with Us by Colleen Hoover (Simon & Schuster); Icebreaker by Hannah Grace (Simon & Schuster)
Children's Fiction Book of the Year	Children's Non-fiction Book of the Year	Children's Illustrated Book of the Year
Impossible Creatures by Katherine Rundell, illustrated by Daniel Egnéus, Tomislav Tomić and Virginia Allyn (Bloomsbury Children's Books); Skandar and the Phantom Rider by A. F. Steadman (Simon & Schuster Children's Books); This Book Kills by Ravena Guron, cover illustrator Leo Nickolls (Usborne); The Boy Who Slept Through Christmas by Matt Lucas, illustrated by Forest Burdett (Farshore, HarperCollins); The Completely Chaotic Christmas of Lottie Brooks by Katie Kirby (Puffin, Penguin Random House Children's); Powerless by Lauren Roberts (Simon & Schuster Children's Books)	Brilliant Black British History by Atinuke, illustrated by Kingsley Nebechi (Bloomsbury Children's Books); Stolen History: The Truth About the British Empire and How It Shaped Us by Sathnam Sanghera (Puffin, Penguin Random House Children's); Little People, Big Dreams: King Charles by Maria Isabel Sánchez Vegara, illustrated by Matt Hunt (Frances Lincoln, Quarto); Black & Irish: Legends, Trailblazers & Everyday Heroes by Leon Diop, Briana Fitzsimons, illustrated by Jessica Louis (Little Island Books); Kay's Incredible Inventions by Adam Kay, illustrated by Henry Paker (Puffin, Penguin Random House Children's); The Boy Who Didn't Want to Die by Peter Lantos (Scholastic)	Bunny vs Monkey: Multiverse Mix-up by Jamie Smart, illustrated by Jamie Smart (David Fickling Books); This Is Me by George Webster, in collaboration with Claire Taylor, illustrated by Tim Budgen (Scholastic); Dog Man: Twenty Thousand Fleas Under the Sea by Dav Pilkey, illustrated by Dav Pilkey (Scholastic); Heartstopper: Volume 5 by Alice Oseman, illustrated by Alice Oseman (Hodder Children's Books, Hachette Children's Group); We're Going on a Ghost Hunt by Martha Mumford, illustrated by Cherie Zamazing (Bloomsbury Children's Books); The King's Pants by Nicholas Allan, illustrated by Nicholas Allan (Andersen Press)
Discover Book of the Year	Non-fiction Audiobook of the Year	Fiction Audiobook of the Year
Lessons from Our Ancestors by Raksha Dave, illustrated by Kimberlie Clinthorne-Wong (Magic Cat Publishing); Imad's Syrian Kitchen by Imad Alarnab, illustrated by Evi-O.Studio (HQ, HarperCollins); A Bollywood State of Mind by Sunny Singh (Footnote Press); April's Garden by Isla McGuckin, illustrated by Catalina Echeverri (Graffeg); Sunburn by Chloe Michelle Howarth (Verve Books); Pageboy by Elliot Page (Doubleday, Transworld)	Strong Female Character by Fern Brady, narrated by Fern Brady (Brazen, Octopus Publishing); The Diary of a CEO: The 33 Laws of Business and Life by Steven Bartlett, narrated by Steven Bartlett (Ebury Edge, Penguin Random House Audio); Unruly: A History of England's Kings and Queens by David Mitchell, narrated by David Mitchell (Michael Joseph, Penguin Random House Audio); Spare by Prince Harry, Duke of Sussex, narrated by Prince Harry, Duke of Sussex (Bantam/Transworld, Penguin Random House Audio); Big Beacon by Alan Partridge, narrated by Alan Partridge (Seven Dials, Orion Publishing Group); Making It So by Sir Patrick Stewart, narrated by Sir Patrick Stewart (Gallery UK, Simon & Schuster UK)	None of This Is True by Lisa Jewell, narrated by Nicola Walker and Louise Brealey (Cornerstone, Penguin Random House Audio); The List by Yomi Adegoke, narrated by Sheila Atim and Arinzé Kene (Fourth Estate, HarperCollins); The Running Grave by Robert Galbraith, narrated by Robert Glenister (Sphere, Little, Brown Audio); Poor Things by Alasdair Gray, narrated by Russ Bain and Kathryn Drysdale (W. F. Howes); The Housemaid's Secret by Freida McFadden, narrated by Lauryn Allman (Bookouture); Impossible Creatures by Katherine Rundell, narrated by Samuel West (Bloomsbury Children's Books)

=== 2023 Books of the Year ===
The shortlisted nominees were announced on 17 March 2023. Once again the in-person ceremony was livestreamed. In 2023 the Non-fiction: Lifestyle Book of the Year category was expanded to include Illustrated books.

Salman Rushdie was recognised with a special Freedom to Publish honour. It is only the second time that the British Book Awards regime has conferred this prize, previously being awarded in 2022 to HarperCollins UK and its publishing director Arabella Pike "in recognition of their defense of [their] authors against interference from Russian oligarchs, and for their 'robust defense of investigative non-fiction and publishing in the public interest."

Presented: 15 May 2023 – Venue: Grosvenor House Hotel, London.
Overall Book of the Year	Author of the Year	Illustrator of the year
Menopausing by Davina McCall with Dr. Naomi Potter (HQ)	Bonnie Garmus	Alice Oseman
Fiction Book of the Year	Debut Book of the Year	Crime and Thriller Book of the Year
Babel by R. F. Kuang (HarperVoyager); Love Marriage by Monica Ali (Virago); Stone Blind by Natalie Haynes (Mantle Books); Fairy Tale by Stephen King (Hodder & Stoughton); The Marriage Portrait by Maggie O'Farrell (Tinder Press); Young Mungo by Douglas Stuart (Picador)	Trespasses by Louise Kennedy (Bloomsbury); Honey & Spice by Bolu Babalola (Headline Review); Lessons in Chemistry by Bonnie Garmus (Doubleday); The Rabbit Hutch by Tess Gunty (Oneworld Publications); The Satsuma Complex by Bob Mortimer (Gallery, Simon & Schuster); The Whalebone Theatre by Joanna Quinn (Fig Tree, Penguin Random House)	The Twyford Code by Janice Hallett (Viper Books, Profile Books); Murder Before Evensong by Reverend Richard Coles (W&N); The Paris Apartment by Lucy Foley (HarperFiction); Wrong Place, Wrong Time by Gillian McAllister (Michael Joseph); The Bullet That Missed by Richard Osman (Viking Books); Bamburgh by LJ Ross (Dark Skies Publishing)
Non-fiction: Narrative Book of the Year	Non-fiction: Lifestyle and Illustrated	Page-turner of the Year
Super-Infinite: The Transformations of John Donne by Katherine Rundell (Faber and Faber); brother.do.you.love.me by Manni Coe and Reuben Coe (Little Toller Books); A Visible Man by Edward Enninful (Bloomsbury); Tired and Tested: The Wild Ride into Parenthood by Sophie McCartney (HarperNorth); Friends, Lovers and the Big Terrible Thing by Matthew Perry (Headline Nonfiction); Madly, Deeply: The Alan Rickman Diaries by Alan Rickman (Canongate Books)	Menopausing by Davina McCall with Dr. Naomi Potter (HQ); The Story of Art without Men by Katy Hessel (Hutchinson Heinemann); One: Simple One-Pan Wonders by Jamie Oliver (Michael Joseph); The Golden Mole by Katherine Rundell, illustrated by Talya Baldwin (Faber and Faber); Why Has Nobody Told Me This Before? by Dr Julie Smith (Michael Joseph); The Climate Book by Greta Thunberg et al. (Allen Lane)	Verity by Colleen Hoover (Sphere Books); The Summer That Changed Us by Cathy Bramley (Orion Fiction); Sunday's Child by Dilly Court (HarperFiction); How To Kill Your Family by Bella Mackie (The Borough Press); The Keeper of Stories by Sally Page (One More Chapter); The Island of Missing Trees by Elif Shafak (Viking Books)
Children's Fiction Book of the Year	Children's Non-fiction Book of the Year	Children's Illustrated Book of the Year
Tyger by S. F. Said, illustrated by Dave McKean (David Fickling Books); Diary of a Wimpy Kid: Diper Överlöde by Jeff Kinney (Puffin); Onyeka and the Academy of the Sun by Tọlá Okogwu (Simon & Schuster Children's Books UK); The First to Die at the End by Adam Silvera (Simon & Schuster Children's Books UK); Skandar and the Unicorn Thief by A. F. Steadman (Simon & Schuster Children's Books UK); Loki: A Bad God's Guide to Being Good by Louie Stowell (Walker Books)	A Better Day: Your Positive Mental Health Handbook by Dr Alex George and illustrated by The Boy Fitz Hammond (Wren & Rook, Hachette); Am I Made of Stardust?: Dr Maggie Answers the Big Questions for Young Scientists by Dr Maggie Aderin-Pocock and illustrator Chelen Ecija (Buster Books); Girlhood Unfiltered by Ebinehita Iyere (Knights Of); You Can Do It: How to Find Your Voice and Make a Difference by Marcus Rashford and Carl Anka (Macmillan Children's Books); Queen Elizabeth: (Volume 88) Little People, Big Dreams by Maria Isabel Sanchez Vegara and illustrator Melissa Lee Johnson (Frances Lincoln Children's Books); You Don't Know What War Is: The Diary of a Young Girl From Ukraine by Yeva Skalietska (Bloomsbury)	Grandad's Camper by Harry Woodgate (Andersen Press); What the Ladybird Heard at Christmas by Julia Donaldson and Lydia Monks (Macmillan Children's Books); The Baddies by Julia Donaldson and Axel Scheffler (Alison Green Books, Scholastic); Supertato presents Jack and the Beanstalk by Sue Hendra and Paul Linnet (Simon & Schuster Children's Books); The Heartstopper Yearbook by Alice Oseman (Hodder Children's Books); Bunny vs Monkey: Rise of the Maniacal Badger by Jamie Smart (David Fickling Books)
Discover Book of the Year	Non-fiction Audiobook of the Year	Fiction Audiobook of the Year
I'm a Fan by Sheena Patel (Rough Trade); The Secret Diaries of Charles Ignatius Sancho by Paterson Joseph (Dialogue Books); As Long As the Lemon Trees Grow by Zoulfa Katouh (Bloomsbury); Carrie Kills A Man by Carrie Marshall (404 Ink); Home Is Not a Place by Johny Pitts and Roger Robinson (William Collins); Aftermath by Preti Taneja (And Other Stories)	A Pocketful of Happiness written and narrated by Richard E. Grant (Gallery UK, Simon & Schuster); Parenting Hell written and narrated Rob Beckett and Josh Widdicombe (Blink Publishing); A Visible Man written and narrated by Edward Enninful (Audible Original); Ten Steps to Nanette written and narrated by Hannah Gadsby (W. F. Howes); Menopausing written and narrated by Davina McCall and Dr. Naomi Potter (HarperCollins); Friends, Lovers and the Big Terrible Thing written and narrated by Matthew Perry (Headline Publishing Group)	Young Mungo by Douglas Stuart, narrated by Chris Reilly (Picador); Geneva by Richard Armitage, narrated by Richard Armitage, Nicola Walker and Jane Perry (Audible Original); The Seven Moons of Maali Almeida by Shehan Karunatilaka, narrated by Shivantha Wijesinha (Bolinda Publishing); The Bullet That Missed by Richard Osman, narrated by Fiona Shaw (Penguin Audio); The Discworld Series by Terry Pratchett, narrated by Bill Nighy, Indira Varma, Andy Serkis, Colin Morgan, Peter Serafinowicz et al. (Penguin Audio); Tyger by S. F. Said, narrated by Sarah Agha (Bolinda Publishing)

=== 2022 Books of the Year ===
The shortlisted nominees were announced on 25 March 2022. This year marked the return to the first live awards ceremony since 2019 but was also broadcast as a livestream.

A new category of Discover Book of the Year was introduced aiming to showcase traditionally underrepresented authors with a particular focus on the work of indie presses and imprints. Alongside this, also new for 2022, was a split of the Children's Awards into non-fiction and illustrated, in addition to the fiction award, and a split of the Audiobook of the Year award into Fiction audiobook of the Year and Non-fiction audiobook of the Year.

Presented: 23 May 2022 – Venue: Grosvenor House Hotel, London.
Overall Book of the Year	Author of the Year	Illustrator of the year
You Are a Champion by Marcus Rashford and Carl Anka (Macmillan Children's Books)	Marian Keyes	Dapo Adeola
Fiction Book of the Year	Debut Book of the Year	Crime and Thriller Book of the Year
Sorrow and Bliss by Meg Mason (Weidenfeld & Nicolson); The Passenger by Ulrich Alexander Boschwitz (Pushkin Press); Cloud Cuckoo Land by Anthony Doerr (Fourth Estate); Klara and the Sun by Kazuo Ishiguro (Faber and Faber); Empire of the Vampire by Jay Kristoff (HarperVoyager); Beautiful World, Where are You by Sally Rooney (Faber and Faber)	Open Water by Caleb Azumah Nelson (Viking Books); Assembly by Natasha Brown (Hamish Hamilton); Mrs Death Misses Death by Salena Godden (Canongate Books); Luster by Raven Leilani (Picador); How to Kill Your Family by Bella Mackie (Borough Press); She Who Became the Sun by Shelley Parker-Chan (Mantle Books)	The Dark Remains by William McIlvanney and Ian Rankin (Canongate Books); Girl A by Abigail Dean (HarperFiction); The Appeal by Janice Hallett (Viper Books, Profile Books); A Slow Fire Burning by Paula Hawkins (Doubleday); 1979 by Val McDermid (Sphere Books); The Man Who Died Twice by Richard Osman (Viking Books)
Non-fiction: Narrative Book of the Year	Non-fiction: Lifestyle Book of the Year	Page-turner of the Year
Empireland: How Imperialism has Shaped Modern Britain by Sathnam Sanghera (Viking Books); Windswept and Interesting by Billy Connolly (Two Roads); Vaxxers by Sarah Gilbert and Catherine Green (Hodder & Stoughton); This Much Is True by Miriam Margolyes (John Murray Press); And Away... by Bob Mortimer (Gallery UK, Simon & Schuster); Empire of Pain by Patrick Radden Keefe (Picador)	The Lyrics: 1956 to the Present by Paul McCartney (Allen Lane); Pinch of Nom: Comfort Food by Kate Allinson and Kay Featherstone (Bluebird, Pan Macmillan); Diddly Squat: A Year on the Farm by Jeremy Clarkson (Michael Joseph); Jane's Patisserie by Jane Dunn (Ebury); ONE: Pot, Pan, Planet by Anna Jones (Fourth Estate); Celebrating the Seasons with the Yorkshire Shepherdess by Amanda Owen (Macmillan)	Small Pleasures by Claire Chambers (Weidenfeld & Nicolson); Worst. Idea. Ever. by Jane Fallon (Michael Joseph); The Wolf Den by Elodie Harper (Head of Zeus); The Party Crasher by Sophie Kinsella (Bantam Press); The Summer Seekers by Sarah Morgan (HQ); The Last House on Needless Street by Catriona Ward (Viper Books, Profile Books)
Children's Fiction Book of the Year	Children's Non-fiction Book of the Year	Children's Illustrated Book of the Year
When the Sky Falls by Phil Earle (Andersen Press); Ace of Spades by Faridah Àbíké-Íyímídé, illustrated by Kingsley Nebechi (Usborne); The Last Bear by Hannah Gold, illustrated by Levi Pinfold (HarperCollins Children's Books); You'll Be the Death of Me by Karen M. McManus (Penguin Random House Children's); The Christmas Pig by J. K. Rowling, illustrated by Jim Field (Little, Brown Books for Young Readers)	You Are a Champion by Marcus Rashford and Carl Anka (Macmillan Children's Books); A Different Sort of Normal written and illustrated by Abigail Balfe (Puffin); Grown: The Black Girls' Guide to Glowing Up by Melissa Cummings-Quarry and Natalie A. Carter, illustrated by Dorcas Magbadelo (Bloomsbury); First Questions and Answers: What Is racism? by Katie Daynes and Jordan Akpojaro, illustrated by Sandhya Prabhat (Usborne); Kay's Marvellous Medicine by Adam Kay, illustrated by Henry Paker (Puffin); How to Grow Up and Feel Amazing! by Dr Ranj Singh, illustrated by David O'Connell (Wren & Rook, Hachette Children's Group)	Hey You! curated by Dapo Adeola (Puffin); The Christmas Pine by Julia Donaldson, illustrated by Victoria Sandøy (Alison Green Books, Scholastic); Supertato: Night of the Living Veg by Sue Hendra and Paul Linnet (Simon & Schuster Children's Books); Greg the Sausage Roll: Santa's Little Helper by Mark Hoyle and Roxanne Hoyle, illustrated by Gareth Conway (Puffin); Heartstopper: Volume Four written and illustrated by Alice Oseman (Hodder Children's Books); Peekaboo by Camilla Reid, illustrated Ingela P Arrhenius (Nosy Crow)
Discover Book of the Year	Non-fiction Audiobook of the Year	Fiction Audiobook of the Year
Keisha the Sket by Jade LB (#Merky Books, Cornerstone); Keeping the House by Tice Cin (And Other Stories); We Have a Dream by Mya-Rose Craig (Magic Cat Publishing); Nen and The Lonely Fisherman by Ian Eagleton (Owlet Press); Maybe I Don't Belong Here by David Harewood (Bluebird, Pan Macmillan); Detransition, Baby by Torrey Peters (Serpent's Tail)	Windswept and Interesting by Billy Connolly, Narrator: Billy Connolly (Two Roads); Know Your Rights and Claim Them: A Guide for Youth by Amnesty International with Angelina Jolie and Geraldine Van Bueren QC, Narrators: Angelina Jolie, Ariyon Bakare, Daisy Head, Homer Todiwala, Amanda Shodeko (Bolinda Audio); The Storyteller: Tales of Life and Music by Dave Grohl, Narrator: Dave Grohl (Simon & Schuster); How to Be a Rockstar by Shaun Ryder, Narrator: Shaun Ryder (W. F. Howes & Atlantic Books); Will by Will Smith, Narrator: Will Smith (Penguin Random House Audio); What Happened to You by Oprah Winfrey and Dr Bruce Perry, Narrators: Oprah Winfrey and Dr Bruce Perry (Bluebird, Pan Macmillan)	The Wizards of Once: Never and Forever by Cressida Cowell, Narrator: David Tennant (Hodder Children's Books); Careless by Kirsty Capes, Narrator: Amber Gadd (Orion Audio); The Sandman Act II by Neil Gaiman and Dirk Maggs, Narrators: Neil Gaiman, James McAvoy, Emma Corrin, Brian Cox, Kat Dennings, John Lithgow, Bill Nighy et al. (Audible); The Night She Disappeared by Lisa Jewell, Narrator: Joanne Froggatt (Penguin Random House Audio); The Man Who Died Twice by Richard Osman, Narrator: Lesley Manville (Penguin Random House Audio); The Lord of the Rings by J. R. R. Tolkien, Narrator: Andy Serkis (HarperFiction)

=== 2021 Books of the Year ===
The shortlisted nominees were announced on 19 March 2021. Once again the ceremony was held online due to the continuing restrictions surrounding the COVID-19 pandemic. It took place on 13 May 2021 at the Battersea Arts Centre, London.

This year saw the addition of a new award category: Page-turner of the Year.

Presented: 13 May 2021 – Online ceremony due to COVID-19.
Overall Book of the Year	Author of the Year	Illustrator of the year
Shuggie Bain by Douglas Stuart (Picador)	Richard Osman	Charlie Mackesy
Fiction Book of the Year	Debut Book of the Year	Crime and Thriller Book of the Year
Hamnet by Maggie O'Farrell (Tinder Press); The Vanishing Half by Brit Bennett (Dialogue Books); The Lying Life of Adults by Elena Ferrante, translated by Ann Goldstein (Europa Editions); The Evening and the Morning by Ken Follett (Macmillan); The Midnight Library by Matt Haig (Canongate Books); The Mirror & the Light by Hilary Mantel (Fourth Estate)	Shuggie Bain by Douglas Stuart (Picador); Ghosts by Dolly Alderton (Fig Tree, Penguin Random House); The Girl With the Louding Voice by Abi Daré (Sceptre); Exciting Times by Naoise Dolan (W&N); Rainbow Milk by Paul Mendez (Dialogue Books); Such A Fun Age by Kiley Reid (Bloomsbury Circus)	Troubled Blood by Robert Galbraith (Sphere Books); The Sentinel by Lee Child and Andrew Child (Transworld); The Patient Man by Joy Ellis (Joffe Books); The Guest List by Lucy Foley (HarperFiction); The Thursday Murder Club by Richard Osman (Viking Books); A Song for the Dark Times by Ian Rankin (Orion Fiction)
Non-fiction: Narrative Book of the Year	Non-fiction: Lifestyle Book of the Year	Page-turner of the Year
Diary of a Young Naturalist by Dara McAnulty (Little Toller Books); A Life on Our Planet by David Attenborough (Ebury Press); Tomorrow Will Be A Good Day by Captain Sir Tom Moore (Michael Joseph); A Promised Land by Barack Obama (Viking Books); Me and White Supremacy by Layla Saad (Quercus); Entangled Life by Merlin Sheldrake (Vintage Books)	Skincare: The Ultimate No-Nonsense Guide by Caroline Hirons (HQ); Nadiya Bakes by Nadiya Hussain (Michael Joseph); Think Like a Monk by Jay Shetty (Thorsons); Not a Diet Book by James Smith (HarperCollins); Five Minute Mum: Give Me Five by Daisy Upton (Penguin Random House Children's); What Mummy Makes: Cook just once for you and your baby by Rebecca Wilson (DK)	Where the Crawdads Sing by Delia Owen (Corsair); False Value by Ben Aaronovitch (Gollancz); Rag and Bone Christmas by Dilly Court (HarperFiction); All the Lonely People by Mike Gayle (Hodder & Stoughton); Darkdawn by Jay Kristoff (HarperVoyager); Just My Luck by Adele Parks (HQ)
Children's Fiction Book of the Year	Children's Illustrated and Non-fiction	Audiobook of the Year
The Highland Falcon Thief by M. G. Leonard and Sam Sedgman, illustrated by Elisa Paganelli (Macmillan Children's Books); The Danger Gang by Tom Fletcher, illustrated by Shane Devries (Puffin); Anisha, Accidental Detective by Serena Patel, illustrated by Emma McCann (Usborne); The Ickabog by J. K. Rowling (Little, Brown Books for Young Readers); Dragon Mountain by Katie Tsang and Kevin Tsang (Simon & Schuster Children's Books)	Black and British: A short, essential history by David Olusoga (Macmillan Children's Books); Draw with Rob by Rob Biddulph (HarperCollins Children's Books); I'm Sticking With You by Smriti Halls, illustrated by Steve Small (Simon & Schuster Children's Books); Kay's Anatomy by Adam Kay, illustrated by Henry Paker (Puffin); The Lost Spells by Robert Macfarlane and Jackie Morris (Hamish Hamilton); The Book of Hope by Katherine Rundell (Bloomsbury Children's Books)	Think Like a Monk by Jay Shetty, Narrator: by Jay Shetty (HarperCollins); Piranesi by Susanna Clarke, Narrator: Chiwetel Ejiofor (Bloomsbury); Troubled Blood by Robert Galbraith, Narrator: Robert Glenister (Hachette Audio); The Midnight Library by Matt Haig, Narrator: Carey Mulligan (Canongate Books); Grown Ups by Marian Keyes, Narrator: Marian Keyes (W. F. Howes); Greenlights by Matthew McConaughey, Narrator: Matthew McConaughey (Headline); A Promised Land by Barack Obama, Narrator: Barack Obama (Penguin Random House Audio); The Thursday Murder Club by Richard Osman, Narrator: Lesley Manville (Penguin Random House Audio); The Sandman by Neil Gaiman and Dirk Maggs, Narrators: Riz Ahmed, Kat Dennings, Taron Egerton, Neil Gaiman, James McAvoy, Samantha Morton, Bebe Neuwirth, Andy Serkis, Michael Sheen et al. (Audible)

=== 2020 Books of the Year ===
The shortlisted nominees were announced on 20 March 2020. Due to the COVID-19 pandemic, the live event due to be held on 18 May 2020 was cancelled and the ceremony was held online over a month later in June 2020. This year's ceremony was named Event of the Year at the 2020 Independent Publisher Awards.

In celebration of the Nibbies' 30th anniversary, 2020 saw a special award called "30 from 30" to celebrate the best of the best, where a longlist of 30 previous winners was narrowed down by a public poll to a shortlist of 10 nominees, plus a wildcard entry (This Is Going to Hurt by Adam Kay), that had not taken home a trophy in the past.

2020 was a notable year for the Nibbies in that except for illustrator Axel Scheffler, who won with his longtime co-creator Julia Donaldson, the programme's entire slate of authorial honours went to women and the Book of the Year and Author of the Year categories had their first ever black winners.

Presented: 29 June 2020 – Online ceremony due to COVID-19.
Overall Book of the Year	Author of the Year	Illustrator of the year
Queenie by Candice Carty-Williams (Trapeze)	Bernardine Evaristo	David McKee
Fiction Book of the Year	Debut Book of the Year	Crime and Thriller Book of the Year
Girl, Woman, Other by Bernardine Evaristo (Hamish Hamilton); The Testaments by Margaret Atwood (Chatto & Windus); The Secret Commonwealth by Philip Pullman (David Fickling Books and Penguin Random House); The Giver of Stars by Jojo Moyes (Michael Joseph); Lies, Lies, Lies by Adele Parks (HQ); Cilka's Journey by Heather Morris (Bonnier Books UK)	Queenie by Candice Carty-Williams (Trapeze); The Binding by Bridget Collins (The Borough Press); The Familiars by Stacey Halls (Bonnier Books UK); Fleishman Is in Trouble by Taffy Brodesser-Akner (Wildfire); Leonard and Hungry Paul by Ronan Hession (Bluemoose); The Confessions of Frannie Langton by Sara Collins (Viking)	My Sister the Serial Killer by Oyinkan Braithwaite (Atlantic Books); How the Dead Speak by Val McDermid (Little, Brown); The Hunting Party by Lucy Foley (HarperCollins); Imposter by LJ Ross (Dark Skies Publishing); The Silent Patient by Alex Michaelides (The Orion Publishing Group); Blue Moon by Lee Child (Transworld)
Non-fiction: Narrative Book of the Year	Non-fiction: Lifestyle Book of the Year	Children's Fiction Book of the Year
Three Women by Lisa Taddeo (Bloomsbury); Lady in Waiting: My Extraordinary Life in the Shadow of the Crown by Anne Glenconner (Hodder & Stoughton); Me by Elton John (Pan Macmillan); Twas the Nightshift Before Christmas by Adam Kay (Pan Macmillan); Invisible Women by Caroline Criado Perez (Vintage); The Body by Bill Bryson (Doubleday)	Pinch of Nom by Kate Allinson and Kay Featherstone (Pan Macmillan); Veg by Jamie Oliver (Michael Joseph); Hinch Yourself Happy by Sophie Hinchcliffe (Michael Joseph); Dishoom by Shamil Thakrar, Kavi Thakrar, Naved Nasir (Bloomsbury); The Book You Wish Your Parents Had Read by Philippa Perry (Penguin Random House); The Boy, the Mole, the Fox and the Horse by Charlie Mackesy (Ebury)	A Good Girl's Guide to Murder by Holly Jackson (Egmont); A Pinch of Magic by Michelle Harrison (Simon & Schuster); The 117-Storey Treehouse by Andy Griffiths and Terry Denton (Pan Macmillan); The Good Thieves by Katherine Rundell (Bloomsbury); The Star Outside My Window by Onjali Q. Rauf (Orion Children's Books)
Children's Illustrated and Non-fiction	Audiobook of the Year	30 from 30 Special Award
The Smeds and the Smoos by Julia Donaldson, illustrated by Axel Scheffler (Scholastic UK); You Got This by Bryony Gordon (Hachette Children's Group); Heartstopper: Volume 1 by Alice Oseman (Hachette Children's Group); On the Origin of Species by Sabina Radeva (Penguin Random House Children's); Prisoners of Geography by Tim Marshall, illustrated by Grace Easton and Jessica Smith (Elliott & Thompson and Simon & Schuster Children's UK); Look Up! By Nathan Bryon, illustrated by Dapo Adeola (Penguin Random House Children's)	The Testaments by Margaret Atwood (Penguin Random House); The Handmaid's Tale by Margaret Atwood. Narrators: Amy Landecker, Ann Dowd, Bradley Whitford, Elisabeth Moss (Penguin Random House); Gotta Get Theroux This by Louis Theroux. Narrator: Louis Theroux (Macmillan); The Body by Bill Bryson. Narrator: Bill Bryson (Audible); My Sister, the Serial Killer by Oyinkan Braithwaite. Narrator: Weruche Opia (W.F. Howes); The Madness of Crowds by Douglas Murray. Narrator: Douglas Murray (Bloomsbury); The Beekeeper of Aleppo by Christy Lefteri. Narrator: Art Malik (Bonnier Books UK); The Secret Commonwealth by Philip Pullman. Narrator: Michael Sheen (Penguin Random House)	Harry Potter and the Philosopher's Stone by J. K. Rowling (Bloomsbury) – 1998; Northern Lights, Philip Pullman (Scholastic) – 1997; Bridget Jones's Diary, Helen Fielding (Picador) – 1998; White Teeth, Zadie Smith (Penguin) – 2001; The Curious Incident of the Dog in the Night Time, Mark Haddon (David Fickling) – 2004; The Lovely Bones, Alice Sebold (Picador) – 2004; The Girl with the Dragon Tattoo, Stieg Larsson (Quercus) – 2009; One Day, David Nicholls (Hodder) – 2010; Eleanor Oliphant Is Completely Fine, Gail Honeyman (HarperFiction) – 2018; Normal People, Sally Rooney (Faber and Faber) – 2019; This Is Going to Hurt by Adam Kay (Picador) – wildcard entry

=== 2019 Books of the Year ===
The shortlisted nominees were announced on 22 March 2019. The awards were now simplified into just two divisions, Books of the Year (the Nibbies) and The Trade Awards.

2019 saw the Children's Book of the Year category split into two categories: Children's Fiction Book of the Year and Children's Illustrated and Non-fiction Book of the Year. This year also saw Becoming, the memoir by former first lady Michelle Obama winning two awards.

Presented: 13 May 2019 – Venue: Grosvenor House Hotel, London.
Overall Book of the Year	Author of the Year	Illustrator of the year
Normal People by Sally Rooney (Faber and Faber)	Lee Child	Judith Kerr
Fiction Book of the Year	Debut Book of the Year	Crime and Thriller Book of the Year
Normal People by Sally Rooney (Faber and Faber); Transcription by Kate Atkinson (Doubleday); Milkman by Anna Burns (Faber and Faber); Still Me by Jojo Moyes (Michael Joseph); Tombland by C. J. Sansom (Mantle); Why Mummy Swears by Gill Sims (HarperFiction)	Lullaby by Leila Slimani (Faber and Faber); The Mermaid and Mrs Hancock by Imogen Hermes Gowar (Harvill Secker); Never Greener by Ruth Jones (Bantam Press); The Tattooist of Auschwitz by Heather Morris (Zaffre); Dear Mrs Bird by A. J. Pearce (Picador); The Seven Deaths of Evelyn Hardcastle by Stuart Turton (Raven Books)	Our House by Louise Candlish (Simon & Schuster); The Woman in the Window by A. J. Finn (HarperFiction); The Wife Between Us by Greer Hendricks & Sarah Pekkanen (Pan); Close to Home by Cara Hunter (Viking/Penguin Paperbacks); Macbeth by Jo Nesbo (Hogarth); In a House of Lies by Ian Rankin (Orion)
Non-fiction: Narrative Book of the Year	Non-fiction: Lifestyle Book of the Year	Children's Fiction Book of the Year
Becoming by Michelle Obama (Viking); Everything I Know About Love by Dolly Alderton (Fig Tree); First Man In: Leading from the Front by Ant Middleton (HarperNonFiction); The Secret Barrister by The Secret Barrister (Picador); The Language of Kindness: A Nurse's Story by Christie Watson (Chatto & Windus); Fire and Fury: Inside the Trump White House by Michael Wolff (Little, Brown)	BOSH! by Henry Firth and Ian Theasby (HQ); Slay in Your Lane: The Black Girl Bible by Yomi Adegoke and Elizabeth Uviebinene (Fourth Estate); Feminists Don't Wear Pink (and Other Lies) by curated by Scarlett Curtis (Penguin); Lose Weight for Good by Tom Kerridge (Absolute Press); Ottolenghi Simple by Yotam Ottolenghi and Tara Wigley (Ebury Press); The Ordnance Survey Puzzle Book by Ordnance Survey (Trapeze)	WINNER RETRACTED (HarperCollins Children's Books); Children of Blood and Bone by Tomi Adeyemi (Macmillan Children's Books); The House with Chicken Legs by Sophie Anderson (Usborne); Head Kid by David Baddiel (HarperCollins Children's Books); The Skylarks' War by Hilary McKay (MacMillan Children's Books); My Mum Tracy Beaker by Jacqueline Wilson (Doubleday)
Children's Illustrated and Non-fiction	Audiobook of the Year	
You Are Awesome by Matthew Syed, illustrated by Toby Triumph (Wren & Rook); Stories for Boys Who Dare to Be Different by Ben Brooks, illustrated by Quinton Winter (Quercus); Politics for Beginners by Alex Frith, Rosie Hore, Louie Stowell, illustrated by Kellan Stover (Usborne); Oi Duck Billed Platypus! by Kes Grey and Jim Field, illustrated by Jim Field (Hodder Children's Books); Fantastically Great Women Who Made History by Kate Pankhurst (Bloomsbury Children's Books); I Am the Seed That Grew The Tree: A Nature Poem for Every Day of the Year by Fiona Waters, illustrated by Frann Preston-Gannon (Nosy Crow)	Becoming by Michelle Obama. Narrator: Michelle Obama (Penguin); Milkman by Anna Burns. Narrator: Brid Brennan (Faber and Faber); Their Lost Daughters by Joy Ellis. Narrator: Richard Armitage (Audible Studios); Lethal White by Robert Galbraith. Narrator: Robert Glenister (Hachette Audio); Brief Answers to the Big Questions by Stephen Hawking. Narrator: Ben Wishaw (John Murray); First Man In: Leading from the Front by Ant Middleton. Narrator: Ant Middleton (HarperNonFiction)	

=== 2018 Books of the Year ===
The shortlisted nominees were announced on 16 March 2018. Again the awards comprised four divisions: Books of the Year (the Nibbies), Great People, Bringing Books to Readers and Publishing Success.

New categories of Author of the Year, Illustrator of the Year were added this year. Audiobook of the Year and an award for Overall Book of the Year from all the category winners were also reintroduced after being omitted in 2017. This year also saw a joint winner for the Children's Book of the Year category.

Presented: 14 May 2018 – Venue: Grosvenor House Hotel, London.
Overall Book of the Year	Author of the Year	Illustrator of the year
Eleanor Oliphant Is Completely Fine by Gail Honeyman (Harper Fiction)	Philip Pullman	Axel Scheffler
Fiction Book of the Year	Debut Book of the Year	Crime and Thriller Book of the Year
Reservoir 13 by Jon McGregor (Fourth Estate); The Break by Marian Keyes (Michael Joseph); Birdcage Walk by Helen Dunmore (Hutchinson/Windmill); Winter by Ali Smith (Hamish Hamilton); How to Stop Time by Matt Haig (Canongate); City of Friends by Joanna Trollope (Mantle)	Eleanor Oliphant Is Completely Fine by Gail Honeyman (Harper Fiction); Homegoing by Yaa Gyasi (Viking); Sirens by Joseph Knox (Doubleday); Conversations with Friends by Sally Rooney (Faber and Faber); Why Mummy Drinks by Gill Sims (HarperCollins); My Absolute Darling by Gabriel Tallent (HarperCollins)	The Dry by Jane Harper (Abacus); The Midnight Line by Lee Child (Bantam Press); The Girl Before by J.P. Delaney (Quercus); Spook Street by Mick Herron (John Murray); He Said/She Said by Erin Kelly (Mulholland); Behind Her Eyes by Sarah Pinborough (HarperCollins)
Non-fiction: Narrative Book of the Year	Non-fiction: Lifestyle Book of the Year	Children's Book of the Year
Why I'm No Longer Talking to White People About Race by Reni Eddo-Lodge (Bloomsbury Circus); What Does This Button Do? By Bruce Dickinson (Harper Non-Fiction); This Is Going to Hurt: Secret Diaries of a Junior Doctor by Adam Kay (Picador); I AM, I AM, I AM: Seventeen Brushes with Death by Maggie O'Farrell (Tinder Press); Ask an Astronaut: My Guide to Life in Space by Tim Peake (Century); The Secret Life of Cows by Rosamund Young (Faber and Faber)	5 Ingredients by Jamie Oliver (Michael Joseph); Recovery: Freedom from Our Addictions by Russell Brand (Bluebird); Happy: Finding Joy in Every Day and Letting Go of Perfect by Fearne Cotton (Orion Spring); The Christmas Chronicles: Notes, Stories & 100 Essential Recipes for Midwinter by Nigel Slater (HarperCollins); The Things You Can See Only When You Slow Down: How to Be Calm in a Busy World by Haemin Sunim (Penguin Life); Cooking for Family and Friends by Joe Wicks (Bluebird)	The Hate U Give by Angie Thomas (Walker Books); The Lost Words by Robert Macfarlane, illustrated by Jackie Morris (Penguin Random House Children's); Good Night Stories for Rebel Girls by Elena Favilli and Francesca Cavallo (Particular Books); Oi Cat! by Kes Gray, illustrated by Jim Field (Hodder Children's Books); La Belle Sauvage: the Book of Dust Volume One by Philip Pullman, illustrated by Chris Wormell (David Fickling books in association with Penguin Random House Children's)
Audiobook of the Year		
La Belle Sauvage: The Book of Dust Volume One by Philip Pullman. Narrator: Michael Sheen (Penguin Random House UK Audio); Sherlock Holmes: The Definitive Collection by Arthur Conan Doyle. Narrator: Stephen Fry (Audible); The Girl Before by J. P. Delaney. Narrators: Emilia Fox, Finty Williams, Lise Aagaard Knudsen (Quercus); Eleanor Oliphant Is Completely Fine by Gail Honeyman. Narrator: Cathleen McCarron (HarperCollins); Kid Normal by Greg James and Chris Smith. Narrators: Greg James and Chris Smith (W. F. Howes/Nudged Audiobooks); How Not To Be a Boy by Robert Webb. Narrator: Robert Webb (Audible Studio)		

=== 2017 Books of the Year ===
The shortlisted nominees were announced on 15 March 2017 at the London Book Fair. The awards comprised four divisions: Books of the Year (the Nibbies), Great People, Bringing Books to Readers and Publishing Success. For the first Nibbies since 2014, the ceremony was expanded, Crime and Thriller titles regained their own category (previously called the Crime Thriller of the Year and changed to Thriller and Crime Novel of the Year in 2011), while non-fiction was split into Narrative and Lifestyle. The Newcomer of the Year / New Writer of the Year award was renamed Debut Book of the Year and The Popular Fiction award which had changed to Popular Fiction Book of the Year in 2010 was renamed simply as Fiction Book of the Year in this year.

Presented: 8 May 2017 – Venue: Grosvenor House Hotel, London.
Fiction Book of the Year	Debut Book of the Year	Crime and Thriller Book of the Year
The Essex Serpent by Sarah Perry (Serpent's Tail); Days Without End by Sebastian Barry (Faber & Faber); The Sellout by Paul Beatty (Oneworld); The Muse by Jessie Burton (Picador); Cartes Postales from Greece by Victoria Hislop (Headline Review); This Must Be the Place by Maggie O'Farrell (Headline)	What Belongs to You by Garth Greenwell (Picador); The Trouble with Goats and Sheep by Joanna Cannon (Borough Press); The Girls by Emma Cline (Chatto & Windus); My Name Is Leon by Kit de Waal (Penguin); Five Rivers Met on a Wooded Plain by Barney Norris (Doubleday); Golden Hill by Francis Spufford (Faber)	Dodgers by Bill Beverley (No Exit Press); The Widow by Fiona Barton (Bantam Press); Night School by Lee Child (Bantam Press); Lie with Me by Sabine Durrant (Mulholland Books); Conclave by Robert Harris (Hutchinson); I See You by Clare Mackintosh (Little, Brown)
Non-fiction: Narrative Book of the Year	Non-fiction: Lifestyle Book of the Year	Children's Book of the Year
East West Street by Philippe Sands (W&N); Mad Girl by Bryony Gordon (Headline); When Breath Becomes Air by Paul Kalanithi (The Bodley Head); The Outrun by Amy Liptrot (Canongate); The Good Immigrant, ed by Nikesh Shukla (Unbound); Born to Run by Bruce Springsteen (S&S)	Hello, Is this Planet Earth? By Tim Peake (Century); Sidemen: The Book by The Sidemen (Coronet); The Unmumsy Mum by Sarah Turner (Bantam Press); Five on Brexit Island by Bruno Vincent (Quercus); Lean in 15: The Sustain Plan by Joe Wicks (Bluebird); The Little Book of Hygge by Meik Wiking (Penguin Life)	The Girl of Ink and Stars by Kiran Millwood Hargreave (Chicken House); The Christmasaurus by Tom Fletcher, illustrated by Shane Devries (Puffin); Oi Dog! Kes Gray, Claire Gray, illustrated by Jim Field (Hodder); Nadiya's Bake Me a Story by Nadiya Hussain, illustrated by Clair Rossiter (Hodder); Harry Potter and the Cursed Child by J. K. Rowling, John Tiffany and Jack Thorne (Little, Brown and Pottermore)
Bestseller of the Year
Harry Potter and the Cursed Child by J. K. Rowling

== 1990–2016 ==
=== Book of the Year ===
Prior to 2010 the Best was a unique winner. Starting in 2010, the Best was chosen by the public via open internet vote from among the winning books in the other categories. The category was resurrected in 2018.

Year	Author	Title	Publisher	Ref.
1994	Jung Chang	Wild Swans	Flamingo	
1995	Alan Bennett	Writing Home	Faber & Faber	
1996	Delia Smith	Delia Smith's Winter Collection	BBC Books	
1997	Dava Sobel	Longitude	Fourth Estate	
1998	Helen Fielding	Bridget Jones's Diary	Picador	
1999	Ted Hughes	Birthday Letters	Faber & Faber	
2000	Alex Ferguson	Managing My Life	Hodder & Stoughton	
2001	Tony Parsons	Man and Boy	HarperCollins	
2002	Pamela Stephenson	Billy	HarperCollins	
2003	Michael Moore	Stupid White Men	Penguin	
2004	Lynne Truss	Eats, Shoots & Leaves	Profile	
2005	Dan Brown	The Da Vinci Code	Corgi	
2006	J. K. Rowling	Harry Potter and the Half-Blood Prince	Bloomsbury	
2007	Con and Hal Iggulden	The Dangerous Book for Boys	HarperCollins	
2008	Ian McEwan	On Chesil Beach	Jonathan Cape	
2009	Kate Summerscale	The Suspicions of Mr Whicher	Bloomsbury	
2010	David Nicholls	One Day	Hodder & Stoughton	
2011	Caitlin Moran	How to Be a Woman	Ebury Press	
2012	EL James	Fifty Shades of Grey	Vintage Books	
2013	Neil Gaiman	The Ocean at the End of the Lane	William Morrow and Company	
2014	Jessie Burton	The Miniaturist	Ecco (US); Picador (UK)	
2015	No award			
2016	No award			

=== Children's Book of the Year ===
Previously called British Children's Book of the Year. Renamed to Children's Book of the Year in 2010.

Year	Author	Title	Publisher	Ref.
1996	Alison Sage ed.	The Hutchinson Treasury of Children's Literature	Hutchinson	
1997	Philip Pullman	Northern Lights	Scholastic	
1998	J. K. Rowling	Harry Potter and the Philosopher's Stone	Bloomsbury	
1999	J. K. Rowling	Harry Potter and the Chamber of Secrets	Bloomsbury	
2000	Jacqueline Wilson	The Illustrated Mum	Doubleday	
2001	Philip Pullman	The Amber Spyglass	Scholastic	
2002	Eoin Colfer	Artemis Fowl	Viking/Puffin	
2003	Jacqueline Wilson	Girls in Tears	Corgi Children's	
2004	Mark Haddon	The Curious Incident of the Dog in the Night-Time	David Fickling	
2005	Julia Donaldson and Axel Scheffler	The Gruffalo's Child	Macmillan Children's Books	
2006	Anthony Horowitz	Ark Angel	Walker Books	
2007	Ricky Gervais	Flanimals of the Deep	Faber & Faber	
2008	Francesca Simon	Horrid Henry and the Abominable Snowman	Orion Children's Books	
2009	Stephenie Meyer	Breaking Dawn	Little, Brown	
2010	Julia Donaldson and Axel Scheffler	Zog	Alison Green	
2011	Patrick Ness	A Monster Calls	Walker Books	
2012	David Walliams	Ratburger	HarperCollins	
2013	David Walliams	Demon Dentist	HarperCollins	
2014	David Walliams	Awful Auntie	HarperCollins	
2015	No award			
2016	No award			

=== Fiction Book of the Year ===
Previously called Popular Fiction Award. Name changed to Popular Fiction Book of the Year in 2010 and subsequently to Fiction Book of the Year in 2017.

- 2016 – (no award)
- 2015 – (no award)
- 2014 – The Shock of the Fall – Nathan Filer
- 2013 – An Officer and a Spy – Robert Harris
- 2012 – Fifty Shades of Grey – E. L. James
- 2011 – A Tiny Bit Marvellous – Dawn French
- 2010 – One Day – David Nicholls
- 2009 – Devil May Care – Sebastian Faulks (Penguin)
- 2008 – The Memory Keeper's Daughter – Kim Edwards (Penguin)
- 2006 – Anybody Out There? – Marian Keyes (Michael Joseph)
- 2006 – The Time Traveler's Wife – Audrey Niffenegger (Vintage)

=== Début Book of the Year ===
Previously called the Newcomer of the Year. Name changed to New Writer of the Year in 2010 and subsequently to Début Book of the Year in 2017.

- 2016 – (no award)
- 2015 – (no award)
- 2014 – The Miniaturist by Jessie Burton
- 2013 – Tigers in Red Weather by Liza Klaussman
- 2012 – The Unlikely Pilgrimage of Harold Fry by Rachel Joyce
- 2011 – When God Was a Rabbit by Sarah Winman
- 2010 – The Hare with Amber Eyes by Edmund de Waal
- 2009 – Child 44 by Tom Rob Smith
- 2008 – Catherine O'Flynn –
- 2007 – Victoria Hislop –
- 2006 – Marina Lewycka –
- 2005 – Susanna Clarke –
- 2004 – Brick Lane by Monica Ali
- 2003 – Allison Pearson
- 2002 – Pete McCarthy
- 2001 – White Teeth by Zadie Smith
- 2000 – Driving Over Lemons: An Optimist in Andalucia by Chris Stewart
- 1999 – Borders –
- 1998 – Daisy & Tom –
- 1997 – Kate Atkinson –
- 1990 – The Power of One by Bryce Courtenay

=== Crime & Thriller Book of the Year ===
Previously called the Crime Thriller of the Year. Name changed to Thriller & Crime Novel of the Year in 2011 and subsequently to Crime & Thriller Book of the Year in 2017.

- 2016 – (no award)
- 2015 – (no award)
- 2014 – I Am Pilgrim – Terry Hayes
- 2013 – The Carrier – Sophie Hannah (Hodder)
- 2012 – A Wanted Man – Lee Child
- 2011 – Before I Go to Sleep – S. J. Watson
- 2010 – (no award)
- 2009 – The Girl with the Dragon Tattoo – Stieg Larsson
- 2008 – Book of the Dead – Patricia Cornwell (Little, Brown)
- 2007 – The Naming of the Dead – Ian Rankin (Orion)
- 2006 – The Take – Martina Cole (Headline)
- 2005 – Fleshmarket Close – Ian Rankin (Orion)

=== Illustrated Children's Book of the Year ===
Resurrected as a standalone category in 2022.

- 1995 – The Most Amazing Pop-Up Science Book – Jay Young (Watts Books)
- 1994 – Mummy Laid an Egg – Babette Cole (Jonathan Cape)
- 1993 – Penguin Small – Mick Inkpen (Hodder)
- 1992 – Farmer Duck – Helen Oxenbury (Walker Books)
- 1991 – The Mousehole Cat – Nicola Bayley (Walker Books)

== Retired awards ==
The following awards are no longer active or have been split into sub categories.

=== Audiobook of the Year ===
- 2014 – Awful Auntie – David Walliams
- 2013 – The Ocean at the End of the Lane – written and narrated by Neil Gaiman (Headline)
- 2012 – The Woman Who Went to Bed for a Year – Sue Townsend, narrated by Caroline Quentin
- 2011 – My Dear, I Wanted to Tell You – Louisa Young, narrated by Dan Stevens
- 2005–2010 – (no award)
- 2004 – Forgotten Voices of the Great War – Max Arthur (Random House)
- 2003 – A Series of Unfortunate Events – written by Lemony Snicket, narrated by Tim Curry (Collins)
- 2002 – The Laying on of Hands – written and narrated by Alan Bennett (BBC Radio Collection)

=== Bestseller Award ===
Named Bestseller of the Year in 1991. Renamed Bestseller Award in 2017.

- 2017 – Harry Potter and the Cursed Child – J. K. Rowling
- 1992–2016 – (no award)
- 1991 – Delia Smith's Christmas – Delia Smith (BBC Books)

=== Biography/Autobiography of the Year ===
Previously called Biography of the Year. Name changed to Biography/Autobiography of the Year in 2010.

- 2014 – Please, Mister Postman – Alan Johnson
- 2013 – David Jason: My Life – David Jason (Random House)
- 2012 – My Animals and Other Family – Clare Balding
- 2011 – Charles Dickens – Claire Tomalin
- 2010 – The Fry Chronicles – Stephen Fry
- 2009 – Dreams from My Father – Barack Obama (Canongate)
- 2008 – My Booky Wook – Russell Brand (Hodder & Stoughton)
- 2007 – The Sound of Laughter – Peter Kay (Century)
- 2006 – Sharon Osbourne Extreme – Sharon Osbourne (Time Warner)
- 2005 – My Life – Bill Clinton (Hutchinson)
- 2004 – Toast – Nigel Slater (Fourth Estate)
- 2003 – Churchill: A Biography – Roy Jenkins (Pan)

=== Popular Non-Fiction Book of the Year ===
- 2014 – Love, Nina – Nina Stibbe
- 2013 – I Am Malala – Malala Yousafzai and Christina Lamb
- 2012 – Is It Just Me – Miranda Hart
- 2011 – How To Be a Woman – Caitlin Moran
- 2010 – The Making of Modern Britain – Andrew Marr

=== Food & Drink Book of the Year ===
- 2014 – Plenty More – Yotam Ottolenghi
- 2013 – Eat – Nigel Slater (HarperCollins)
- 2012 – The Hairy Dieters – Si King and Dave Myers
- 2011 – The Good Cook – Simon Hopkinson
- 2010 – Plenty – Yotam Ottolenghi

=== Paperback of the Year ===
- 2011 – Room – Emma Donoghue

=== Outstanding Achievement ===
Previously called the Lifetime Achievement Award (1993–2009). Renamed to Outstanding Achievement Award in 2010.

- 2014 – Mary Berry
- 2013 – (no award)
- 2012 – Ian Rankin
- 2011 – Jackie Collins
- 2010 – Martin Amis and Terry Pratchett
- 2009 – (no award)
- 2008 – J. K. Rowling
- 2007 – John Grisham
- 2006 – Jamie Oliver
- 2005 – Sir John Mortimer
- 2004 – Sir David Attenborough
- 2003 – Alan Bennett
- 2002 – Mark Barty-King
- 2001 – Ernest Hecht
- 2000 – Spike Milligan
- 1999 – Maeve Binchy
- 1998 – Jilly Cooper
- 1997 – Paul Scherer
- 1996 – Wilbur Smith
- 1995 – Delia Smith
- 1994 – Catherine Cookson
- 1993 – Dr. D. G. Hessayon

=== UK Author of the Year ===
Previously called Author of the Year. Renamed to UK Author of the Year in 2010, notwithstanding the fact the award has been given to non-UK authors.

- 2014 – David Nicholls – Us
- 2013 – Kate Atkinson – Life After Life
- 2012 – Hilary Mantel – Bring Up the Bodies
- 2011 – Alan Hollinghurst – The Stranger's Child
- 2010 – Hilary Mantel – Wolf Hall
- 2009 – Aravind Adiga
- 2008 – Ian McEwan
- 2007 – Richard Dawkins
- 2006 – Alan Bennett
- 2005 – Sheila Hancock
- 2004 – Alexander McCall Smith
- 2003 – Sarah Waters
- 2002 – Philip Pullman
- 2001 – Nigella Lawson
- 2000 – J. K. Rowling
- 1999 – Beryl Bainbridge
- 1998 – Louis de Bernières
- 1997 – Bill Bryson
- 1996 – Salman Rushdie
- 1995 – Sebastian Faulks
- 1994 – Roddy Doyle
- 1993 – Andrew Morton
- 1992 – Peter Mayle
- 1991 – Peter Ackroyd
- 1990 – Prince of Wales

=== International Author of the Year ===
- 2014 – We Are All Completely Beside Ourselves – Karen Joy Fowler
- 2013 – Gone Girl – Gillian Flynn
- 2012 – The Snow Child – Eowyn Ivey
- 2011 – A Visit from the Goon Squad – Jennifer Egan
- 2010 – Freedom – Jonathan Franzen

=== Richard & Judy Best Read of the Year ===
- 2009 – When Will There Be Good News? – Kate Atkinson (Doubleday)
- 2008 – A Thousand Splendid Suns – Khaled Hosseini (Bloomsbury)
- 2007 – The Interpretation of Murder – Jed Rubenfeld (Headline Review)
- 2006 – Labyrinth – Kate Mosse (Orion)
- 2005 – Cloud Atlas – David Mitchell (Sceptre)
- 2004 – The Lovely Bones – Alice Sebold (Picador)

=== The Children's Author of the Year ===
- 1995 – Allan Ahlberg and Janet Ahlberg
- 1994 – Anne Fine
- 1993 – Raymond Briggs
- 1992 – Dick King-Smith
- 1991 – Anne Fine
- 1990 – Roald Dahl

=== Illustrated Book of the Year ===
- 2004 – England's Thousand Best Houses – Simon Jenkins (Allen Lane)
- 2003 – Sahara – Michael Palin (Weidenfeld Nicolson Illustrated)
- 2002 – The Blue Planet – Andrew Byatt, Alastair Fothergill, Martha Holmes (BBC Worldwide)
- 2001 – The Beatles Anthology (Cassell)
- 2000 – Century – Bruce Bernard (Phaidon Press)
- 1999 – Ethel & Ernest – Raymond Briggs (Jonathan Cape)
- 1998 – The Lost Gardens of Heligan – Tim Smit (Gollancz)
- 1997 – Flora Britannica – Richard Mabey (Sinclair-Stevenson)
- 1996 – The River Cafe Cookbook – Rose Gray and Ruth Rogers (Ebury Press)
- 1995 – The Art Book (Phaidon Press)

=== The TV and Film Book of the Year ===
- 2007 – The Devil Wears Prada – Lauren Weisberger (HarperCollins)
- 2006 – The Constant Gardener – John le Carré (Hodder & Stoughton)
- 2005 – Himalaya – Michael Palin (Weidenfeld & Nicolson)
- 2004 – How Clean Is Your House? – Kim Woodburn and Aggie MacKenzie (Michael Joseph)
- 2003 – What Not to Wear – Trinny Woodall and Susannah Constantine (Weidenfeld & Nicolson)

=== The Literary Fiction Award ===
- 2005 – Cloud Atlas – David Mitchell (Sceptre)
- 2004 – The Curious Incident of the Dog in the Night-Time – Mark Haddon (Jonathan Cape)

=== The History Book of the Year ===
- 2005 – William Pitt the Younger: A Biography – William Hague (HarperCollins)
- 2004 – Stalin: The Court of the Red Tsar – Simon Sebag Montefiore (Weidenfeld & Nicolson)

=== The Sports Book of the Year ===
- 2007 – Gerrard: My Autobiography – Steven Gerrard (Bantam)
- 2006 – Being Freddie – Andrew Flintoff (Hodder & Stoughton)
- 2005 – Gazza: My Story – Paul Gascoigne (Headline)
- 2004 – Martin Johnson: The Autobiography – Martin Johnson (Headline)

=== The deciBel Writer of the Year ===
- 2007 – Jackie Kay
- 2006 – Diana Evans
- 2005 – Hari Kunzru

=== The Fastest Selling Biography of All Time ===
- 2004 – My Side – David Beckham (CollinsWillow)

=== The Travel Writer of the Year ===
- 1993 – Michael Palin – Pole to Pole (BBC Books)
- 1992 – Mark Shand – Travels on My Elephant (Jonathan Cape)
- 1991 – V. S. Naipaul – India (Heinemann)
- 1990 – Peter Mayle – A Year in Provence (Hamish Hamilton)

=== The Fantasy and Science Fiction Author of the Year ===
- 1994 – Terry Pratchett

== See also ==
- List of British literary awards
- List of literary awards
- English literature
- British literature
