= Hirons =

Hirons is a surname. Notable people with the surname include:

- Caroline Hirons, British beauty and skincare specialist and writer
- Frederic Charles Hirons (1882–1942), American architect
- John Hirons (1876–after 1905), British footballer
- William Hirons (1871–1958), British tug of war competitor

== See also ==
- Meanings of minor planet names: 2001–3000#356
