= Get Reading festival =

Children's reading event in England

The Get Reading Festival is an annual children's reading event hosted by the London Evening Standard and Nook.

== History ==
The festival started in the summer of 2011, and was sparked by Aurella Brzezowska, a seven-year-old girl who had no books at her house. Instead, she was taught to read by a reading volunteer.

The 2011 Get Reading festival raised £1,000,000, which supported four years worth of funding for the charity 'Beanstalk'.

Before the actual 2013 festival, there were special readings by celebrities around London, such as Harry Enfield, Boris Johnson, and other high-profile figures reading extracts from books such as Harry Potter and the Philosopher's Stone (J.K.Rowling), George's Marvellous Medicine (Roald Dahl), and others.

== 2013 festival ==
The 2013 event took place on 13 July. There were over 30 readings live at the free event, with some celebrities such as Rupert Everett and Hugh Grant. The event was hosted by the Dick & Dom. The festival was also backed by the Pakistani education activist Malala Yousafzai, the Mayor of London, Boris Johnson, Princess Beatrice, and Stephen Fry.

Readers
Rupert Everett
Hugh Grant
Malala Yousafzai
Peppa Pig
Evgeny Lebedev
Barbara Windsor
Lily Cole
David Harewood
Anthony Horowitz
Warwick Davis
Malorie Blackman
Sam West
Nicholas Briggs
Babette Cole
Steve Cole
Anne Fine

=== Other events ===
In 2013, there was also a performance of Billy Elliot the Musical, Wicked, Matilda the Musical, Horrible Histories performing Barmy Britain, and We're Going on a Bear Hunt.

The National Gallery also brought reproductions of three paintings: Bacchus and Ariadne (Titian), Saint George and the Dragon (Paolo Uccello), and An Experiment on a Bird in the Air Pump (Joseph Wright). A National Gallery spokesman said that they brought the paintings in an attempt to "engage young audiences" and help them "enjoy our collection".
