= Hannah Grace (author) =

English novelist (born 1990s)

- Born: 1992 or 1993 (age 32–33)
- Occupation: Novelist
- Writing career
- Genre: Romance
- Website: hannahgrace.co.uk

Hannah Grace (born 1992/1993) is an English romance novelist. She began her career with her bestselling Maple Hills series, starting with her debut novel Icebreaker (2022).

== Career ==
Grace self-published her debut sports romance novel Icebreaker in August 2022. The novel is set in a fictional Californian university. After Icebreaker became popular on the Kindle Unlimited service, it was acquired later that year for traditional publishing by Atria Publishing Group in early 2023. Icebreaker was a Bookscan (UK) bestseller and entered the The New York Times bestseller list in the Paperback Trade Fiction category at the end of February 2023 and spent many weeks on the list, at various points reaching #1. Icebreaker was shortlisted for Pageturner of the Year at the British Book Awards and received a 2026 Nielsen Silver Bestseller Award.

This was followed by Grace's second novel Wildfire, set in the same universe but at a summer camp, in October 2023. Wildfire debuted and spent three consecutive weeks at #1 on The New York Times Paperback Trade Fiction bestseller list. and reached second place on the Combined Print & E-Book Fiction list. A third installment Daydream was published in September 2024. A third installment Daydream was published in September 2024. Daydream debuted at #1 on the Official UK Top 50, The New York Times Paperback Trade Fiction and Combined Print & E-Book Fiction bestseller lists, and the Publishers Weekly list. Daydream was shortlisted for Pageturner of the Year at the British Book Awards.

In 2025, Grace signed a five-book deal with Piatkus Books (a Little, Brown Book Group imprint, through which she published a standalone romance novel Holiday Ever After that year. Grace will next pen a Formula 1 romance series, starting with Champagne Problems in 2027.

== Adaptations ==
In June 2026, Netflix commissioned a television adaptation of Icebreaker from Unwell Productions with Amanda Lasher as showrunner. Daisy Jelley and Connor Simos are attached to star in the series.

== Personal life ==
Grace lives in Manchester, England with her husband and two dogs. The name Hannah Grace is a pen name, and she limits her public presence.

== Works ==
=== Maple Hills universe ===
- Icebreaker (2022)
- Wildfire (2023)
- Daydream (2024)

==== In the Paddock series ====
- Champagne Problems (2027)

=== Standalones ===
- Holiday Ever After (2025)
