= Louise Candlish =

British author

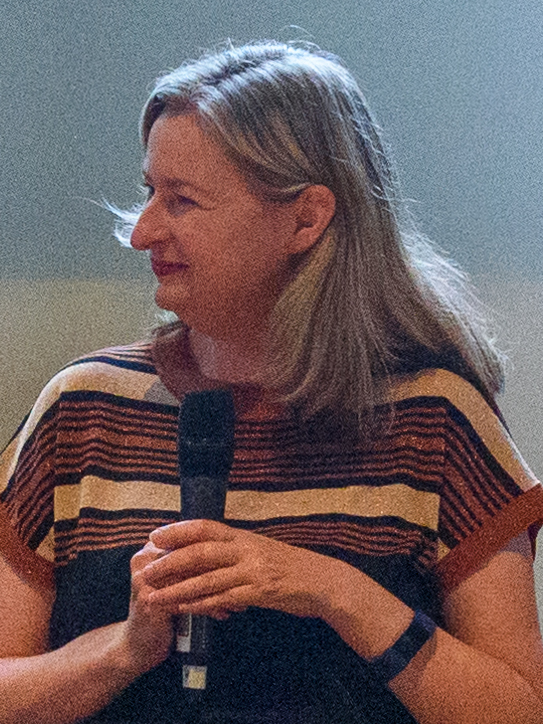
- Candlish in 2021
- Born: Hexham, Northumberland, England
- Education: University College London
- Occupation: Author
- Notable work: Our House (2018); The Only Suspect (2023)
- Awards: Crime & Thriller Book of the Year at British Book Awards
- Website: www.louisecandlish.com

Louise Candlish is a British author. In 2019, her crime novel Our House won the Crime & Thriller Book of the Year award at the British Book Awards. In 2021, the novel was adapted into an ITV drama starring Tuppence Middleton and Martin Compston.

In 2024, her book The Only Suspect won the Capital Crime Fingerprint award for thriller of the year.

== Early life ==
Candlish was born in Hexham, Northumberland, and grew up in Northampton. She graduated with a Bachelor of Arts (BA) in English from University College London (UCL) in 1989.

== Published books ==
Novels

- A Neighbours Guide to Murder (2025)
- Our Holiday (2024)
- The Only Suspect (2023)
- The Heights (2021)
- The Other Passenger (2020)
- Those People (2019)
- Our House (2018)
- The Swimming Pool (2016)
- The Sudden Departure of the Frasers (2015)
- The Disappearance of Emily Marr (2013)
- The Day You Saved My Life (2012)
- Other People's Secrets (2010)
- Before We Say Goodbye (2009)
- The Second Husband (2008)
- Since I Don't Have You (2007)
- The Double Life Of Anna Day (2006)
- I'll Be There For You (2005)
- The Island Hideaway (2004)

Novellas

- The Skylight (2021)

== Awards ==
- 2025 Theakston Old Peculier Crime Novel of the Year 2025 (longlisted): Our Holiday
- 2025 New York Festivals Awards Audiobook - Ensemble (shortlisted): Our Holiday
- 2024 Ned Kelly Award Best International Crime Fiction (winner): The Only Suspect
- 2024 Capital Crime Fingerprint Award Thriller of the Year (winner): The Only Suspect
- 2024 CWA Dagger in the Library Award (shortlisted)
- 2021 Theakston Old Peculier Crime Novel of the Year Award (longlisted): The Other Passenger
- 2019 British Book Awards Crime & Thriller Book of the Year (winner): Our House
- 2019 Theakston Old Peculier Crime Novel of the Year Award (longlisted): Our House
- 2019 Glass Bell Award (shortlisted): Our House
- 2019 Amazon Publishing Readers Award Best Crime Novel (shortlisted): Our House
- 2019 Audible Sounds of Crime Award (shortlisted): Our House
