= Emily English =

English nutritionist (born 1995)

- Born: Emily Claire English; 1 July 1995 (age 31); Bedford, Bedfordshire, England
- Education: King's College London
- Years active: 2020–present
- Spouse: Aaron McFeely (m. 2024)
- Website: www.emilyenglish.com

Emily Claire English (born 1995), also known as Em the Nutritionist, is an English nutritionist, food writer, Internet personality and former model. Her debut cookbook So Good (2024) became a #1 Sunday Times bestseller.

== Early life ==
English was born in Bedford and grew up on a council estate in a "family of cooks and chefs who loved food". Her grandmother ran the restaurant Cornfields in Colmworth. She has one older brother, a pair of younger twin brothers, and a younger sister.

English attended Bedford Girls' School. At age 17, she was scouted at V Festival to model for ASOS. However, a negative comment about her body pushed her towards disordered eating for a time until she sought help from a therapist and quit modeling. Having deferred a university place intending to study Biomedical Science, English went on to graduate with a Bachelor of Science (BSc) in Nutrition from King's College London in 2019.

== Career ==
English began her career working day nutrition jobs before setting up her own personalised clinic. In 2020 during the COVID-19 lockdown, English started posting short-form recipe and other lifestyle videos on social media. She has since gained over a million followers on Instagram and a over 10 million likes on TikTok. She aims combine her nutritional and culinary backgrounds.

In October 2023, Seven Dials (an Orion Books imprint) acquired the rights to publish English's debut cookbook So Good in May 2024. So Good opened at #1 on The Sunday Times bestseller list and was shortlisted for a British Book Award and Amazon Books UK's Non-Fiction Book of the Year.

Also in 2024, English produced a Super Glow menu for Harvey Nichols and launched her probiotic brand Epētome.

She has been featured in Women's Health, Cosmopolitan UK, Woman & Home, Vogue, The Telegraph, YOU Magazine and Hello!

== Personal life ==
English is based in West London. She married Aaron McFeely (born 1986) at Fulham Palace in September 2024.

== Selected works ==
=== Cookbooks ===
- So Good (2024)
- Live to Eat (2025)
- So Good Express (2026)

=== Booklets ===
- Nutrition Essentials (2023)
