= Mummy Laid an Egg =

Book by Babette Cole

- Author: Babette Cole
- Language: English
- Publisher: Red Fox
- Publication date: 1994
- Publication place: United Kingdom
- Pages: 40
- ISBN: 0-09-929911-9
- OCLC: 028748362

Mummy Laid an Egg: or, Where do Babies Come From? is a children's book by English author Babette Cole. It was published in 1994 and won the British Book Awards Children's Book of the Year in that year.

It has also been published as Mommy Laid an Egg in the United States. Under that title it was listed as number 82 in the American Library Association's "100 Most Frequently Challenged Books of 1990-2000".

== Plot introduction ==
The book is a sex education book for young children, and Publishers Weekly's reviewer said that Cole "unleashes her endearingly loony sense of humor on the subject of the birds and the bees, and the result is, as expected, hilarious." In the book a couple of parents attempt to explain the facts of life to their two children, who respond to their apparently ignorant parents by explaining matters to them, with stick-figure illustrations.

== Translations ==
Translations into Welsh (Wy Mam! (Mummy Laid an Egg!)), Spanish (Mama Puso Un Huevo!: O Como Se Hacen Los Ninos) and Greek (Η μαμά γέννησε ένα αυγό!) have also been published.
