= Rosamund Young =

English farmer and writer

Rosamund Young is an English farmer and author. Her book, The Secret Life of Cows was a finalist for the 2018 British Book Award for Non-fiction Narrative Book of the Year.

== Books ==
- First Buy a Field: The Realist's Guide to Self-Sufficiency (2008)
- The Secret Life of Cows (2017)
- The Wisdom of Sheep: Observations from a Family Farm (2023)
