= G. T. Karber =

American author

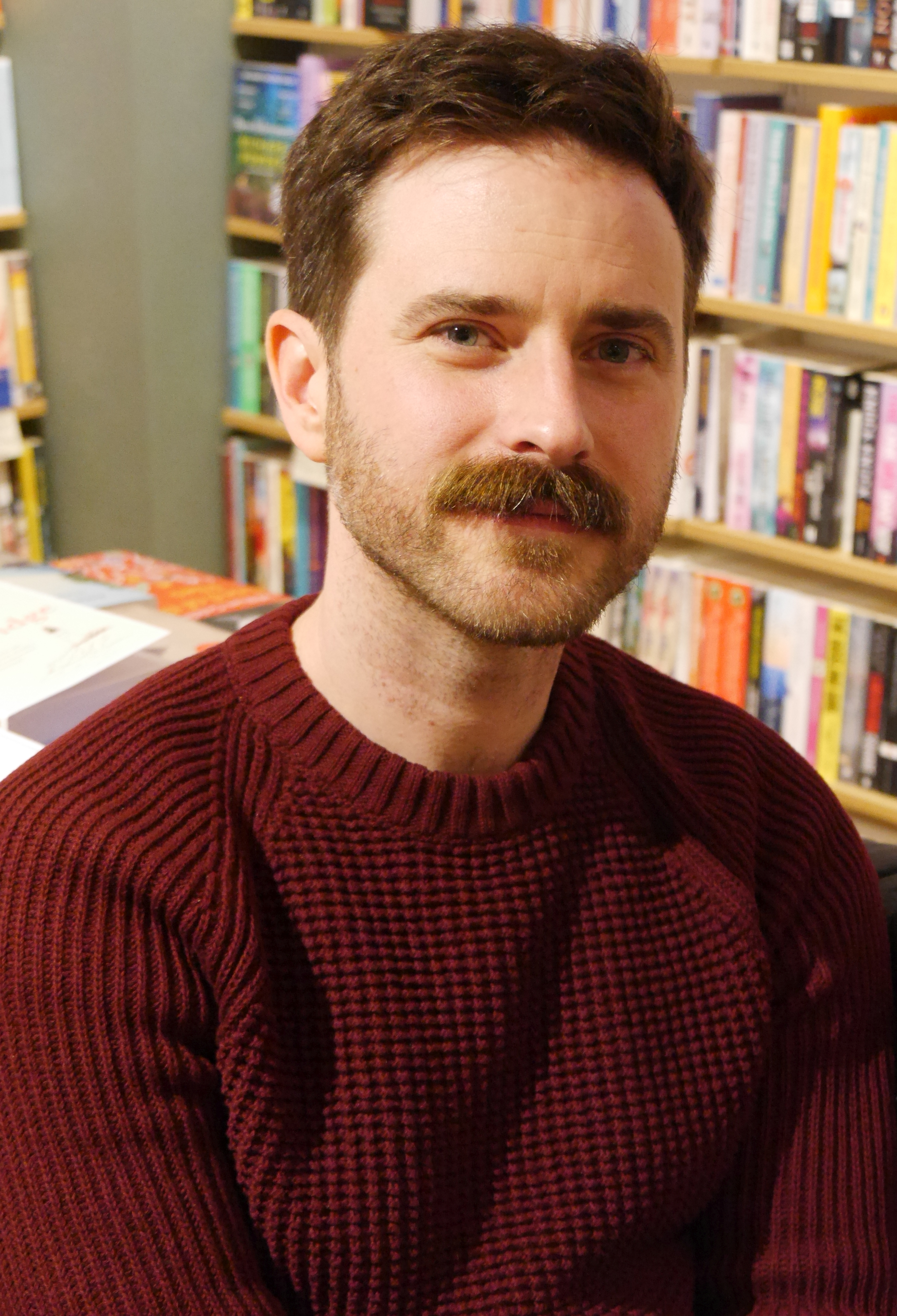
Karber at Waterstones, London in 2023

Gregory Thomas Karber is an American writer, best known as author of the Murdle series of murder mystery puzzle books and its accompanying website.

== Early life ==
Karber was raised in Arkansas, the son of a judge and a civil rights attorney. His maternal grandfather worked as an FBI agent in San Francisco in the 1960s.

He earned a bachelor's degree in mathematics and English literature from the University of Arkansas, and a Master of Fine Arts degree from the USC School of Cinematic Arts.

== Career ==
After graduating with his MFA, Karber remained in Los Angeles and worked adapting novels into screenplays. As of 2013, he had written five unpublished novels. He also began making comedic YouTube videos.

In 2013, he came across some 2006 comments by Abercrombie & Fitch CEO Mike Jeffries: "In every school there are the cool and popular kids, and then there are the not-so-cool kids. Candidly, we go after the cool kids...A lot of people don't belong [in our clothes], and they can't belong. Are we exclusionary? Absolutely." Karber made a video excoriating Jeffries' comments titled "Fitch the Homeless," in which he handed out Abercrombie & Fitch clothing to homeless people on Los Angeles' Skid Row. The video became a viral hit, earning national media coverage. While many initially applauded the video, others saw it as "backwards-ass activism" and "as insensitive as the A&F chief he's targeting."

Karber is a computer programmer. In 2016, he and Dani Messerchmidt created an online quiz called Trump or Jesus, which became a viral hit.

A mystery enthusiast, in 2022 he created Murdle, a web-based daily murder mystery game modeled on logic grid puzzles. The first two paperback volumes of Murdle were published in 2023, with the third volume published in March 2024.

In December 2023, Karber undertook a U.K. bookshop tour, and appeared on BBC Radio 4's Start the Week. For Christmas 2023, Murdle was the bestselling book in the U.K., making Karber only the third non-British person to achieve that distinction, following Dan Brown and Michelle Obama. In May 2024, Murdle received the British Book Award for overall book of the year.

In January 2025, Karber announced his next family of puzzles, Bordergrams, a "spy connection puzzle" debuting in September 2025.

== Personal life ==
Karber lives in Los Angeles.

== Publication Order of Murdle Books ==
Murdle: Volume 1	(2023)
Murdle: Volume 2	(2023)
Murdle: Volume 3	(2024)
The School of Mystery	(2024)
The Case of the Seven Skulls	(2025)
Merry Murdle	(2025)
Murdle Heist	(2026)

== Publication Order of Murdle Jr. Books ==
Curious Crimes for Curious Minds	(2024)
Sleuths on the Loose (With: Chris Grabenstein)	(2025)
Ready, Set, Solve!	(2025)
