= David Mark (novelist) =

English novelist (born 1977)

- Born: David John Mark; 28 December 1977 (age 48); Carlisle, England, United Kingdom
- Occupation: Writer
- Writing career
- Period: 2012–present
- Genres: Fiction; crime; thriller
- Notable work: DS Aector McAvoy series
- Website: davidmarkwriter.co.uk

David John Mark (born 28 December 1977) is an English novelist and journalist, known for his DS Aector McAvoy series of crime fiction books.

Mark's debut novel, entitled Dark Winter, became one of Richard & Judy's Book Club picks in 2012. The book has sold hundreds of thousands of copies, been critically acclaimed around the world, and been translated into six languages. The series was optioned for TV.

The follow-up Original Skin was released in March 2013. It continues the story of DS Aector McAvoy, a Scottish policeman based in Hull's Serious And Organised Crime Unit, as he investigates suspicious deaths within the city's underworld while contending with changing politics within the force. The third novel, Sorrow Bound, was also a critical success. The fourth book, Taking Pity, was acclaimed internationally.

In 2014 he signed with Mulholland Books, an imprint of Hodder and Stoughton. He released McAvoy novels Dead Pretty, Scorched Earth, Cruel Mercy, and Cold Bones, as well as historical novel The Zealot's Bones, which was one of The Sunday Times' Books of the Year in 2017.

Before signing his publishing deal with Quercus, Mark was a journalist specialising in crime reporting for a number of newspapers and agencies, most notably for The Yorkshire Post in their Hull office. He also spent time as a showbusiness reporter for PA Media.

In 2018, a stage adaptation of Dark Winter received its world premiere in Hull. Tickets sold out quickly.

He then signed a deal with Severn House Publishers. His first book with them, The Mausoleum, was a critical success.

== Books ==
=== DS Aector McAvoy series ===
Order	Title	Year
1	The Dark Winter	2012
2	Original Skin	2013
3	Sorrow Bound	2014
4	Taking Pity	2015
5	Dead Pretty	2016
6	Cruel Mercy	2015
7	Scorched Earth	2018
8	Cold Bones	2019
0.5	Darkness Falls	2020
9	Past Life	2021

=== Standalone books ===
- The Zealot's Bones (2017)
- The Mausoleum (2019; paperback published as The Burying Ground, 2020)
- A Rush of Blood (2019)
- Borrowed Time (2020)
- Blood Money (2020)
- Still Waters (2020)
- Suspicious Minds (2020)
- Piece of Mind (2021)
- Anatomy of a Heretic (2022)
- The Whispering Dead (2022)
- Twist of Fate (2023)
