= Melissa Cummings-Quarry =

British writer

Melissa Cummings-Quarry is a British author and co-founder of the Black Girls' Book Club, a literary and social events platform aimed at Black women in the UK.

== Life ==
At secondary school in North-East London, Cummings-Quarry met Natalie A. Carter. The pair bonded over their enjoyment of books, swapping titles such as Zora Neale Hurston's Their Eyes Were Watching God and Alice Walker's The Color Purple. Cummings-Quarry became a business development manager, but kept up her friendship with Carter. In 2016 the pair founded the Black Girls' Book Club together. Sixty people turned up for their first brunch and books event, and since then they have hosted regular events for hundreds of black women. Guests at their events have included Afua Hirsch, June Sarpong, Gabourey Sidibe, Malorie Blackman, Roxane Gay, Angie Thomas and Munroe Bergdorf.

Grown: The Black Girls' Guide to Glowing Up, co-written with Carter, was published by Bloomsbury Publishing in 2021. Grown was shortlisted for Children's Non-fiction Book of the Year in the 2022 British Book Awards. It was also longlisted for the 2022 Jhalak Prize.

Cummings-Quarry has written for i and Time Out. In 2021 she contributed to a BBC / Open University documentary, What does reading on screens do to our brains?. In 2022 she served as a judge for the BBC Young Writers' Award.

== Works ==
- (with Natalie A. Carter) Grown: The Black Girls' Guide to Glowing Up. Bloomsbury Publishing, 2021.
