= Jane Dunn (baker) =

Baker and food writer

- Born: Jane Elizabeth Schofield Dunn; 20 October 1992 (age 33); Portsmouth, England
- Education: Ashburton Chefs Academy
- Years active: 2014–present
- Culinary career
- Cooking style: Baking
- Website: www.janespatisserie.com

Jane Elizabeth Schofield Dunn (born 20 October 1992) is an English baking blogger, author and photographer. She started the blog Jane's Patisserie in 2014 and gained an online following. Her debut book of the same title (2021) became the fastest selling baking book of all time. She has since authored four further Sunday Times bestselling books.

== Early life ==
Dunn was born in Portsmouth. She had "academic" parents, her father an electronic engineering lecturer and her mother a college vice-principal, while her grandmother was a "very accomplished baker". Dunn attended Kingscourt School in Catherington and then Portsmouth High School. In 2014, Dunn pursued a six-month diploma at Ashburton Chefs Academy in Devon.

== Career ==
Upon completing her six-month diploma, Dunn started a blog and corresponding Instagram account titled Jane's Patisserie in November 2014 to share her recipes and food photography. Her first viral recipe in 2015 was for Rolos cheesecake. Dunn subsequently steadily built an Instagram following of nearly 200 thousand by early 2020. During the COVID-19 lockdown, Dunn's her audience expanded significantly as she started uploading videos.

In summer 2020, Ebury Press offered Dunn her first cookbook deal, through which Dunn published her debut book Jane's Patisserie in August 2021. Months ahead of its publication, the book reached #1 on the Amazon Non-Fiction Chart. Upon publication, Jane's Patisserie debuted at #1 on the UK Official chart and sold over 44 thousand copies within the first three days, making it the fastest selling baking book of all time, according to The Times. Jane's Patisserie was shortlisted for a British Book Award. Dunn also made her television debut appearing in episodes of the ITV daytime programme This Morning.

Dunn reunited with Ebury Press for the publication of her second and cookbooks Jane's Patisserie Celebrate! in 2022, which also debuted at #1 on the bestseller chart, and Jane's Patisserie Everyday in 2023. This was followed by Jane's Patisserie Easy Favourites in 2024 and Jane's Patisserie Classic in 2025.

== Bibliography ==
- Jane's Patisserie (2021)
- Jane's Patisserie Celebrate! (2022)
- Jane's Patisserie Everyday (2023)
- Jane's Patisserie Easy Favourites (2024)
- Jane's Patisserie Classic (2025)
