= That's You! =

2017 video game

- Developer: Wish Studios
- Publisher: Sony Interactive Entertainment
- Platform: PlayStation 4
- Release: 4 July 2017
- Genre: Party
- Mode: Multiplayer

That's You! is a 2017 party game developed by British studio Wish Studios and published by Sony Interactive Entertainment for the PlayStation 4. It is the inaugural title of Sony's PlayLink range.

== Gameplay ==
That's You!, as with all titles on Sony's PlayLink range, allows 2-6 players to use their phones and tablet devices as controllers via a companion app. This connects to the PlayStation 4 through the host Wi-Fi network.

That's You is hosted by a southern American narrator, who takes the group through a succession of themed social situations. These ask the players questions and set them challenges to find out how well they know one another.

During the game's set-up players are asked to choose a playing card based on Jungian archetypes. and take a selfie, to which numerous filters can be applied. The selfies can be retaken at any point and form an integral part of the gameplay.

To score, players must vote on who they think best answers the question through secret ballots on their phones. As the questions are subjective and there is no correct answer, points are awarded by voting consensus, with the scores increasing relative to the number of players in agreement. The game then elaborates by focusing on a selected individual and getting the players to draw, write, and perform challenges based on their knowledge of them. These rounds are similarly scored by consensus.

=== Pass It On ===
The That’s You! app features a standalone multiplayer Pass It On game, similar to the Final Game, in which a player is asked to take a selfie and embellish it using the app's art tools, according to a set challenge. After 10 seconds they are prompted to hand the device over to another player to further embellish or undermine. The device is exchanged until the picture is considered complete.

=== User Generated Content ===
Players can create their own content for That’s You!, with the option of either writing their own Question Game text questions, or completing an app-based picture challenge, which the game then converts into a photo-based Question Game asset.

== Reception ==
Reception

Aggregate score
Aggregator	Score
Metacritic	(PS4) 70/100

Review score
Publication	Score
GamePro	78%

That's You! received "Mixed or average" reviews from 27 critics on Metacritic. The game has been praised for its art style, themed after American independent filmmaking.

GamePro gave a positive review, awarding the game 78%. GamePro praised That's You!'s graphics and sense of humour, but did critique the game for being too long. Hardcore Gamer also gave a positive review, giving the game a 7/10 and praising its use of the PlayStation Link technology, but reviewer Tyler Robertson raised concerns that the game's price compared unfavourably with the competing Jackbox Party Pack. IGN Spain gave a mixed review, stating that the game was visually appealing but repetitive, and especially criticised That's You's two-player mode as boring. Eurogamer Italy concurred that the game was repetitive and boring in a generally negative review.

=== Accolades ===
The game won the award for "Casual/Social Game" at The Independent Game Developers' Association Awards 2017, whereas its other nominations were for "Game by a Small Studio" and the "Creativity and Heritage Award". It was also nominated for "Best Family/Social Game" at the 2017 Game Critics Awards, and for "Gameplay Innovation" at the 2018 Develop Awards.
