= The Wife Between Us =

2018 novel by Greer Hendricks and Sarah Pekkanen

- First edition
- Author: Greer Hendricks; Sarah Pekkanen
- Language: English
- Genre: Thriller
- Published: January 2, 2018
- Publisher: Pan Macmillan
- Publication place: United States
- Pages: 346 pp

The Wife Between Us is a 2018 thriller novel written by Greer Hendricks and Sarah Pekkanen.

== Plot ==
Vanessa Thompson's life has unraveled after her divorce from Richard. Living with her Aunt Charlotte and working in high-end retail, she becomes obsessed with his new fiancée, convinced she sees signs of Richard's manipulation and control. Once again feeling isolated and anxious, Vanessa fixates on the impending marriage—her jealousy masking a deeper concern.

Parallel to this, Nellie, a nervous pre-school teacher, is preparing to marry Richard. She's plagued by anxiety, insomnia, and unsettling phone calls, but Richard is her anchor—charming, protective, and seemingly perfect. Nellie falls into plans for their future, even as traces of her hidden past emerge.

As the tales unfold in tandem, Vanessa's narrative descends into blame and bitterness, while Nellie's builds hope and anticipation. Then comes the twist: Nellie is Vanessa—Vanessa's younger self. The narrative duality is revealed as one person at different points in her life, framed by Richard's nickname for her: “Nellie.”

Flashbacks reveal a toxic and abusive marriage. Richard isolates Vanessa, gaslights her, and turns controlling. He lies about a fertility test and becomes increasingly violent. Vanessa realizes Richard must end the marriage himself to avoid physical harm. To trigger his betrayal, she arranges an affair between Richard and Emma, his assistant.

Once Richard and Emma begin to grow close, Vanessa fears Emma will fall into the same trap. She desperately tries to warn her but finds Emma dismissive. Vanessa obtains evidence of Richard's manipulation. She uses these to alert Emma, though Emma initially doubts her. Seeing how terrified Vanessa is of Richard, Emma investigates and confirms Vanessa's allegations and agrees to leave him but Vanessa fears Richard will react violently or else just move onto another woman to abuse.

In a climactic showdown, Vanessa confronts Richard over his years of lies and abuse and provokes Richard into strangling her, exposing his violent nature in front of Emma. The truth is finally witnessed. Richard is sent to inpatient therapy and overseen by Maureen, his older sister.

A final twist reveals Emma is the daughter of Vanessa's college professor, with whom Vanessa had an affair years earlier, which lead to Emma's family splitting apart. Emma's relationship with Richard was motivated by revenge against Vanessa, but she eventually learns Vanessa was also unaware of the professor's personal life. The women part amicably.

Kate, Vanessa's therapist, is revealed to actually be Richard's first wife, who also suffered his abuse which left her with a permanent limp. Her involvement explains why Vanessa felt watched and supported through her ordeal.

== Critical reception ==
The New York Times wrote "The novel is halfway over before the first reveal, but it’s worth the wait, if only for its singularity. Then the twists come fast and furious."

== Translations ==
Language	Title	Translator	Year of Publication	Publisher	ISBN
Arabic	الزوجة التي بيننا	alharith alnubhan (الحارث النبهان)	2018	Dar Altanweer	ISBN 9786144720349

== Film adaptation ==
In 2017 the film rights for The Wife Between Us were purchased by Steven Spielberg's Amblin Partners.
