= Haemin (monk) =

South Korean Buddhist teacher (1973-)

- Title: Buddhist Teacher; Writer

Personal life
- Born: December 12, 1973 (age 52) Daejeon, South Korea

Religious life
- Religion: Buddhism
- Lineage: Jogye Order

Korean name
- Hangul: 주봉석
- RR: Ju Bongseok
- MR: Chu Pongsŏk

Dharma name
- Hangul: 혜민
- Hanja: 慧敏
- RR: Hyemin
- MR: Hyemin

Haemin (born December 12, 1973) is a South Korean teacher and writer of the Seon Buddhism tradition.

== Biography ==
Haemin is a Seon Buddhist teacher, writer and the founder of the School of Broken Hearts in Seoul. Born in South Korea and educated at Berkeley, Harvard, and Princeton, he received formal monastic training from Haein monastery, South Korea and taught Asian religions at Hampshire College in Massachusetts for 7 years. His first book, The Things You Can See Only When You Slow Down has been translated to more than 35 different languages and sold over four million copies. His second book, Love for Imperfect Things was the number one bestseller of the year 2016 in South Korea and became available in multiple languages in 2019. Haemin resides in Seoul when not travelling to share his teachings.

In 2020 Haemin faced backlash over his secular lifestyle after appearing in a South Korean television program. In the show he had been shown living in a two-story house and going to work in an office developing a meditation app. The publication Korea JoongAngDaily wrote, that after the episode aired the monk was criticized on social media of living opposite to his teachings. In response, Haemin announced that he would be quitting all his public activities and returning to live in a Zen Buddhism education institution.

== Bibliography ==
- The things you can see only when you slow down. Penguin Random House. 2017. ISBN 978-0143130772.
- Love for imperfect things. Penguin Random House. 2018. ISBN 978-0143132288.
- When things don't go your way: Zen wisdom for difficult times. Penguin Random House. 2024. ISBN 978-0241457290.

=== Audio ===
- Haemin Sunim: Audible Sessions. Audible Studios. 2017. ASIN B077H5LRCQ
