= Kate Pankhurst =

British writer and illustrator

- Education: University of Central Lancashire
- Occupations: Writer and illustrator
- Writing career
- Language: English
- Genre: Picture books
- Website: www.katepankhurst.com

Kate Pankhurst is a British writer and illustrator, known for a series of children's picture books. She won second place in the 2002 Macmillan Prize for Picture Book Illustration.

== Early life ==
Kate Pankhurst was raised in Liverpool, England. She later credited an independent bookshop that she passed on the way to school as introducing her to books. Pankhurst was inspired by an issue of British comic The Beano to create her own comic, and after selling copies to her school friends, decided that she wanted to work in illustration when she grew older. Initially she sought to become a shoe designer, but while undertaking Bachelor of Arts and Master of Arts degrees at the University of Central Lancashire in illustration, she realised that she could work as a children's book illustrator.

== Career ==
After winning second place in the 2002 Macmillan Prize for Picture Book Illustration, she began working on the Mariella Mystery Investigates series. This was the published work which Pankhurst both wrote and illustrated. The series was acquired by Plum Pudding Illustration. She subsequently published through Bloomsbury.

Her first non-fiction work Fantastically Great Women Who Changed the World led Pankhurst to discover that she was distantly related to suffragette Emmeline Pankhurst, whom she featured in the book. Although she thought for a period that there was no connection, another family member confirmed the link through her paternal line. Pankhurst said that she had enjoyed promoting lesser known stories of women in the book, such as Gertrude Ederle and her crossing of the English Channel. As part of promoting the book, she spoke at schools and talked of her writing process, as well as appearing at the WayWord festival in Chester. A follow-up book was due to be published in February 2018.

In 2021 it was announced a new musical based on the book would be opening in Southampton in November. The show includes songs by songwriter Miranda Cooper and Jennifer Decilveo and a book by Chris Bush (Standing at the Sky's Edge) and follows Jade who decides to leave class to meet some of the most iconic women from history such as Frida Kahlo, Rosa Parks, Amelia Earhart, Marie Curie and, of course, Emmeline Pankhurst. The show's UK tour started in 2021 and continued until 2023.

In addition to working as an illustrator, Pankhurst also works with teachers and children to share and inspire a love for reading and the stories of notable women.

== Awards and honors ==
Pankhurst won second place in the 2002 Macmillan Prize for Picture Book Illustration.

Her name is one of those featured on the sculpture Ribbons, unveiled in 2024.

== Personal life ==
Pankhurst lives in Leeds with her family, and creates her books in a studio located in a former spinning mill. She has a dalmatian named Olive.
