= Dishoom (restaurant) =

British chain of Indian restaurants

Coordinates: 51.5124°N 0.1269°W

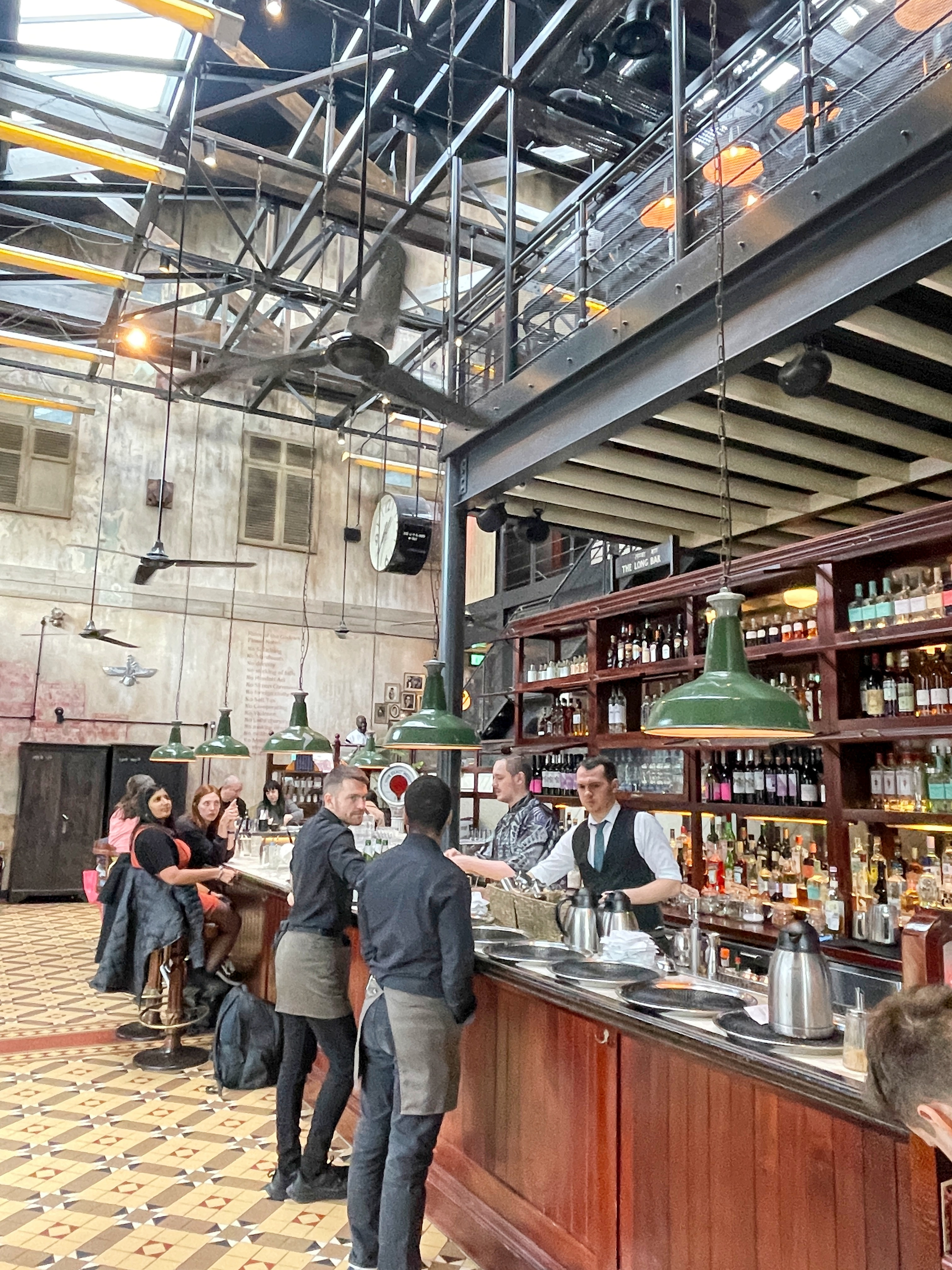
- Interior of Dishoom in King's Cross, London
- Industry: Restaurants
- Founded: 2010; 16 years ago
- Headquarters: London, England, UK
- Number of locations: 11 Dishoom Restaurants, 4 Dishoom Permit Room Restaurants
- Area served: Kensington, Covent Garden, Shoreditch, Canary Wharf, Manchester, King's Cross, Edinburgh, Carnaby, Birmingham, Battersea, Leeds.
- Key people: Shamil Thakrar, Kavi Thakrar, Naved Nasir
- Website: www.dishoom.com

Dishoom is a chain of Indian restaurants based in London, England. It was founded in 2010 by co-founders Shamil and Kavi Thakrar, along with Amar and Adarsh Radia, who both left the business in 2017. It was designed to match the Irani cafés popular in Bombay in the 1960s.

Described by some as Indian street food, the restaurant describes its offering as Bombay comfort food with an evolving menu. The menu includes breakfast naan.

The first Dishoom restaurant opened in 2010 in Covent Garden, London. In 2023, the brand opened its first spin-off concept, Permit Room. As of July 2025, the company operates 11 Dishoom restaurants across the UK and four Permit Room bars in Oxford, Cambridge, Brighton and Notting Hill.

== Cookbook ==
In 2019, Dishoom published a cookbook with recipes for many of their popular dishes and cocktails, while also taking the reader on a tour of south Bombay.

== Awards ==
- Best hospitality company to work for in the UK by Glassdoor, 2023
- Best hospitality company to work for in the UK by Glassdoor, 2022
- Ranked #4, Times Best Places to Work For in the UK, 2021
- Ranked #12, Best Places to Work for in the UK, 2021
- Best Restaurant Scotland, British Curry Awards, 2021
- Employer of the year, R200 Restaurant Awards 2021
- Ranked #19, Sunday Times Top 100 Companies to work for, 2017
- Best Overall Operator – under 20 sites – Restaurant Magazine R200, 2017
- Most Admired Brand – CGA, Peach Heroes and Icon Awards, 2018
- Restaurateur of the Year (Group) – The Catey's, 2018
- Diversity in Business – Edinburgh Business Award, 2018
- Best Breakfast Destination – The Scottish Food Awards, 2017
- Best Small Group – Good Food Guide UK, 2017
- Best Restaurant in the UK – Yelp! reviewers 2015 & 2016
- Best Casual Dining, British Curry Awards – winner, 2014 & 2016

== Charity ==
For every meal Dishoom serves, it donates "a meal to a child who would otherwise go hungry". They work with the charities Akshaya Patra (India) and Magic Breakfast (UK), founded by Carmel McConnell. "Collectively, Magic Breakfast and Akshaya Patra serve 21.8 million children in England, Scotland and India." As of January 2025, Dishoom claims to have donated more than 20 million meals.
