= Dapo Adeola =

British–Nigerian illustrator

- Born: London, England
- Genre: Children's illustration
- Years active: 2015–present
- Notable works: Look Up! (2020)

Dapo Adeola is a British-Nigerian illustrator. He co-created and illustrated the Waterstones children's book of 2020 Look Up!, which explored space science. Adeola is best known for creating graphics that challenge race and gender stereotypes.

== Early life and early career ==
Adeola was born parents of Nigerian origin and grew up in Brixton, South London. Toward the end of his time at high school, Adeola decided to pursue a career in graphic design. He studied art for General Certificate of Secondary Education (GCSE) and GCE Advanced Level. He started a foundation course in art, where he was trained in fine art, graphic design and photography. As illustration was not offered, Adeola taught himself through online courses. To support himself financially while studying, Adeola worked part time as a gym receptionist. Adeola's style and confidence grew, he started to share his artwork on Instagram. While in university, as part of his final year dissertation, Adeola wrote about how it was possible to teach children to spell and count through picture books. One of his lecturers said ‘whatever you do, do not stop drawing,’, and Adeola took their advice.

== Career ==
Through Instagram, Adeola met actor Nathan Bryon. Together, they started to write children's books. In 2019 Adeola and Bryon were signed by Puffin Books to write three part book series that explores the life of a young astronaut known as Rocket. The main character, Rocket, is based on one of Adeola's nieces.

When asked why it is important for young children to have access to books, Adeola remarked: "if you're not exposed to certain kinds of books it is difficult to envision yourself being in certain places, or to see positive and accurate reflections of yourself in the world."

Alongside his own writing, Adeola looks to support Black illustrators and creatives. In 2019 he created the Twitter hashtag #BlackBritishIllustrators, where Black British creatives share their artwork and stories.

Following the publication of Look Up!, Adeola complained that, even though it won both the overall award and the illustrated book award at the 2020 Waterstones Children's Book Prize and Bryon gave him full credit as an equal partner in the book's creation, both the book trade and the media minimized the significance of the illustrator's role. His open letter on the subject was endorsed by 800 writers.

=== Illustration and books ===
- Bryon, Nathan. Look up!. Adeola, Dapo. London. ISBN 978-0-241-34584-9. OCLC 1091653440.
- Haddow, Swapna. My dad is a grizzly bear. Adeola, Dapo. London. ISBN 978-1-5290-1396-2. OCLC 1144775160.
- Bryon, Nathan. Clean up!. Adeola, Dapo. London. ISBN 978-0-241-34589-4. OCLC 1158118785.
- Giles, L. R. (Lamar R.). The last last-day-of-summer. Adeola, Dapo. Boston. ISBN 978-1-328-46083-7. OCLC 1045472807.
