= Onyeka and the Academy of the Sun =

2022 novel by Tọlá Okogwu

- Author: Tọlá Okogwu
- Language: English
- Genre: Science Fiction
- Publisher: Simon & Schuster (UK); Masobe Books (Nigeria)
- Publication date: 14 June 2022 (UK); 14 July 2022 (Nigeria)
- Publication place: Nigeria
- Pages: 320
- ISBN: 978-1-3985-0508-7

Onyeka and the Academy of the Sun is a 2022 middle grade science fiction novel by British-Nigerian writer, journalist and hair care educator Tọlá Okogwu. This is Okogwu's debut novel, and it introduces readers to Onyeka, a British-Nigerian girl who discovers her hair has a psychokinetic ability and goes to an elite school in Nigeria where people like her are trained to save the country.

== Development ==
Tọlá Okogwu moved from Nigeria to the United Kingdom and always wanted to write a book set in the country. She got the inspiration for the novel after thinking about African and Black girls who have been taught to hate their natural hair and she toyed with the idea of having the hair they think to be a flaw become their greatest strengths. The novel was as inspired by Marvel universe and the science fiction movies she grew up watching with her parents.

== Reception ==
The book received generally positive receptions from book reviewers and readers alike. It was one of the most anticipated middle grade novels of 2022 by Book Riot, The Nerdist, and Publishers Weekly.

In an interview conducted by Kirkus Reviews, the novel was praised and called "a delightful blend of adventure, heart, and Africanfuturism. The Guardian wrote in its review that it's "a fast-paced, atmospheric magic-school fantasy for readers aged 8+, woven with deeper themes of identity and belonging." Publishers Weekly praised Okogwu's writing stating that "[i]n Okogwu's vividly created Nigerian world, technology and an exploration of emotional internality interplay with a child’s literalized relationship with her hair, making for an enjoyable X-Men-leaning series starter."

== Adaptation ==
Onyeka and The Academy of the Sun is in production at Westbrook Studios and Yoruba Saxon for Netflix. The film will be executive produced by Tọlá Okogwu, Heather Washington and Jessica Oyelowo, with Will Smith, Jon Mone and David Oyelowo serving as producers.
