= Mulholland Books (UK) =

- Parent company: Hodder & Stoughton
- Status: Active
- Founded: 2011
- Country of origin: United Kingdom
- Headquarters location: London, England
- Fiction genres: Suspense fiction
- Official website: http://www.mulhollandbooks.co.uk

Mulholland Books (UK) is an imprint of Hodder & Stoughton, a British publishing house, now a division of Hachette UK. It specialises in the suspense fiction genre including crime novels, thrillers, police procedurals, spy stories and supernatural suspense

== History ==
Mulholland Books at Hodder & Stoughton is the sister of the Mulholland Books (US) imprint at Little, Brown US. Both imprints launched spring 2011.

The imprint is named after Mulholland Drive – a winding stretch of road that follows the ridgeline of the Hollywood Hills. The mysteries of Mulholland have inspired countless novels, films and works of art, from the classic mysteries of Raymond Chandler and James M. Cain to the voices of James Ellroy, Michael Connelly, Michael Mann, David Lynch and David Hockney.

Building on that history, Mulholland Books aims to publish the best suspense fiction. Authors currently include Sabine Durrant, David Mark, Vaseem Khan, Warren Ellis, Sarah Alderson, Cristina Alger and Joe R. Lansdale. Mulholland have also published 35 of Leslie Charteris’s solo Saint novels.

== Notable publications ==
- Guilt by Association – Marcia Clark (2011)
- The Revisionists – Thomas Mullen (2011)
- Fun and Games – Duane Swierczynski (2011)
- Hell and Gone – Duane Swierczynski (2011)
- Triple Crossing – Sebastian Rotella (2011)
- Black Light – Patrick Melton, Marcus Dunstan and Stephen Romano
- Alpha – Greg Rucka (2012)
- Crossbones Yard – Kate Rhodes (2012)
- Guilt by Degrees – Marcia Clark (2012)
- The Right Hand – Derek Haas (2012)
- Edge of Dark Water – Joe R. Lansdale (2012)
- Breed – Chase Novak, pseudonym of Scott Spencer (2012)
- Fifteen Digits – Nick Santora (2012)
- The Iron Will of Shoeshine Cats – Hesh Kestin (2012)
- Enter the Saint – Leslie Charteris (December 2012)
- Gun Machine – Warren Ellis (2013)
- Point and Shoot – Duane Swierczynski (2013)
- The Unexpected Inheritance of Inspector Chopra – Vaseem Khan (2015)
- Lie With Me – Sabine Durrant (2016)
- Take Me In – Sabine Durrant (2018)
