= Dilly Court =

English author

- Born: 1940 (age 85–86); London, England
- Writing career
- Pen name: Lily Baxter
- Genre: Historical fiction
- Website: dillycourt.com

Dilly Court (born 1940) is an English author of popular historical fiction and family saga novels also writing under the pseudonym of Lily Baxter. She published her first book when she was 65 and, as of 2023, her novels have sold more than four million copies.

== Early life ==
Court grew up in northeast London, leaving school when she was 16 to work as a secretary at broadcaster Associated-Rediffusion. She began her career in television, writing scripts for commercials. Working in the advertising department, she was able to move into a copywriting position, which allowed her to exercise her love of writing.

== Literary career ==
Court did not begin writing novels until 1997, and it took until 2005 and a string of rejections before one was accepted for publication: Mermaids Singing. As of 2020, she has published more than 30 novels, and had multiple titles on The Sunday Times Bestseller List including The Button Box, which reached #2 in 2017. In 2023, her novel Dolly's Dream reached #2 on The Bookseller's Official Top 50 UK chart and #1 on their Mass Market Fiction chart.

Despite her impressive sales, her books have largely been ignored by critics. In 2020, Robbie Millen, literary editor for The Times, admitted that he hadn't previously heard of Court and that his paper had never reviewed any of her titles, nor had other major British newspapers.

== Personal life ==
Court has been married twice (in 1967, to a sea captain, and in 1995, to a dentist) and has two children. As of 2023, she resides in Dorset.

== Selected works ==
=== Standalone novels ===
- Mermaids Singing (December 2005)
- Tilly True (November 2006)
- The Best of Sisters (January 2007)
- A Mother's Courage (March 2008)
- The Constant Heart (July 2008)
- A Mother's Promise (January 2009)
- The Cockney Angel (August 2009)
- A Mother's Wish (January 2010)
- The Ragged Heiress (September 2010)
- A Mother's Secret (November 2010)
- The Cockney Sparrow (April 2011)
- The Dollmaker's Daughters (April 2011)
- Cinderella Sister (June 2011)
- A Mother's Trust (November 2011)
- The Lady's Maid (June 2012)
- The Best of Daughters (November 2012)
- The Workhouse Girl (June 2013)
- A Loving Family (November 2013)
- The Beggar Maid (September 2014)
- A Place Called Home (November 2014)
- The Orphan's Dream (September 2015)
- Ragged Rose (February 2016)
- The Swan Maid (June 2016)
- The Christmas Card (November 2016)
- The Button Box (June 2017)
- The Mistletoe Seller (November 2017)
- Nettie's Secret (August 2019)
- Rag-and-Bone Christmas (October 2020)
- The Reluctant Heiress (May 2021)
- A Thimble for Christmas (September 2023)
- The Snow Angel (October 2024)
- The Winter Belle (September 2025)
- The Wild Rose (January 2026)

=== Series ===
==== The River Maid series ====
- The River Maid (January 2018)
- The Summer Maiden (June 2018)
- The Christmas Rose (November 2018)

==== The Village Secrets series ====
- The Christmas Wedding (October 2019)
- A Village Scandal (March 2020)
- The Country Bride (June 2020)

==== The Rockwood Chronicles ====
- Fortune's Daughter (October 2021)
- Winter Wedding (January 2022)
- Runaway Widow (May 2022)
- Sunday's Child (August 2022)
- Snow Bride (October 2022)
- Dolly's Dream (February 2023)
- The Lucky Penny (June 2024)
- Poppy's Choice (January 2025)

=== As Lily Baxter ===
- Poppy's War (July 2010)
- We'll Meet Again (January 2011)
- Spitfire Girl (July 2011)
- The Girls in Blue (July 2012)
- The Shopkeeper's Daughter (July 2013)
- In Love and War (July 2014)
