= Gill Sims =

British author and blogger

Gill Sims (born 1978) is a bestselling British author and blogger.

Sims is the author of Why Mummy Drinks, which was the Sunday Times Fiction Bestseller of 2017. Why Mummy Swears was published in 2018, and Why Mummy Doesn't Give A **** in 2019.

In 2016, she began her Peter and Jane blog, which quickly gained a viral following. Her blog offers a comical response to issues facing parents. She has also written on postnatal depression for Netmums. Sims has been regularly profiled as a leading proponent of a "Mummy Blogger."

She lives in Scotland with her husband, two children, and border terrier, 'Judgy Dog'.

== Sources ==
- BBC profile, July 2017
- Guardian article, September 2016
