= LJ Ross =

British author of crime thrillers

- Born: Louise Ross; 10 February 1985 (age 41); Ponteland, Northumberland, England, United Kingdom
- Occupation: Writer
- Writing career
- Pen name: LJ Ross
- Period: 2015–present
- Genres: Fiction, crime and thriller
- Notable work: DCI Ryan Mystery series
- Website: ljrossauthor.com

Louise Ross (born 10 February 1985), known by her pen name LJ Ross, is the author of the DCI Ryan, Summer Suspense and Doctor Gregory series of mystery thrillers. Her debut novel, Holy Island, was released in January 2015 and, by May, it had reached number one in the Amazon UK chart. Its sequel, Sycamore Gap, released in September 2015, is also a UK bestseller. She released further books in the DCI Ryan series, amassing more than twenty UK No. 1s and selling over ten million copies. In 2024 Amazon reported that she was the second most read author on Kindle Unlimited in the UK in the decade 2014-2024.

== Early life ==
Ross was born and grew up in Ponteland, Northumberland, England. She completed undergraduate and postgraduate degrees in law at King's College London, where she met her husband, and continued her studies in Paris and Florence. After spending most of her twenties working in the City as a lawyer, she began to feel it was time for change.

== Publishing career ==
Ross wrote Holy Island having been inspired by the atmospheric beauty of Lindisfarne, an island off the northeast coast of England she knew well from childhood. Following its instant success, she now writes full-time. The second book in her series of DCI Ryan novels, Sycamore Gap, is set in Hadrian's Wall country and subsequent DCI Ryan novels continue the Northumbrian locations, with stories set in Northumberland, County Durham and Newcastle.

A multi-cast audio drama version of Ross's eleventh novel in the DCI Ryan Mysteries Series The Infirmary, a prequel, was performed by a number of high-profile actors including Kevin Whately, Tom Bateman, Hermione Norris, Alun Armstrong. Hugh Dancy and Richard Armitage narrated the audiobook versions of the Doctor Gregory novels.

The eighteenth instalment of the DCI Ryan series, The Rock, was the UK's third best-selling ebook of 2021, behind novels by Richard Osman and Matt Haig.

In 2022, Amazon UK reported that the DCI Ryan Mysteries series was its second-bestselling book series of all time.

Ross has twice been shortlisted for the British Book Awards 'Crime and Thriller Book of the Year' for her books Impostor (the first book in the Doctor Gregory series) and Bamburgh (book 19 in the DCI Ryan Mysteries series). She was also shortlisted for the prestigious Crime Writers' Association "Dagger in the Library" Award in 2021 and 2024.

Ross published all of her works independently through Dark Skies Publishing, a publishing imprint set up and managed by Ross and her husband until 2025 when she signed with Penguin.

== Personal life ==
Ross lives with her husband and two children in Northumberland.

== Philanthropy ==
Ross has founded several prizes to celebrate arts in the North East of England. She set up the Northern Photography Prize for images captured in the North East of England, the Lindisfarne Prize for Crime Fiction and the Northern Film Prize. In 2021, LJ Ross brought together 55 fellow authors from across the spectrum of publishing to produce Everyday Kindness, a charity anthology of short stories, the proceeds of which were donated to Shelter. The audiobook version of Everyday Kindness was narrated by several high-profile actors including Dame Julie Walters and Richard Armitage.

== Novels ==
=== DCI Ryan Mysteries series ===
Police procedural mystery/romantic suspense series set in Northumbria, England following Detective Chief Inspector Ryan.

Pub. order	Series order	Title	Year	ISBN	Locale
1	1	Holy Island	2015 (January)	978-1514642825	Holy Island
2	2	Sycamore Gap	2015 (September)	978-1518759567	Sycamore Gap
3	3	Heavenfield	2016 (March)	978-1530652686	Heavenfield
4	4	Angel	2016 (August)	978-1519010933	Angel of the North
5	5	High Force	2017 (January)	978-1520473383	High Force
6	6	Cragside	2017 (July)	978-1521748831	Cragside
7	7	Dark Skies	2017 (December)	978-1973448075	Kielder Forest
8	8	Seven Bridges	2018 (May)	978-1982967147	Newcastle upon Tyne
9	9	The Hermitage	2018 (October)	978-1728883397	Florence; Warkworth Hermitage
10	10	Longstone	2018 (December)	978-1790983124	Farne Islands
11	Prequel	The Infirmary	2019 (February)	978-1792780844	Newcastle upon Tyne
12	11	The Moor	2019 (April)	978-1095812655	Town Moor, Newcastle upon Tyne
13	12	Penshaw	2019 (July)	978-1073010417	Penshaw, City of Sunderland
14	13	Borderlands	2019 (September)	978-1696737326	Northumberland National Park
15	14	Ryan's Christmas	2019 (December)	978-1650141237	Chillingham, Northumberland; Chillingham Castle
16	15	The Shrine	2020 (April)	978-1912310166	Durham; Durham Cathedral
17	16	Cuthbert's Way	2020 (November)	978-1912310173	Durham; Durham Cathedral
18	17	The Rock	2021 (June)	978-1912310180	Northumberland; The North Sea
19	18	Bamburgh	2022 (April)	978-1912310197	Bamburgh
20	19	Lady's Well	2023 (April)	978-1912310203	Holystone
21	20	Death Rocks	2024 (April)	978-1912310210	Dunstanburgh Castle
22	21	Poison Garden	2024 (September)	978-1912310722	Alnwick Gardens
23	22	Belsay	2025 (January)	978-1912310234	Belsay
24	23	Berwick	2026 (February)	978-1529978940	Berwick-upon-Tweed
25	24	Raby	2028 (February)	978-1529978797	Raby Castle

=== DCI Ryan: The Met Years ===
The story of a younger Max Ryan.

Pub. order	Series order	Title	Year	ISBN	Locale
1	1	Time of Death	2027 (February)	978-1529978810	

=== Alexander Gregory Thrillers series ===
Forensic psychologist Doctor Alexander Gregory becomes involved in murder investigations.

Pub. order	Series order	Title	Pub. date	ISBN	Locale
1	1	Imposter	2019 (31 October)	978-1912310517	County Mayo
2	2	Hysteria	2019 (10 December)	978-1912310524	Paris
3	3	Bedlam	2020 (4 June)	978-1912310531	Catskill Mountains
4	4	Mania	2022 (3 March)	978-1912310548	London
5	5	Panic	2024 (2 May)	978-1912310654	Cambridge and London
6	6	Amnesia	2024 (24 October)	978-1912310562	London
6	6	Obsession	2026 (03 December)		

=== Summer Suspense Mysteries series ===
A suspense series set in rural Cornwall.

Pub. order	Series order	Title	Pub. date	ISBN	Locale
1	1	The Cove	2021 (31 July)	978-1912310920	Cornwall
2	2	The Creek	2022 (4 August)	978-1912310913	Cornwall
3	3	The Bay	2023 (28 September)	978-1912310937	St. Ives, Cornwall
4	4	The Haven	2024 (15 August)	978-1912310944	Cornwall
5	5	The Lizard	2026 (30 July)	978-1804960431	Cornwall

=== Short story anthology ===
Title	Pub. date	ISBN	Synopsis
Everyday Kindness: A collection of uplifting tales to brighten your day	13/11/2021	978-1912310005	Everyday Kindness is a charity anthology of short, fictional stories of kindness, edited by LJ Ross. These uplifting tales of hope and of small, everyday kindnesses are intended to support wider, positive mental health goals and foster wellbeing through the act of reading tales of goodwill inspired by others. All proceeds from the book are donated to Shelter, a charity that helps millions of people a year struggling with bad housing or homelessness.
