= Caroline Hirons =

Writer

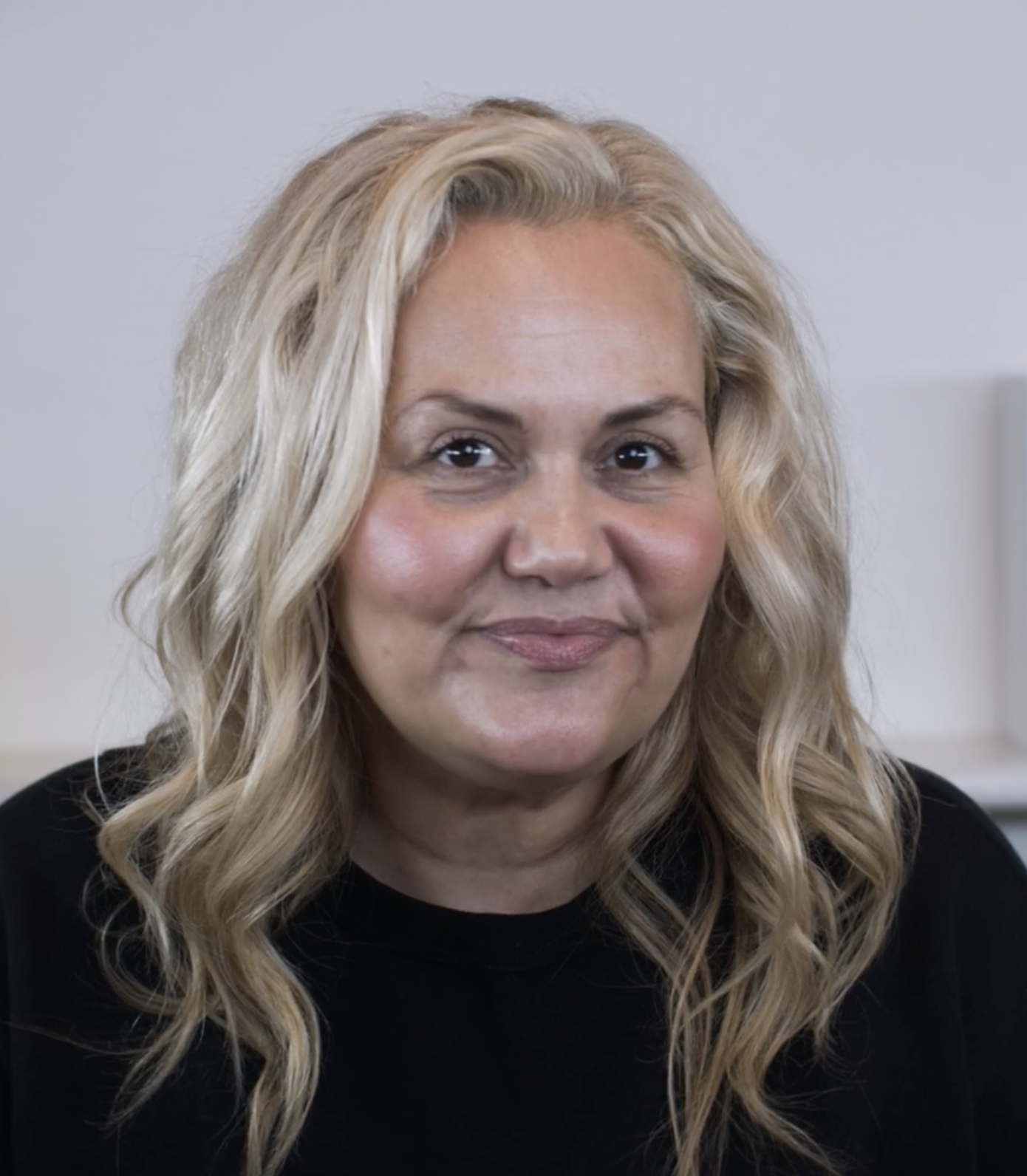
Hirons in 2020

Caroline Hirons is an aesthetician and writer who has been described as the "queen of skincare".

== Early life ==
Hirons was born in Liverpool and spent some of her childhood in the US. Her mother and grandmother worked in the beauty sections of department stores and she was influenced by their experiences and work ethic. At 17, in 1987, Hirons moved to London, where she worked in a record shop.

== Career ==
In 1997, she started working for Aveda at Harvey Nichols. She trained as a beauty therapist and had two more children, before eventually joining Space NK.

In 2010, she started blogging at the age of 40 and her blog took off in popularity. She was also a YouTuber, but left YouTube in 2021. In 2020 she published her book Skincare, which won the Non-Fiction Lifestyle Book of the Year 2021 at the British Book Awards. The book was a Number 1 Sunday Times Bestseller and is the UK's bestselling skincare title of all time. An updated version, Skincare: The New Edit, was published in November 2021. Her newest book Teen Skincare was published June 2025.

During the COVID-19 pandemic in the United Kingdom, Caroline launched the Beauty Backed fundraising initiative to support those in the industry who were directly impacted by the pandemic and subsequent lockdowns. The initiative raised over £600,000 between August and December of that year alone. In July 2022, Hirons launched the 'world's most comprehensive' skincare app, Skin Rocks. Reviews said that the app, which shot to number one on the Free App Download Chart, was "like having a skin expert in your pocket" and the "ultimate skincare shopping assistant". November 2022 saw Hirons launch her first ever Skin Rocks skincare line, starting with two retinoid products. The range now has over 5 products including the latest launches an eye cream and light moisturiser. In 2025 she developed professional line Skin Rocks Pro for salons.

== Personal life ==
Hirons has four children with her, now former, partner Jim Hirons. In January 2026 Hirons confirmed her separation from her husband after 32 years of marriage.

== Awards and honours ==
- Skincare (2020), Non-Fiction Lifestyle Book of the Year 2021 at the British Book Awards
