= Why Has Nobody Told Me This Before? =

2022 book by Julie Smith

- Author: Julie Smith
- Language: English
- Subject: Psychology
- Genre: Self-help book
- Published: 11 January 2022
- Publisher: HarperOne
- Media type: Hardcover
- Pages: 368
- ISBN: 978-0063227934
- OCLC: 1242466111

Why Has Nobody Told Me This Before? is a mental health self-help book by Julie Smith, a British clinical psychologist.

== Background ==
It is a self-help book focusing on mental health and wellbeing. It addresses challenges that people face on a daily basis and provides solutions that are useful.

== Reception ==
A review written by Professor Fiona Denney for the Academy of Management Learning and Education journal suggests, "The thesis of her book is to introduce advice and concepts that the author uses in her clinical therapeutic practice to an audience that might not be able to access psychotherapy. This is a book that is not only useful but is also realistic about the world in which we live and the desire of people to lead a meaningful life."
