= Nathan Bryon =

British actor and author

- Born: Nathan David Bryon; 3 July 1991 (age 35); Shepherd's Bush, London, England
- Occupations: Actor, author, screenwriter
- Years active: 2012–present

Nathan David Bryon (born 3 July 1991) is a British actor, author, and screenwriter. He gained prominence through his roles as Jamie Bennett in the BBC Three sitcom Some Girls (2012–2014) and Joey Ellis in the ITV sitcom Benidorm (2016–2018).

His screenwriting credits include the Sky Comedy series Bloods (2021–2022) and the film Rye Lane (2023).

== Early life ==
Bryon was born in Shepherd's Bush, London, to a white British father and a Jamaican mother. He attended ADT school (now Ashcroft Technology Academy) in Putney.

== Career ==
In June 2019, Puffin published Bryon's first book, Look Up!, conceived jointly with illustrator Dapo Adeola. It won both the overall award and the illustrated book award at the 2020 Waterstones Children's Book Prize. Adeola later complained that, although Bryon had given him full credit for his part in the book's creation, both the book trade and the media minimized the significance of the illustrator's role.

Bryon published a play in July 2019 called Dexter and Winter's Detective Agency and another book in July 2020 called Clean Up.

In March 2021, Puffin announced Bryon as the first Puffin World of Stories ambassador.

Bryon wrote and co-created Bloods, a sitcom on Sky Comedy which debuted in 2021. He co-wrote his first feature film screenplay, Rye Lane, with Tom Melia; it was directed by Raine Allen-Miller and premiered at the 2023 Sundance Film Festival.

In May 2023 he appeared in an episode of celebrity Catchphrase on ITV.

During the week of 24 November 2025, he appeared in Richard Osman's House of Games on BBC2.

== Filmography ==
Television
Year	Title	Role	Notes
2012–2014	Some Girls	Jamie Bennett	11 episodes
2013	Casualty	Shaun Wooton	Series 28; episode 4
2016–2018	Benidorm	Joey Ellis	Series 8–10; 24 episodes
2020–2023	Ghosts	Obi	7 episodes
2021–2022	Bloods	Writer and Creator	16 Episodes
2023	Catchphrase	Himself	
2025	Richard Osman's House of Games	Himself	5 Episodes
