= A. F. Steadman =

British author

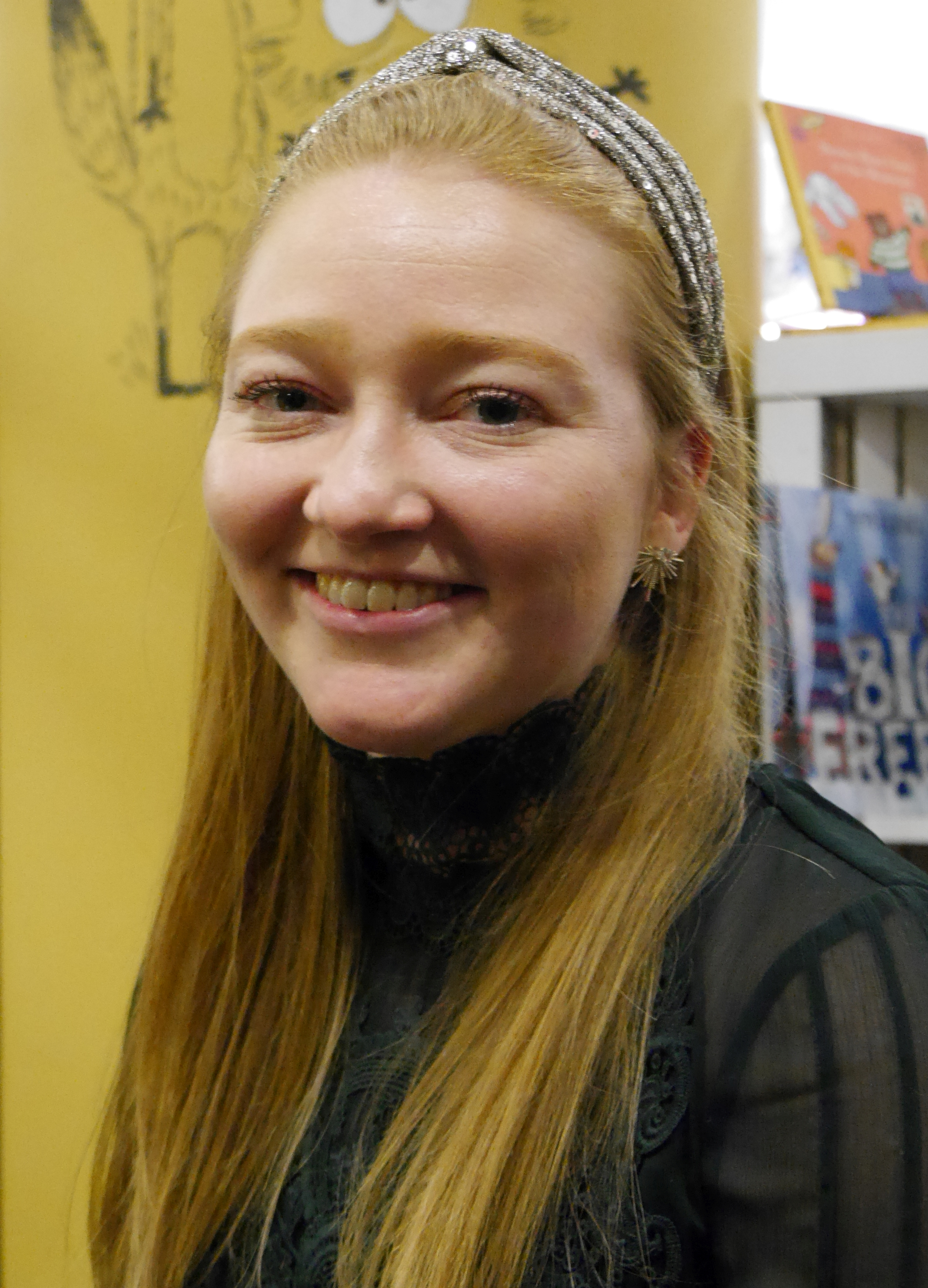
- Steadman at Waterstones, Piccadilly in 2022
- Born: 1992 (age 33–34)
- Education: Selwyn College, Cambridge
- Occupation: Author
- Years active: 2020–present

Annabel Steadman (born 1992), who writes as A. F. Steadman, is a British author.

== Early life and education ==
Steadman was educated at The King's School, Canterbury, Kent, from 2005, attending on music and academic scholarships. She then studied law at Selwyn College, Cambridge, and followed by a Master of Studies (MSt) degree in creative writing at Cambridge.

== Author ==
In 2020, Steadman received a "seven-figure" three-book contract for a fantasy series about "bloodthirsty unicorns". This is believed to be the largest ever advance deal for a debut children's writer. In the same week film rights were acquired by Sony Pictures.

In 2022, Skandar and the Unicorn Thief, the first book in the Skandar series, was published. The Sunday Times called it an "engrossing tale". In November 2022, it was announced that Simon & Schuster had acquired three more books from Steadman. This will bring the Skandar series to five books, plus one untitled novel. The second book in the series, Skandar and the Phantom Rider, was published on 2 May 2023. The third book in the series, Skandar and the Chaos Trials, was published on 25 April 2024. The fourth book in the series, Skandar and the Skeleton Curse, was published on 10 October 2024. The fifth and final book in the series, Skandar and the Spirit War, was published on 28 August 2025.

On 24 August 2025, A.F. Steadman announced that a prequel novel entitled The First Unicorn Rider would be released on 6 November 2025.

== Publications ==
- Skandar and the Unicorn Thief, Simon & Schuster, 2022.
- Skandar and the Phantom Rider, Simon and Schuster, 2023.
- Skandar and the Chaos Trials, Simon and Schuster, 2024.
- Skandar and the Skeleton Curse, Simon and Schuster, 2024.
- Skandar and the Spirit War, Simon and Schuster, 2025.
- The First Unicorn Rider, Simon and Schuster, 2025
- Zeno and the Dragon Riders, Simon and Schuster, 2027
