= Babette Cole =

English children's writer and illustrator

Dame Babette Cole
- Born: 10 September 1950; Jersey
- Died: 15 January 2017 (aged 66); Devon
- Education: Canterbury College of Art
- Occupations: Children's writer and illustrator
- Writing career
- Language: English and French.
- Notable works: Drop Dead, Princess Smartypants, Prince Cinders
- Notable awards: Kurt Maschler Award, Children's Picture Book of The Year; Children's Books of the Year; Child Study Association of America, BLA Annabell Fargeon Award

Babette Cole (10 September 1950 – 15 January 2017) was an English children's writer and illustrator.

== Life and career ==
Cole was born on Jersey in the Channel Islands. She attended the Canterbury College of Art (now the University for the Creative Arts) and received first-class BA Honours. She worked on such children's programmes as Bagpuss (working with Oliver Postgate and Peter Firmin) and Jackanory for BBC television.

As a children's writer, Cole created more than 150 picture books. Her best-seller Doctor Dog has been adapted as a successful children's cartoon series. Much of her work is earthy comedy, having titles like The Smelly Book, The Hairy Book, The Slimy Book and The Silly Book.

She spent her time writing, visiting schools and travelling. After a short illness she died on 15 January 2017, aged 66.

== Awards ==
Cole won the Kurt Maschler Award, or the Emil, for Drop Dead (Jonathan Cape, 1996), which she wrote and illustrated. The former award from Maschler Publications and Booktrust annually recognised one British "work of imagination for children, in which text and illustration are integrated so that each enhances and balances the other."

She was one of several commended runners-up for the Kate Greenaway Medal, the annual Library Association award for illustration in British children's books, for both Princess Smartypants (1986) and Prince Cinders (1987). (Note: Today there are usually eight books on the Greenaway shortlist. According to CCSU, some runners-up were Commended (from 1959) or Highly Commended (from 1974). There were 99 distinctions of both kinds in 44 years including six for 1986, three 1987.)

Cole won many other awards for her books:

- Nungu and the Hippopotamus (1980) — Children's Picture Book of The Year; Children's Books of the Year; Child Study Association of America
- The Wind in the Willows Pop-Up Book (1983) — New York Public Library Children's Books
- Princess Smartypants (1986) — British Library Association (BLA)
- Prince Cinders (1987) — BLA Annabell Fargeon Award
- Drop Dead (1996) — The British Book Trust
