= Zuzu =

Zuzu or Zu Zu may refer to:

== Places ==
- Zu Zu, Tennessee, United States, an unincorporated community
- Zuzu (Tanzanian ward), Dodoma Urban, Dodoma Region, Tanzania, an administrative ward

== People ==
- Zuzu (given name)
- Zuzu Angel, Brazilian fashion designer
- Zuzu Bollin, a Texan blues guitarist
- Zuzu Divine, female Mexican professional wrestler
- Züleyxa Izmailova (born 1985), Estonian journalist and politician
- Zuzu Zakaria, Norwegian-Azerbaijani singer and electronic music producer
- Lóránt Méhes Zuzu, Hungarian artist

== Arts, entertainment, media ==
- Say Zuzu, a US roots rock band
- Zuzu Bailey, a character in the film It's a Wonderful Life
- Zuzu Angel (film), a 2006 movie based on the life of Brazilian fashion designer Zuzu Angel
- ZuZu & the Supernuffs, a KidsCo animated children's TV series
- Nick and Zuzu, a syndicated comic strip by Nick Galifianakis

== Other uses ==
- Zu Zu Ginger Snaps, a brand of ginger snaps
- Zūzū-ben, an informal name in Japanese for the Tōhoku dialect of the Japanese language

== See also ==
- Zu (disambiguation)
