= Lover Man (disambiguation) =

"Lover Man", or "Lover Man (Oh, Where Can You Be?)", is a 1941 song made popular by Billie Holiday.

Lover Man may also refer to:

- Lover Man (Duke Jordan album), 1979
- Lover Man (Archie Shepp album), 1989
- Lover Man: A Tribute to Billie Holiday, John Hicks 1993
- "Lover Man", song by Jimi Hendrix from Isle of Wight
- "Loverman", a 1994 song by Nick Cave
- "Loverman", song by Train from A Girl, a Bottle, a Boat

== See also ==
- Mr Loverman, a 2013 novel by Bernardine Evaristo
  - Mr Loverman, a 2024 TV mini-series adaptation of the novel, starring Lennie James
- "Mr. Loverman", a 1992 song by Shabba Ranks
