= Azucena (name) =

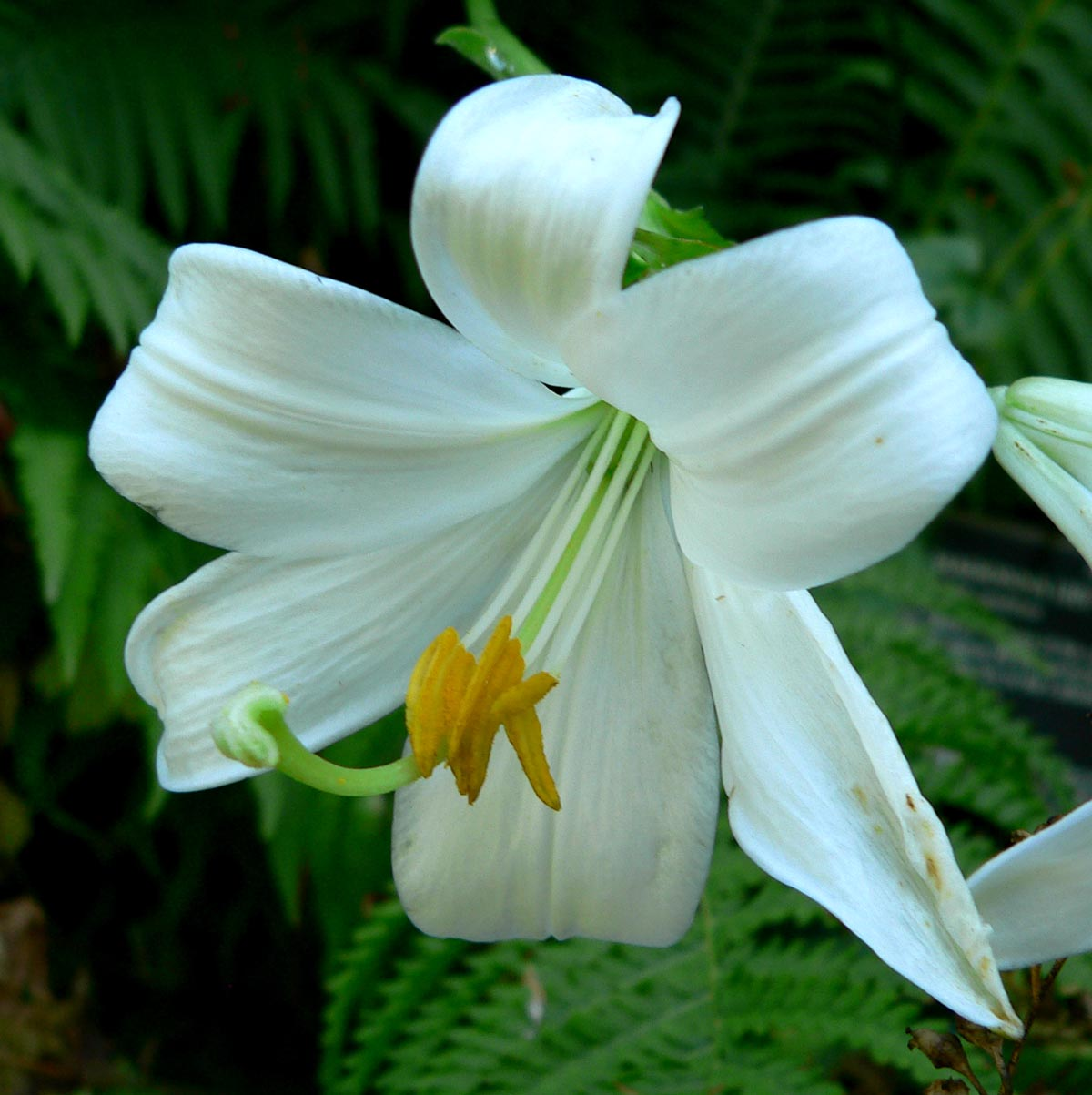
- Pronunciation: IPA: [aθuˈθena] or [asuˈsena]
- Gender: feminine
- Language: Spanish
- Name day: 15 August

Origin
- Language: Arabic
- Derivation: as-sawsan (السوسن)
- Meaning: "madonna lily" (symbolizing Mary, mother of Jesus)

Other names
- Pet names: Zuzu, Nene, Nena

Azucena is a Spanish surname and a feminine given name meaning "madonna lily", a flower that is a symbol of Mary, mother of Jesus.

Notable people with the name include:

== Given name ==
- Azucena Arbeleche (born 1970), Uruguayan economist, professor and civil servant
- Azucena Berrutti (born 1929), Uruguayan politician
- Azucena Díaz (born 1982), Spanish runner
- Azucena Galettini (born 1981), Argentine writer and translator
- Azucena Grajo Uranza (1929–2012), Filipino novelist
- Azucena Hernández (1960–2019), Spanish actress
- Azucena Maizani (1902–1970), Argentine tango singer, composer and actress
- Azucena Mora (born 1945), Ecuadorian actress
- Azucena Sánchez Benito (born 1978), Spanish cyclist
- Azucena Uresti (born 1978), Mexican journalist
- Azucena Vera-Perez (1917–2014), Filipino film producer
- Azucena Villaflor (1924–1977), Argentine social activist
- Norma Azucena Rodríguez Zamora, Mexican politician

== Surname ==
- Cesario Azucena (1938–2021), Filipino lawyer, professor, management consultant and author
- Gabriel Alberto Azucena (born 1988), known as Gawvi, American singer and music producer
- Kira Danganan-Azucena (born 1973), Filipino diplomat
- Maya Azucena, American singer-songwriter and cultural ambassador

== Fictional characters ==
- Azucena (gypsy), a character in Verdi's opera Il trovatore
- Azucena Milagros Ortiz Castillo, a character in the video game series Tekken
