= Zuleika (given name) =

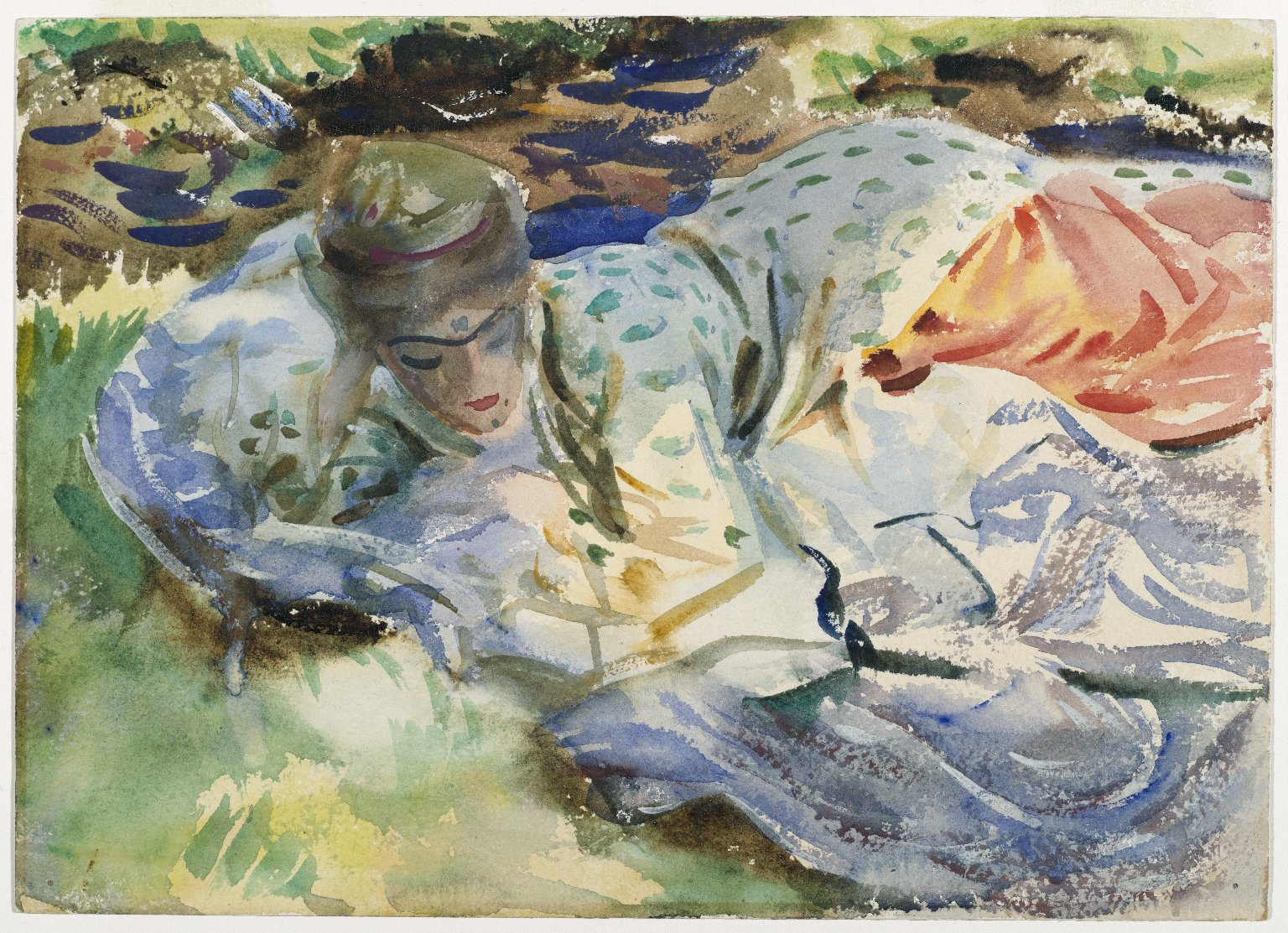
- Zuleika by John Singer Sargent, ca. 1906.
- Pronunciation: zoo-LAY-kə, zoo-LY-kə, zoo-LEE-kə
- Gender: Female
- Language: Arabic, Persian

Origin
- Meaning: “Beautiful”

Other names
- Related names: Suleika, Zuleikha, Zulaikha, Zuleica, Züleyha, Zuleyka, Zuleykha, Zuzu

Zuleika is a feminine given name. Variations of the name include Suleika, Zuleikha, Zulaikha, Zuleyka, Zuleica, Züleyha and Zuleykha. The name is of uncertain origin, possibly from Persian, meaning "brilliant beauty", or from Arabic, meaning "bright and fair", or from Turkish, meaning "water fairy". Zuzu is a nickname.

== Cultural associations ==
In Jewish tradition, Potiphar's wife tries to seduce her slave, Joseph, falsely accuses him of attempted rape, and has him imprisoned when he resists her sexual advances. In later Islamic poetic tradition, Zuleika has dreamed of a beautiful man since she was a young girl and falls passionately in love with the young man, who is called Yusuf in the Quran, when he is brought to her household as a slave. In some tales, Zuleika marries Yusuf after her first husband dies and Yusuf is freed, but her passion still remains unsatisfied. According to some interpretations, Zuleika’s passion for Yusuf is an allegory for man’s search for union with God.

== People ==
- Zulaikha Abu Risha (born 1942), Jordanian poet and activist
- Zuleika Alambert (1922–2012), Brazilian writer, feminist and politician
- Zuleika Bazhbeuk-Melikyan (born 1939), Armenian painter
- Zuleikha Chaudhuri, Indian 21st-century theatre director
- Zulekha Daud (fl. 1964–present), Indian physician and entrepreneur
- Zuleika Fuentes (born 1993), Puerto Rican handball player
- Suleika Ibáñez (1930-2013), Uruguayan writer, teacher, and translator
- Züleyxa "Zuzu" Izmailova (born 1985), Estonian-Azerbaijani journalist, environmental activist and politician
- Suleika Jaouad, American writer, advocate, and motivational speaker
- Zuleika Jess, Jamaican politician
- Zuzu Angel, born Zuleika Angel Jones (1921–1976), Brazilian fashion designer and activist
- Zuleika T. Lopez (born 1974), Filipina lawyer and government official
- Zulaikha Patel (born c. 2002), a South African girl who became a symbol of the fight against school policies about black girls' hair
- Zuleyka Rivera (born 1987), Puerto Rican actress
- Zuleikha Robinson (born 1977), British actress
- Zuleykha Safarova (born 1999), Azerbaijani tennis player
- Zuleykha Seyidmammadova (1919–1999), one of the first Azerbaijan female pilots and the first Azerbaijani woman to fly in combat
- Zuleyka Silver (born 1991), Mexican-American actress and fashion model
- Zuleika Soler (born 1994), Salvadoran model and beauty pageant titleholder
- Zuleika Suárez (born 1994), Colombian beauty pageant contestant
- Zuleikha Yunus Haji (born 1956), former Member of Parliament in the National Assembly of Tanzania
- Zuleyka Silver (born 1991), Mexican-American actress and model
- Zuleica Wilson (born 1993), Angolan model

== Biblical and fictional characters ==
- Zuleikha (tradition), Potiphar's wife in Jewish and Muslim tradition
- Zulaikha in Yusuf and Zulaikha, the Islamic version of the story of the prophet Joseph and Potiphar's wife
- Zuleika, heroine of the poem The Bride of Abydos (1813) by Byron
- Zuleika, heroine of the Book of Zuleika in the West–östlicher Divan (1819) by Goethe
- Zulejka, heroine of the narrative poem Sümeg vára (1858) by Alajos Balogh
- Title heroine of the 1911 novel Zuleika Dobson by Max Beerbohm
- Title character of Zuleika (musical), a musical based on the novel Zuleika Dobson
- Zuleika, heroine of the 2001 verse novel The Emperor's Babe by Bernardine Evaristo
- Title heroine of the 2005 Maldivian film Zuleykha
- Title heroine of the 2015 novel Zuleikha by Russian author Guzel Yakhina

== See also ==
- Zuleika (disambiguation)
