= Zuzu (given name) =

Given name

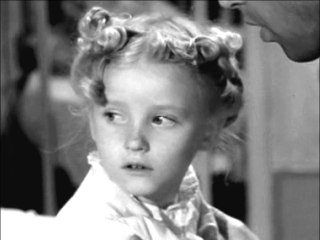
- Actress Karolyn Grimes portrayed Zuzu Bailey in the 1946 American Christmas classic film It's a Wonderful Life.
- Gender: Unisex

Origin
- Meaning: Hypocorism for various names

Other names
- Related names: Azucena, Susan, Zuleika, Zuzana

Zuzu is an independent given name and hypocorism for different names such as Azucena, Susan, Zuleika and their variants.

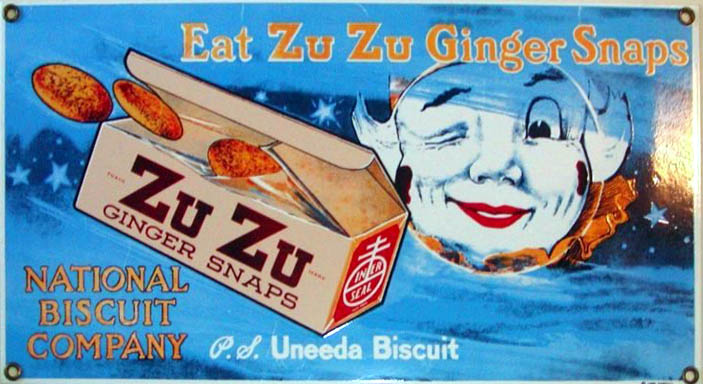
An early 1900s advertisement for Zu Zu Ginger Snaps.

In some instances, the nickname came from Zu Zu Ginger Snaps, a brand of ginger snap cookie popular in the United States in the 20th century. In the 1946 American Christmas supernatural drama film It's a Wonderful Life, protagonist George Bailey calls his youngest daughter "Zuzu, my little ginger snap." The iconic film character is best known for her line "Every time a bell rings, an angel gets his wings." The name has been in occasional, regular use as an independent feminine given name in the United States since the 1990s.

A.D. "Zuzu" Bollin (1923–1990), an American Texas blues guitarist and singer, took his nickname from Zu Zu Ginger Snaps, his favorite cookie.

== Women ==
- Zuleika "Zuzu" Angel (1921–1976), Brazilian fashion designer
- Züleyxa "Zuzu" Izmailova (born 1985), Estonian-Azerbaijani journalist, environmental activist and politician
- Zuzu Zakaria, Norwegian-Azerbaijani singer and producer (born c. 1980)

== Men ==
- A.D. "Zuzu" Bollin (1923–1990), American Texas blues guitarist and singer

== Stage name ==
- Zuzu Divine, ring name of Mexican professional wrestler Azucena Ángeles Flores (born 1994)

== Fiction ==
- Zuzu Bailey, the youngest daughter of hero George Bailey in the 1946 American Christmas supernatural drama film It's a Wonderful Life.
- Zuzu is a nickname given to Zuko by his sister Azula in the animated series Avatar: The Last Airbender.
