= Independent Spirit Award for Best Lead Performance in a New Scripted Series =

Annual US film award

- Presented by: Film Independent
- First award: Quinta Brunson; Abbott Elementary (2022)
- Final award: Stephen Graham; Adolescence (2025)
- Website: filmindependent.org

The Independent Spirit Award for Best Lead Performance in a New Scripted Series is one of the annual Independent Spirit Awards to honor an actor who has delivered an outstanding lead performance in a new scripted series.

In 2022, it was announced that the acting categories Best Female Performance in a New Scripted Series and Best Male Performance in a New Scripted Series would be retired and replaced with two gender neutral categories: Best Lead Performance in a New Scripted Series & Best Supporting Performance in a New Scripted Series.

== Winners and nominees ==
=== 2020s ===
Year	Nominees	Show	Role	Network
2022	Quinta Brunson	Abbott Elementary	Janine Teagues	ABC
2022	Aml Ameen	The Porter	Junior Massey	BET+ / CBC Television
2022	Mohammed Amer	Mo	Mo Najjar	Netflix
2022	Bridget Everett	Somebody Somewhere	Sam	HBO
2022	KaMillion	Rap Sh!t	Mia Knight	HBO Max
2022	Melanie Lynskey	Yellowjackets	Shauna Shipman	Showtime
2022	Himesh Patel	Station Eleven	Jeevan Chaudhary	HBO Max
2022	Sue Ann Pien	As We See It	Violet Wu	Prime Video
2022	Adam Scott	Severance	Mark Scout	Apple TV+
2022	Ben Whishaw	This Is Going to Hurt	Adam Kay	AMC+ / BBC One
2023	Ali Wong	Beef	Amy Lau	Netflix
2023	Emma Corrin	A Murder at the End of the World	Darby Hart	FX on Hulu
2023	Dominique Fishback	Swarm	Andrea "Dre" Greene	Prime Video
2023	Betty Gilpin	Mrs. Davis	Sister Simone	Peacock
2023	Jharrel Jerome	I'm a Virgo	Cootie	Prime Video
2023	Zoe Lister-Jones	Slip	Mae Cannon	The Roku Channel
2023	Bel Powley	A Small Light	Miep Gies	Nat Geo
2023	Bella Ramsey	The Last of Us	Ellie	HBO
2023	Ramón Rodríguez	Will Trent	Will Trent	ABC
2023	Steven Yeun	Beef	Danny Cho	Netflix
2024	Richard Gadd	Baby Reindeer	Donny Dunn	Netflix
2024	Brian Jordan Alvarez	English Teacher	Evan Marquez	FX
2024	Lily Gladstone	Under the Bridge	Cam Bentland	Hulu
2024	Kathryn Hahn	Agatha All Along	Agatha Harkness	Disney+
2024	Cristin Milioti	The Penguin	Sofia Falcone	HBO
2024	Julianne Moore	Mary & George	Mary Villiers	Starz
2024	Hiroyuki Sanada	Shōgun	Lord Yoshii Toranaga	FX
2024	Anna Sawai	Shōgun	Toda Mariko	FX
2024	Andrew Scott	Ripley	Tom Ripley	Netflix
2024	Julio Torres	Fantasmas	Julio Torres	HBO
2025	Stephen Graham	Adolescence	Eddie Miller	Netflix
2025	Sydney Chandler	Alien: Earth	Wendy	FX
2025	Ethan Hawke	The Lowdown	Lee Raybon	FX
2025	Lennie James	Mr Loverman	Barrington Jedidiah 'Barry' Walker	BBC One
2025	Anna Lambe	North of North	Siaja	CBC, / APTN / Netflix
2025	Lola Petticrew	Say Nothing	Dolours Price	FX on Hulu
2025	Seth Rogen	The Studio	Matt Remick	Apple TV
2025	Lovie Simone	Forever	Keisha Clark	Netflix
2025	Michelle Williams	Dying for Sex	Molly Kochan	FX on Hulu
2025	Noah Wyle	The Pitt	Dr. Michael "Robby" Robinavitch	HBO Max
