= Azucena =

Azucena may refer to:

- Azucena (name) (includes a list of people bearing that name)
- Azucena (TV series), a Venezuelan telenovela
- Azucena, Louisiana, a community in the United States
- Azucena, a gypsy, character in Verdi's opera Il trovatore
- Azucena or asocena, a euphemism and a play-on-words for the illegal dog meat trade in the Philippines
- Azucena (film), a 2000 Filipino drama film inspired by the illegal dog meat trade in the Philippines
- Azucena, a 2005 Romanian film directed by Mircea Mureșan

== See also ==
- Açucena
