= Independent Spirit Award for Best Supporting Performance in a New Scripted Series =

Annual US film award

- Presented by: Film Independent
- First award: Ayo Edebiri; The Bear (2022)
- Final award: Erin Doherty; Adolescence (2025)
- Website: filmindependent.org

The Independent Spirit Award for Best Supporting Performance in a New Scripted Series is one of the annual Independent Spirit Awards to honor an actor who has delivered an outstanding supporting performance in a new scripted series.

In 2022, it was announced that the acting categories Best Female Performance in a New Scripted Series and Best Male Performance in a New Scripted Series would be retired and replaced with two gender neutral categories: Best Lead Performance in a New Scripted Series and Best Supporting Performance in a New Scripted Series.

== Winners and nominees ==
=== 2020s ===
Year	Nominees	Show	Role	Network
2022	Ayo Edebiri	The Bear	Sydney Adamu	FX on Hulu
2022	Danielle Deadwyler	Station Eleven	Miranda Carroll	HBO Max
2022	Jeff Hiller	Somebody Somewhere	Joel	HBO
2022	Gbemisola Ikumelo	A League of Their Own	Clance Morgan	Prime Video
2022	Janelle James	Abbott Elementary	Ava Coleman	ABC
2022	Ebon Moss-Bachrach	The Bear	Richard "Richie" Jerimovich	FX on Hulu
2022	Frankie Quiñones	This Fool	Luis	Hulu
2022	Sheryl Lee Ralph	Abbott Elementary	Barbara Howard	ABC
2022	Molly Shannon	I Love That for You	Jackie Stilton	Showtime
2022	Tramell Tillman	Severance	Seth Milchick	Apple TV+
2023	Nick Offerman	The Last of Us	Bill	HBO
2023	Murray Bartlett	The Last of Us	Frank	HBO
2023	Billie Eilish	Swarm	Eva	Prime Video
2023	Jack Farthing	Rain Dogs	Selby	HBO
2023	Adina Porter	The Changeling	Lillian Kagwa	Apple TV+
2023	Lewis Pullman	Lessons in Chemistry	Calvin Evans	Apple TV+
2023	Benny Safdie	The Curse	Dougie Schecter	Showtime
2023	Luke Tennie	Shrinking	Sean	Apple TV+
2023	Olivia Washington	I'm a Virgo	Flora	Prime Video
2023	Jessica Williams	Shrinking	Gaby	Apple TV+
2024	Nava Mau	Baby Reindeer	Teri	Netflix
2024	Tadanobu Asano	Shōgun	Kashigi Yabushige	FX
2024	Enrico Colantoni	English Teacher	Grant Moretti	FX
2024	Betty Gilpin	Three Women	Lina	Starz
2024	Chloe Guidry	Under the Bridge	Josephine Bell	Hulu
2024	Moeka Hoshi	Shōgun	Usami Fuji	FX
2024	Stephanie Koenig	English Teacher	Gwen Sanders	FX
2024	Patti LuPone	Agatha All Along	Lilia Calderu	Disney+
2024	Ruth Negga	Presumed Innocent	Barbara Sabich	Apple TV+
2024	Brian Tee	Expats	Clarke Woo	Prime Video
2025	Erin Doherty	Adolescence	Briony Ariston	Netflix
2025	Ariyon Bakare	Mr Loverman	Morris De La Roux	BBC One
2025	Babou Ceesay	Alien: Earth	Morrow	FX
2025	Sharon D Clarke	Mr Loverman	Carmel Walker	BBC One
2025	Taylor Dearden	The Pitt	Dr. Melissa "Mel" King	HBO Max
2025	Stephen McKinley Henderson	A Man on the Inside	Calbert Graham	Netflix
2025	Poorna Jagannathan	Deli Boys	Naveeda "Lucky"	Hulu
2025	Xosha Roquemore	Forever	Shelly	Netflix
2025	Jenny Slate	Dying for Sex	Nikki Boyer	FX on Hulu
2025	Ben Whishaw	Black Doves	Sam Young	Netflix
