= Mr Loverman =

2013 novel by Bernardine Evaristo

- First edition
- Author: Bernardine Evaristo
- Language: English
- Publisher: Penguin (UK); Akashic Books (USA)
- Publication date: August 2013 (UK); April 2014 (USA)
- Publication place: United Kingdom
- Media type: Print (paperback)
- ISBN: 978-1617752896
- Preceded by: Hello Mum
- Followed by: Girl, Woman, Other

Mr Loverman is the seventh novel written by British-Nigerian author Bernardine Evaristo. Published by Penguin Books, UK, in 2013 and Akashic Books, US, in 2014, Mr Loverman explores the life of Britain's older Caribbean community, through the perspective of a 74-year-old Antiguan-Londoner and closet homosexual, and his wife Carmel whose voice we hear in alternate chapters.

== Reception ==
The novel was positively reviewed in The Guardian. In 2014, Mr Loverman won the Jerwood Uncovered Prize.

In 2024, Bernardine Evaristo wrote in The Guardian about how she created Barrington's Caribbean voice and that Carmel's chapters were added to the novel at a late stage after feedback from the publisher.

== TV adaptation ==
In June 2023, the BBC and Fable Pictures announced an adaptation of the novel into an eight-part television series. The series began broadcasting on 14 October 2024, and starred Lennie James, Ariyon Bakare and Sharon D. Clarke. In 2025, Lennie James won a BAFTA and the Royal Televsion Society Programme Award for his leading role. The BAFTA for supporting actor was awarded to Ariyon Bakare in the same year.

== Theatre adaptation ==
A 2027 theatre adaptation has been announced to run between 25 February and 24 April 2027 at the Lyttelton Theatre, National Theatre in London, UK, featuring Danny Sapani as Barrington and Gary Beadle as Morris, directed by Paulette Randall, in an adaptation by Natasha Gordon of Bernardine Evaristo's acclaimed novel.
