= Zuleika =

According to Jewish, Christian, and Islamic tradition, Zuleikha (also spelled Zuleika, Zuleykha, or Suleika) was the name of Potiphar's wife. These names may also refer to:

- Zuleika (given name), a list of people and fictional characters
- 563 Suleika, a minor planet orbiting the Sun
- Suleika Jaouad, an American writer and motivational speaker
- Zuleika Dobson, a novel by Max Beerbohm
- Zuleika (musical), a 1954 musical based on the novel Zuleika Dobson
- Zuleikha (novel), the 2015 debut novel of Guzel Yakhina
- Zuleykha, a 2005 Maldivian romantic drama film
- Zuleika (moth), a genus of moths in the family Geometridae
- Zuleika, a New Zealand sloop which foundered during the Storm of 1897 with the loss of 12 lives

== See also ==
- Yusuf and Zulaikha, the story of Joseph and Potiphar's wife in Islam
