= Eltham Hill School =

Location
- Eltham Hill; Eltham, Greater London, SE9 5EE; England
- Coordinates: 51°27′04″N 0°02′46″E

Information
- Type: Community school Comprehensive school
- Local authority: Greenwich
- Department for Education URN: 100182 Tables
- Ofsted: Reports
- Principal: Erika Podmore
- Gender: Girls
- Age: 11 to 19
- Enrolment: 1,168 as of December 2022
- Website: http://elthamhill.com

Eltham Hill School is a comprehensive secondary school for girls, and a mixed sixth form. It is located in the Eltham area of the Royal Borough of Greenwich in London, England.

== History ==
=== Grammar school ===
The school was founded as Eltham Hill Grammar School for Girls on 18 September 1906. It was known as the County Secondary School Eltham, and was housed in the building now occupied by Deansfield School. The first intake of pupils was numbered 40, and over the next few years, the school grew rapidly. In 1909, the first pupil gained entry to University, and in 1919 a party visited Paris on the first school journey. By 1912 the school was full, with almost 200 pupils; however, The Great War brought permanent changes to Eltham.

=== Comprehensive ===
A comprehensive education system was adopted in Greenwich Borough, with the school becoming comprehensive in 1974. The school became a specialist Technology College for a time and was renamed Eltham Hill Technology College, before the Eltham Hill School name was readopted. Today, it is a community school administered by Greenwich London Borough Council.

Eltham Hill School offers GCSEs and BTECs as programmes of study for pupils. Students in the sixth form have the option of studying from a range of A Levels, the International Baccalaureate and the IBCP.

== Notable former pupils ==
=== Eltham Hill Grammar School for Girls ===
- Sara Coward, actress who played Caroline Sterling/Pemberton/Bone in The Archers
- Anne Dudley, composer of film scores, music producer and arranger, played with the Art of Noise
- Bernardine Evaristo OBE FRSL FRSA, Booker Prize-winning writer, Professor of Creative Writing, Brunel University of London and President of the Royal Society of Literature (2022-2025)
- Trudie Goodwin, actress in The Bill
- Sheila Noakes, Baroness Noakes, Conservative politician and former corporate executive
- Edith Summerskill, physician, feminist, Labour MP from 1938-55 for Fulham West, and from 1955-61 for Warrington, Minister of National Insurance from February 1950 to October 1951
- Ruth Williams Khama, was the wife of Botswana's first president Sir Seretse Khama; she served as the inaugural First Lady of Botswana from 1966 to 1980.
