= Açucena =

City in the Brazilian state of Minas Gerais

Coordinates: 19°04′S 42°32′W

- Municipality
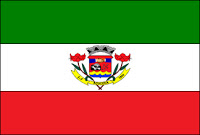
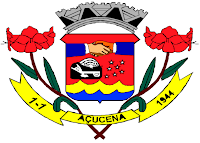
- Flag Coat of arms
- Interactive map of Açucena
- Country: Brazil
- State: Minas Gerais
- Region: Southeast

Population (2022 Census)
  - Total: 8,943
  - Estimate (2025): 8,926
- Time zone: UTC−3 (BRT)

Location of Açucena

Açucena is a city in the Brazilian state of Minas Gerais. In 2025 its population was estimated to be 8,926.

== See also ==
- List of municipalities in Minas Gerais
- Azucena (disambiguation)
