= Black Womantalk =

Black British publishing cooperative

Black Womantalk was a British publishing cooperative of women of African and Asian descent founded in 1983.

== History ==
Based in London, England, Black Womantalk was "set up in 1983 by a group of unemployed Black women of African and Asian descent who felt strongly about creating the space and the means for our voices to be heard." Originally there were eight members, including Olivette Cole Wilson and Bernardine Evaristo. By 1989, there were three members: Cole Wilson, Da Choong, and Gabriela Pearse.

Most of Black WomanTalk's effort went into organising open readings and workshops for Black women writers. They also released two anthologies of Black women's writing: a 1987 poetry anthology entitled Black Women Talk Poetry, and a 1991 short story anthology, Don't Ask Me Why.

== Publications ==
- Black Womantalk, Da Choong, Olivette Cole Wilson, Bernardine Evaristo and Gabriela Pearce, eds., Black Women Talk Poetry. London: Black Womantalk Cooperative, 1987. ISBN 9780399144462
- Da Choong, Olivette Cole Wilson and Sylvia Parker (eds.) Don't Ask Me Why: An Anthology of Short Stories by Black Women. London: Black Womantalk Press, 1991; ISBN 9781870400015
