= Sheila Noakes, Baroness Noakes =

British Conservative politician (born 1949)

The Right Honourable The Baroness Noakes DBE

Member of the House of Lords
- Lord Temporal
- Life peerage 7 June 2000

Personal details
- Born: 23 June 1949 (age 77)
- Party: Conservative
- Education: University of Bristol

Sheila Valerie Noakes, Baroness Noakes, DBE (née Masters, born 23 June 1949) is a British Conservative politician and former corporate executive.

== Education and early career ==
Sheila Masters was educated at Eltham Hill Grammar School, followed by the University of Bristol, where she studied Law. She qualified as a Chartered Accountant and became a partner in Peat Marwick Mitchell & Co, which is now part of KPMG. For three years from 1988, she was seconded to the National Health Service where she modernised its financial management.

In 1999 she became the first female President of the Institute of Chartered Accountants in England and Wales. At the same time, she was a non-executive director of the Bank of England and a governor of the London Business School, while still overseeing privatisations and other public sector work at KPMG. Trade journal Accountancy Age described her as "the country's most high profile accountant".

== Political career ==
Baroness Noakes was the Opposition spokesperson for the Treasury (2003–2010), Work and Pensions (2001–2006) and Health (2001–2003). In January 2006 she moved, with Lord Phillips, an amendment to the Identity Cards bill which led to it being defeated in the House of Lords and sent back to the House of Commons.

She is a co-director of the Reuters Founders Share Company and the British carpet retailer, CarpetRight. She was made a Non Executive Director at RBS in August 2011.

== Honours ==
She was appointed a Dame Commander of the Order of the British Empire (DBE) in the 1996 Birthday Honours. She was created a life peer as Baroness Noakes, of Goudhurst in the County of Kent on 7 June 2000.
