= Hello Mum =

2010 novella by Bernardine Evaristo

- First edition
- Author: Bernardine Evaristo
- Language: English
- Publisher: Penguin UK
- Publication date: March 2010
- Publication place: United Kingdom
- Media type: Print (paperback)
- ISBN: 978-0141044385
- Preceded by: Blonde Roots
- Followed by: Mr Loverman

Hello Mum is a novella written by British-Nigerian author Bernardine Evaristo. Published by Penguin Books in 2010, this epistolary novella explores London gang culture from the viewpoint of a 14-year-old boy, Jerome, who communicates with his mother through letters. In 2010, Hello Mum was chosen as Suffolk's Big Quick Read and adapted into a BBC Radio 4 play in 2012.

== Reception ==
=== Reviews ===
In the year of the book's publication, more than 40,000 copies of Hello Mum were distributed to schools as part of Suffolk's Big Read, and 70,000 copies have been sold to date. As a Quick Read, it was not formally reviewed. However, students from Holywell School commented: "I think Hello Mum is an excellent story. I don't normally like reading but I enjoyed reading this book" and "I think it is really helpful to teenagers because it is true and can relate to what is going on in their lives". It was also well received by members of Haleworth Library who described it as "an amazing and terrifyingly accurate piece of social history. An excellent fast-paced piece of writing – and oh so sad. Brilliant for reluctant readers" and "a very sad story of how gang culture can blight the life of a young boy. I liked Jerome and his little touches of humour. The book gives a disturbing account of daily life in some parts of cities." Evaristo's novella has further been described as an intergenerational piece of fiction that is "thought provoking for all age groups, but especially the young. A story that bridges the Generation Gap!"

=== Honours and awards ===
- 2010: Hello Mum was chosen as Suffolk's Big Quick Read

== Bibliography ==
- Hello Mum, a novella (Penguin UK, 2010; ISBN 978-0141044385)
