= Theatre of Black Women =

British theatre company

Theatre of Black Women (1982–1988) was Britain's first black women's theatre company. It was founded by Bernardine Evaristo, Patricia Hilaire and Paulette Randall upon leaving the Rose Bruford College of Speech and Drama, where they had trained as actors and theatre-makers on the Community Theatre Arts course from 1979 to 1982. The course was a progressive, innovative drama course aimed at producing individuals who would be equipped to create their own theatre and be a force for change in society. The company, based in London, was forced to disband in 1988 when Arts Council funding ceased.

== Productions ==
Theatre of Black Women's aim was to produce plays by and about black British women at a time when parts for black women were almost non-existent in theatre. Their first three short one-woman plays were initially staged at the Royal Court Theatre as part of their Young Writers Season in 1982. These were Evaristo's Tiger, Teeth Clenched Not To Bite, Hilaire's Hey Brown Girl and Randall's Chameleon. The pieces were also taken to the 1982 international women's theatre festival at the Melkweg in Amsterdam, Holland.

Other plays included Silhouette by Evaristo and Hilaire; Pyeyucca, by Evaristo with additional material by Hilaire; Chiaroscuro by Jackie Kay, and Miss Quashie and the Tiger's Tail, a children's play by mother-and-daughter team Gabriela and Jean Pearse. The company primarily toured the UK with some appearances in Europe. Women who worked with the company include Joan Ann Maynard, who directed Chiaroscuro, and Gail Ann Dorsey, who composed the music for Chiaroscuro.

In addition to producing theatre, the company ran drama workshops for young black women nationally and in Europe.

== Reception ==
Theatre of Black Women was well received. In Spare Rib magazine 138, Maxine stated that during Silhouette, "on a Spartan stage the two women resurrect from silence and invisibility some of the history and experiences unique to the lives of Black women... An evocative language of poetry is used by the characters to explore the many subjects, which in different ways permeate both their lives" (January 1984). Listed in the 145th edition of Spare Rib in August 1984, Pyeyucca also received positive reviews, as 'it explores black woman and self-image and examines the ways the black woman has been portrayed through the media and how these stereotypes have their mark on black women today. We ask the question to what extent we have absorbed white society’s and the black male’s definition of ourselves and how do we fight against the life-long conditioning that has us so narrowly defined.’ As a result, Pyeyucca has been described as "the rebel black spirit. She haunts Laura without rest: at home, through conformity at school, through the corridors of the ‘special school’ where Laura is sent when her divided psyche can no longer cope. And finally she liberates her. To what? We do not know and cannot imagine. The point of Pyeyucca lies not in pragmatic details but in the wanting – the trapped black desire for liberation."
