= Manifesto: On Never Giving Up =

2022 memoir by Bernardine Evaristo

- Author: Bernardine Evaristo
- Language: English
- Subject: Memoir
- Publisher: Grove Press
- Publication date: January 18, 2022
- Pages: 224
- ISBN: 978-0-8021-5890-1

Manifesto: On Never Giving Up is a 2022 memoir by Bernardine Evaristo.

Evaristo’s first non-fiction book, Manifesto: On Never Giving Up, is a memoir about growing up in a working-class, mixed-race family in 1960s Britain to founding Britain's first Black women's theatre company in the 1980s and her historic 2019 Booker Prize win. She looks at her creativity through the prism of her heritage and life.

The heart of the book is about tenacity. Evaristo tackles topics such as race, class, feminism, sexuality and aging. Readers are encouraged to be unstoppable in the face of marginalization through self-discipline, maintaining a positive mental attitude and viewing setbacks as stepping stones.

It is published by Hamish Hamilton, Penguin Books UK (7 October 2021) & Grove Press (January 2022). And Brazil (Companhia das Letras), France (Globe), Germany (Tropen), Greece (Dardanos), Netherlands (De Geus), Spain (Alianza) & other countries/languages.

== Awards ==
- 2022: Visionary Honours Book of the Year 2021 (finalist)
- 2023: Prix des Libraires du Québec, Canada (finalist)
- 2023: Grand Prix des Lecteurs, France (finalist)
- 2024: Praeses Elit Award, Trinity College Dublin

== Recognition ==
1. Times Book of the Year
2. Sunday Times Book of the Year
3. Apple Books, Best 15 Books of 2021
4. Waterstones Best Book of 2021
5. Daunts Book of the Year 2021
6. Stylist Best Book for Christmas 2021
7. Woman & Home Best Books of 2021
8. Time Most Anticipated Book 2021
9. Time 100 Must-Read Book of 2022
10. Kirkus Reviews 40 Most Ancipated Books 2022
11. Washington Post 10 Noteworthy Books for January 2022
12. Entertainment Weekly – 5 Must-Read Books for January
13. New York Times – Editor’s Choice
14. New Statesman Book of the Year, 2022
15. Kirkus Best Multicultural Book of 2022
