= Lara (novel) =

1997 novel by Bernardine Evaristo

- First edition (1997)
- Author: Bernardine Evaristo
- Language: English
- Publisher: Bloodaxe Books/Angela Royal Publishing
- Publication date: May 1997/October 2009
- Publication place: United Kingdom
- Media type: Print (paperback)
- ISBN: 9781852248314
- Followed by: The Emperor's Babe

Lara is a semi-autobiographical novel-in-verse written by Bernardine Evaristo. It was originally published in 1997 by Angela Royal Publishing and won the EMMA Best Book Award in 1999. Drawing on family life, childhood and an inter-racial marriage, Lara explores the struggles of London living in the 1960s and '70s, travelling through seven generations of predecessors, spanning over 150 years to follow their lives in England, Nigeria, Ireland, Germany and Brazil. In 2009 a new, revised and expanded edition was published by Bloodaxe Books, with a photograph of the author's parents on their wedding day in Camberwell, London, 1955, as the cover.

== Reviews ==
Evaristo's Lara was voted Book of the Year three times. The New Statesman said: "first novels don't often make my heart beat faster….Bernardine Evaristo is a gifted black writer. Her Lara is a beautifully written novel-in-verse", while Black British newspaper The Weekly Journal praised her "skill as a storyteller as well as a poet, Lara is a work that is finely crafted in both detail and delivery."

== Honours and awards ==
- New Statesman Book of the Year
- Telegraph Book of the Year
- Weekly Journal Book of the Year
- 1999: EMMA Best Book Award for Lara

== Bibliography ==
- Lara (Angela Royal Publishing, 1997; ISBN 9781899860456)
- Lara – new, expanded edition (Bloodaxe Books, 2009; ISBN 978-1852248314)
