= Blonde Roots =

2009 satirical prose novel by Bernardine Evaristo

- First edition (UK)
- Author: Bernardine Evaristo
- Language: English
- Publisher: Hamish Hamilton/Penguin (UK) & Riverhead/Penguin (USA)
- Publication date: April 2009 (UK), January 2010 (US)
- Publication place: United Kingdom
- Media type: Print (Paperback)
- ISBN: 978-0141031521
- Preceded by: Soul Tourists
- Followed by: Hello Mum

Blonde Roots is a novel by British-Nigerian author Bernardine Evaristo. Published by Penguin UK in 2009 and Penguin USA in 2010, this satirical novel presents an alternative history of the transatlantic slavery, with Africans as the masters of European slaves. In 2009, it was awarded the Orange Prize Youth Panel Choice and the Big Red Read Award.

== Plot ==
Set in an alternative, quasi-dystopian present, Blonde Roots describes a world in which "whyte Europanes" are routinely enslaved by "blak Aphrikans" and made to serve wealthy blak families, or to work the plantations on the fictional island of Great Ambossa.

The novel comprises three sections, two narrated by an enslaved whyte girl, Doris, one by her wealthy and privileged master, Chief Kaga Konata Katamba I.

Throughout the novel, the reader follows the protagonist and principal narrator, Doris Scagglethorpe (whose slave name is Omorenomwara). Kidnapped as a child from a family of cabbage-growing serfs in the north of England and transported to Great Ambossa, abused and dehumanized by her owners, she finally attempts to escape and return to her family. Sent to the cane plantations as punishment, Doris joins a community formed by generations of whyte slaves, and with their help, plans another escape attempt.

== Themes ==
The novel is preceded by a quotation from Nietzsche: "Whichever interpretation prevails at a given time is a function of power and not truth." The novel deals with themes of race and power, and "the ...irreversible effects of racism", reminding us "...that 'us' and ‘them’ could so easily have been reversed, and that regarding someone as less than fully human is the root of all tyranny."

== Language ==
With a title that has been linked to Alex Haley’s 1976 novel Roots, Blonde Roots is Evaristo's first novel written entirely in prose. Language in the novel is used partly as a source of humour: Europa is referred to as "the Grey Continent", with its "Coal and Cabbage Coasts", and Evaristo re-invents the slaves' patois as a "skipping vernacular", while the section of the book narrated by the slave owner was based on "documents and primary sources from the archives of 18th century slaveholders".

== Reception ==
=== Reviews ===
Blonde Roots was widely reviewed and well-received on release. The Independent called it (Evaristo's): "boldest step to date" and praised "its bittersweet, riotous humour". The Guardian spoke of the "musicality and exuberance" of Evaristo's prose, and Publishers Weekly in the US stated: "Evaristo delivers an astonishing, uncomfortable and beautiful alternative history."

=== Honours and awards ===
- 2009: International Dublin Literary Award, nominated
- 2009: Orange Prize for Fiction, nominated
- 2009: Orange Prize Youth Panel Choice (winner)
- 2009: Arthur C. Clarke Award, nominated

== Publication information ==
- Blonde Roots (Hamish Hamilton/Penguin, 2008; Riverhead/Penguin, USA, 2009, ISBN 978-0141031521)
