= Soul Tourists =

2005 novel by Bernardine Evaristo

- First edition
- Author: Bernardine Evaristo
- Language: English
- Publisher: Hamish Hamilton
- Publication date: June 2005
- Publication place: United Kingdom
- Media type: Print (hardback)
- ISBN: 978-0140297829
- Preceded by: The Emperor's Babe
- Followed by: Blonde Roots

Soul Tourists is an experimental novel written by British writer Bernardine Evaristo. Published in 2005 by Penguin, Soul Tourists draws on elements of prose, poetry, scripts and other non-fiction devices. Featuring historical figures of the past, the novel tells the story of a mismatched black British couple travelling from Europe to the Middle East.

== Reception ==
=== Reviews ===
Soul Tourists was named Book of the Year by The Independent and The Independent on Sunday and described as "a rollercoaster road movie in print where the language twists and turns more than a path through the Pyrenees. Evaristo crosses the border between prose, poetry and film script and exposes the hidden face of black European history in the process."

=== Honours and awards ===
- Independent Book of the Year
- Independent on Sunday Book of the Year

== Bibliography ==
- Soul Tourists (Hamish Hamilton), 2005; ISBN 978-0140297829)
