= Mr Loverman (TV series) =

British television series

- Genre: Drama
- Based on: Mr Loverman by Bernardine Evaristo
- Written by: Nathaniel Price
- Directed by: Hong Khaou
- Starring: Lennie James
- Music by: Speakers Corner Quartet Raven Bush
- Country of origin: United Kingdom
- Original language: English
- No. of series: 1
- No. of episodes: 8

Production
- Executive producers: Lennie James; Hong Khaou; Jo McCellan; Faye Ward; Hannah Farrell; Hannah Price
- Producer: Irma Inniss
- Cinematography: Remi Adefarasin
- Editors: Kim Gaster; Emma Oxley; Abolfazl Talooni
- Production company: Fable Pictures

Original release
- Network: BBC One
- Release: 14 October – 4 November 2024

Mr Loverman is a British television drama series based on the novel of the same name by Bernardine Evaristo and stars Lennie James in the lead role. James won Best Leading Actor at the Royal Television Society Programme Awards in March 2025.

== Synopsis ==
Antiguan-born Londoner Barrington Jedidiah Walker (James) has his marriage collapse after a decades-long affair with his male best friend is revealed.

== Cast and characters ==
- Lennie James as Barrington Jedidiah 'Barry' Walker
- Ariyon Bakare as Morris De La Roux
- Sharon D Clarke as Carmel Walker
- Tamara Lawrance as Maxine Walker
- Sharlene Whyte as Donna Walker
- Suzette Llewellyn as Odette De La Roux
- Lochlann Ó Mearáin as Reuben Dempsey
- Tahj Miles as Daniel Walker
- Keenan Munn-Francis as Young Barry
- Gabin Kongolo as Young Morris
- Lauren Akosia as Carmelita

== Production ==
In June 2023, it was announced that Lennie James was to star and executive produce the eight-part series Mr Loverman for BBC One, based on the novel of the same name by Bernardine Evaristo. It is adapted by Nathaniel Price and the director is Hong Khaou. The series' score was developed by Speakers Corner Quartet.

=== Filming ===
Filming began in October 2023. Filming locations included the island of Antigua (Antigua and Barbuda) in the Caribbean, as well as Queen's Park, London.

== Reception ==
The series had its world premiere at the 2024 Tribeca Film Festival on 14 June 2024, and was broadcast in the UK on 14 October 2024.

The series was praised by critics: The Guardian's Lucy Mangan described it as "magnificent", calling James and Clarke's performances "exquisite". Writing for The Independent, Nick Hilton praised the show's "almost theatrical quality", observing James "is as good as he’s ever been" while also lauding Bakare's performance, concluding that the programme represented "a slim but moving testament to the enduring power of self-acceptance."

Gabriel Tate of The Daily Telegraph called the show "fantastic", awarding its final episode five stars out of five, while Abby Robinson for the Radio Times was more indifferent, giving the programme three stars out of five, but acknowledging that it was "both refreshing and vital" work.

== Accolades ==
Year	Award	Category	Nominee(s)	Result	Ref.
2025	Royal Television Society Programme Awards	Leading Actor: Male	Lennie James	Won	
2025	British Academy Television Awards	Best Actor	Lennie James	Won	
2025	British Academy Television Awards	Best Actress	Sharon D. Clarke	Nominated	
2025	British Academy Television Awards	Best Supporting Actor	Ariyon Bakare	Won	
2026	Film Independent Spirit Awards	Best New Scripted Series	Lennie James, Hong Khaou, Jo McClellan, Faye Ward, Hannah Farrell, Hannah Price	Nominated	
2026	Film Independent Spirit Awards	Best Lead Performance in a New Scripted Series	Lennie James	Nominated	
2026	Film Independent Spirit Awards	Best Supporting Performance in a New Scripted Series	Ariyon Bakare	Nominated	
2026	Film Independent Spirit Awards	Best Supporting Performance in a New Scripted Series	Sharon D. Clarke	Nominated	
