= The Emperor's Babe =

2001 verse novel by Bernardine Evaristo

- First edition (UK)
- Author: Bernardine Evaristo
- Language: English
- Publisher: Hamish Hamilton/Penguin (UK), Penguin (USA)
- Publication date: January 2001 (UK), April 2002 (USA)
- Publication place: United Kingdom
- Media type: Print (hardback/paperback)
- ISBN: 978-0140297812
- Preceded by: Lara
- Followed by: Soul Tourists

The Emperor's Babe is a verse novel written by British author Bernardine Evaristo. Published by Penguin in 2001, it is Evaristo's second work of fiction. Based in London around 1800 years ago, it follows the story of black Nubian teenage girl, Zuleika, who comes of age in the Roman period. The Emperor's Babe won the Arts Council Writers Award in 2000, a NESTA Fellowship Award in 2003 and was chosen by The Times as one of the 100 Best Books of the Decade in 2010. In 2013, it was also adapted into a BBC Radio 4 play.

== Reception ==
=== Reviews ===
The Bookseller described The Emperor's Babe as "something completely different: a fresh and original historical novel, narrated in verse". The Guardian also praised the form of the verse-novel and called it "adventurous, compelling and utterly original. You won’t read another book like it this year."

=== Honours and awards ===
- 2013: The Times 100 Best Books of the Decade
- 2003: NESTA Fellowship Award
- 2000: The Arts Council of England Writers Award
- Sunday Times Pick of the Week and Book of the Year
- Telegraph Book of the Year
- Sunday Independent Book of the Year
- Ireland Sunday Independent Book of the Year
- Red Magazine Pick of the Paperbacks
- Times Best of Summer Books

== Bibliography ==
- The Emperor's Babe (Hamish Hamilton/Penguin, 2001; Penguin USA, 2002, ISBN 978-0140297812)
