= Norma Azucena Rodríguez Zamora =

Mexican politician

Federal Deputy of the Congress of the Union
- Incumbent
- Assumed office 1 September 2018
- Preceded by: Candelario Pérez Alvarado

Personal details
- Party: PRD
- Occupation: Engineer

Norma Azucena Rodríguez Zamora is a Mexican politician affiliated with the Party of the Democratic Revolution. She was elected to the LXIV Legislature of the Mexican Congress as a federal deputy representing the state of Veracruz from the third electoral region.

== Political career ==
Rodríguez Zamora served as a city councilor (regidora) of Tihuatlán between 2014 and 2017.

In 2018, the PRD placed Rodríguez first on its party list from the third electoral region, all but guaranteeing her a seat in the Chamber of Deputies.

== Kidnapping ==
On 15 August 2018, it was reported that she was kidnapped at gunpoint. According to reports, Rodríguez was traveling on a highway in Hidalgo, when two gunmen shot at her car, injuring an assistant and driver, and causing the car to overturn. The gunmen then pulled Rodríguez out from her car and forced her into their vehicle. The next day the newspaper Milenio reported that she had been safely returned to relatives, unharmed except for an injury to her arm sustained when her vehicle overturned. The newspaper could not determine whether a ransom had been paid.

== See also ==
- List of kidnappings
