= Paulette Randall =

British theatre director (born 1961)

Paulette Randall MBE
- Born: 1961 (age 64–65); London, England
- Education: Rose Bruford College of Speech and Drama
- Occupation: Theatre director
- Known for: Associate director of 2012 Summer Olympics opening ceremony

Paulette Randall, MBE (born 1961) is a British theatre director of Jamaican descent. She was chair of the board of Clean Break Theatre Company in 2006–07, and is former artistic director of Talawa Theatre Company. She was the associate director for the opening ceremony of the London 2012 Olympics.

== Biography ==
Paulette Randall was born in south London to Jamaican parents. She attended Saint Jude's Primary and Dick Shepherd Secondary School in Brixton. When she was 11, she started helping out in a shop on Saturdays and she has said: "It was working in Brixton market that was my real first understanding of theatre, just the characters you met and stories you heard." She subsequently went to drama school at the age of 18, training to be an actress at the Rose Bruford College of Speech and Drama. After graduating in 1982, she and two fellow students – Bernardine Evaristo and Patricia Hilaire – set up their own company, called Theatre of Black Women, in response to the lack of roles for black actors at the time.

She was Associate Director of the 2012 Summer Olympics opening ceremony, working alongside Danny Boyle. According to London's Evening Standard: "Knowing her theatrical pedigree – Randall, 49, has directed August Wilson's plays, which celebrate the African American experience and is a former artistic director of black theatre company, Talawa; her TV credits include Desmond's (Channel 4) and The Real McCoy (BBC2) – makes you wonder whether she can claim credit for the multicultural flavour of the show."

In 2013, Randall became the first female black director to bring a production to London's West End with August Wilson's Fences, starring Lenny Henry, at the Duchess Theatre.

== Awards and recognition ==
Randall was appointed an MBE in 2015 for services to drama, and was awarded an honorary degree from Brunel University in the same year.

In 2016, she was given a lifetime achievement award for her work as a director and playwright in film and TV at the inaugural WOW Creative Industries Awards, presented by the Women of the World Festival at the Southbank Centre.

== Selected projects ==
Royal Court Theatre

- Directed Blest Be the Tie by Doña Daley (2004). "Daley's concerns emerge naturally through her characters rather than hammering an agenda, and director Paulette Randall (whose Talawa company here co-produces with the Royal Court) gets her cast – Marion Bailey, Lorna Gayle and Ellen Thomas – to turn in performances which all engage in different ways."
- Directed What's in the Cat by Linda Brogan (2005). "What's in the Cat is painfully slow for its first 45 minutes but once the knives are drawn, picks up to become a fascinating kitchen sink drama about the life of a highly volatile, mixed-race family in Manchester in the 1970s."

Other theatres

- Directed Urban Afro Saxons (2003). "Talawa's latest production is subtitled 'What Makes You British?' and is a timely contribution to the controversial debate spawned not only by Blunkett's proposed citizenship tests but the burning questions raised by racism in the police force."
- Directed Blues for Mister Charlie, by James Baldwin, 2004, a co-production between Talawa and the New Wolsey Theatre, at the Tricycle Theatre. "Blues For Mr Charlie may last for around three hours but the tension never drops. It would make a tremendous contribution to any debate on racism and its most terrifying facet is that it is set merely a generation ago."
- Directed Gem of the Ocean, by August Wilson (2003, Los Angeles; 2004, New York; 2006, London). "...the scene is brilliantly staged, complete with chanting and gospel singing, as it re-enacts a slave-ship journey back to the African ancestral home."
- Directed Fences, by August Wilson, starring Lenny Henry, at the Duchess Theatre (19 June–14 September 2013).

Television

- Produced Desmond's (1989).
- Produced Porkpie (1995).
- Produced the second series of The Crouches (2004–05). "The first series of this sitcom wasn't seen by many and was critically mauled by the press, the BBC gave it a second chance and used new writers for series 2."
