= Bernardine Evaristo =

English author and academic (born 1959)

Bernardine Evaristo OBE FRSL FRSA
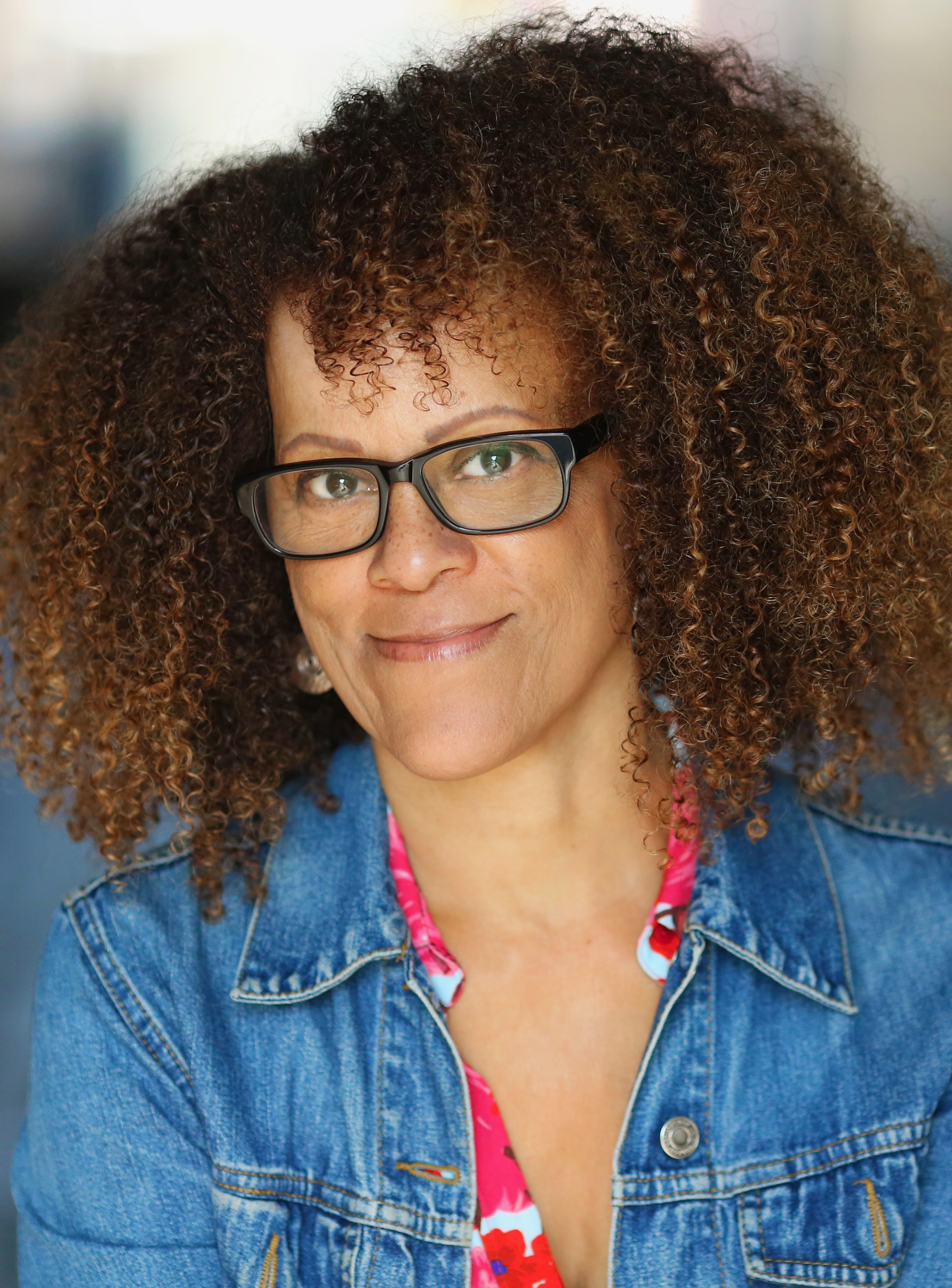
- Evaristo in 2018
- Born: Bernardine Anne Mobolaji Evaristo; 28 May 1959 (age 67); Eltham, London, England
- Education: Eltham Hill Grammar School for Girls; Rose Bruford College of Speech and Drama; Goldsmiths College, University of London
- Occupations: Novelist, critic, poet, playwright, academic
- Notable work: Lara (1997); The Emperor's Babe (2001); Girl, Woman, Other (2019)
- Spouse: David Shannon
- Awards: Booker Prize, 2019; Indie Book Award for Fiction 2020; British Book Awards: Fiction and Author of the Year 2020; Women's Prize Outstanding Contribution Award (2025)
- Website: bevaristo.com

Bernardine Anne Mobolaji Evaristo (born 28 May 1959) is an English author and Professor of Creative Writing at Brunel University of London. She is Visiting Professor of Creative Media 2025/6 at the University of Oxford. Her novel Girl, Woman, Other jointly won the Booker Prize in 2019 alongside Margaret Atwood's The Testaments, making her the first black woman to win the Booker. (Note: "I identify as a Black woman." "How quickly and casually they have removed my name from history – the first black woman to win it. This is what we've always been up against, folks.") The novel won many other awards including two British Book awards (a.k.a. "Nibbies"). In 2025, Evaristo was selected from among all previous Women's Prize for Fiction winners and nominees as the recipient of the Women's Prize Outstanding Contribution Award, a one-off literary honour to celebrate the 30th anniversary of the Women's Prize for Fiction. She served for four years as President of the Royal Society of Literature, the second woman and the first Black or Asian person to hold the role since it was founded in 1820. She was elected President Emerita once her tenure was completed in 2025.

Evaristo is a longstanding advocate and activist for the inclusion of writers and artists. She co-founded Spread the Word writer development agency with Ruth Borthwick (1995–present) and Britain's first black women's theatre company (1982–1988), Theatre of Black Women. Evaristo organised Britain's first major black theatre conference, Future Histories, for the Black Theatre Forum (1995), at the Royal Festival Hall, and Britain's first major conference on black British writing, Tracing Paper (1997), at the Museum of London. Evaristo founded the Brunel International African Poetry Prize, 2012–2022, which in 2023 became the Evaristo African Poetry Prize with the African Poetry Book Fund, and she founded The Complete Works mentoring scheme for poets of colour, 2007–2017. In 2021 she founded the Sky Arts Mentoring Award for writers with the Royal Society of Literature (RSL) and in 2024, she founded the RSL Scriptorium Awards, offering her cottage as a place to write for 10 struggling UK writers a year on the Kent coast for up to a month each, in partnership with the RSL. In 2021 she founded and became the curator of the Black Britain: Writing Back series with Hamish Hamilton/Penguin Random House, bringing out-of-circulation books back into print. Thirteen books have been republished to date. In 2025, she founded the RSL Pioneer Prize, to be awarded to a different woman writer aged over 60 every year for ten years, the first winner was Maureen Duffy in 2025. The Pioneer Prize is funded by Evaristo's donation of the £100,000 she herself won from the Women's Prize Outstanding Contribution Award in 2025.

Evaristo has received more than 90 honours, awards, fellowships, nominations and other markers of recognition, and her books have been a "Book of the Year" more than 60 times. She is a lifetime Honorary Fellow of St Anne's College, Oxford, and an International Honorary Member of the American Academy of Arts & Sciences. In 2021, she succeeded Richard Eyre as President of Rose Bruford College, completing her four-year tenure in 2024 and succeeded by the actor Ray Fearon. Evaristo was vice-chair of the RSL governing council and in 2020 she became vice-president, before being announced as the RSL's president in 2021. At the end of Evaristo's four-year term, Elif Shafak was named in December 2025 as the RSL's new president.

Evaristo was appointed a Member of the Order of the British Empire (MBE) in the Queen's 2009 Birthday Honours, and an Officer of the Order of the British Empire (OBE) in the Queen's 2020 Birthday Honours, both awards for services to literature.

== Early life and career ==
Evaristo was born in 1959 in Eltham, south-east London, and christened Bernardine Anne Mobolaji Evaristo. She was raised in Woolwich, the fourth of eight children born to an English mother, Jacqueline M. Brinkworth, and a Nigerian father, Julius Taiwo Bayomi Evaristo (1927–2001), known as Danny. Brinkworth was a schoolteacher of English, Irish and German heritage. Danny Evaristo was Nigerian but born in British Cameroon and raised in Nigeria; he migrated to Britain in 1949 and became a welder and the first black councillor in the Borough of Greenwich, for the Labour Party. Her paternal grandfather, Gregorio Bankole Evaristo (d. 1927), was a Yoruba Aguda who sailed from Brazil to Nigeria. He was a customs officer. Her paternal grandmother, Zenobia Evaristo, née Sowemima (d. 1967), was from Abeokuta in Nigeria.

Evaristo was educated at Notre Dame Convent, Plumcroft Primary School and Eltham Hill Grammar School for Girls from 1970 to 1977, and in 1972 she joined Greenwich Young People's Theatre (now Tramshed, in Woolwich), about which she has said: "I was twelve years old and it was the making of my childhood and led to a life-long career spent in the arts." She went on to attend Rose Bruford College of Speech and Drama, graduating in 1982.

In the 1980s, together with Paulette Randall and Patricia Hilaire, she founded Theatre of Black Women, the first theatre company in Britain of its kind. In the 1990s, she organised Britain's first black British writing conference, held at the Museum of London, and also Britain's first black British theatre conference, held at the Royal Festival Hall. In 1995 she co-founded and directed Spread the Word, London's writer development agency.

Evaristo continued further education at Goldsmiths College, University of London, receiving her doctorate in creative writing in 2013. In 2019, she was appointed Woolwich Laureate by the Greenwich and Docklands International Festival, reconnecting to and writing about the home town she left when she was 18. In 2022, she was awarded the "Freedom of the Borough of the Royal Borough of Greenwich".

== Writing ==
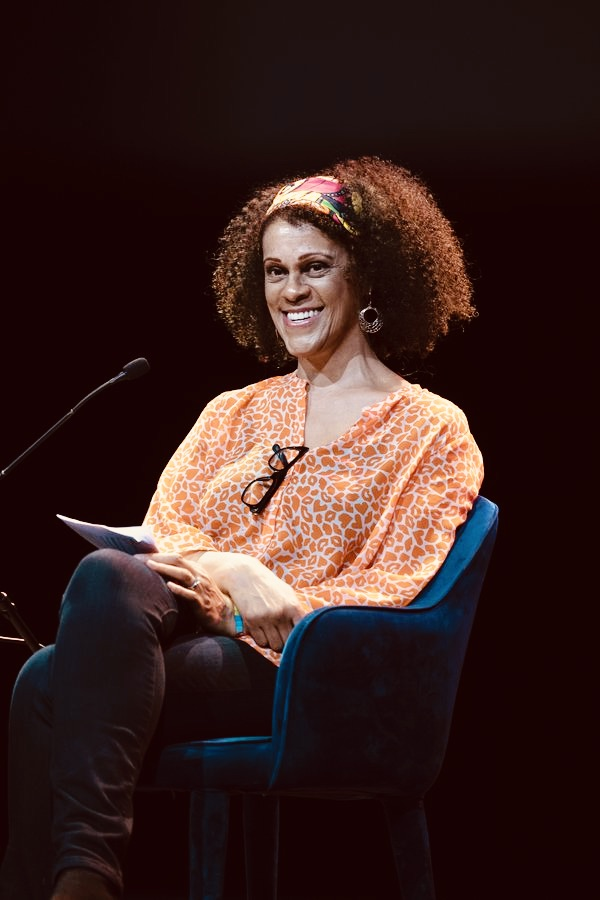
Evaristo speaking at an event.

Evaristo's first book to be published was a 1994 collection of poems called Island of Abraham (Leeds: Peepal Tree Press). She went on to become the author of two non-fiction books, and eight books of fiction and verse fiction that explore aspects of the African diaspora. She experiments with form and narrative perspective, often merging the past with the present, fiction with poetry, the factual with the speculative, and reality with alternate realities (as in her 2008 novel Blonde Roots). Her verse novel The Emperor's Babe (Penguin, 2001) is about a black teenage girl, whose parents are from Nubia, coming of age in Roman London nearly 2,000 years ago. It won an Arts Council Writers' Award 2000, a NESTA Fellowship Award in 2003, and went on to be chosen by The Times as one of the 100 Best Books of the Decade in 2010, and it was adapted into a BBC Radio 4 play in 2013. Evaristo's fourth book, Soul Tourists (Penguin, 2005), is an experimental novel about a mismatched couple driving across Europe to the Middle East, which featured ghosts of real figures of colour from European history.

Her novel Blonde Roots (Penguin, 2008) is a satire that inverts the history of the transatlantic slave trade and replaces it with a universe where Africans enslave Europeans. Blonde Roots won the Orange Youth Panel Award and Big Red Read Award, and was nominated for the International Dublin Literary Award, the Orange Prize and the Arthur C. Clarke Award.

Evaristo's other books include the verse novel Lara (Bloodaxe Books, 2009, with an earlier version published in 1997), which fictionalised the multiple cultural strands of her family history going back over 150 years as well as her London childhood in a mixed-race family. Lara won the EMMA Best Novel Award in 1998. Evaristo's novella Hello Mum (Penguin, 2010) was chosen as "The Big Read" for the County of Suffolk and was adapted into a BBC Radio 4 play in 2012.

Her novel Mr Loverman (Penguin UK, 2013/Akashic Books USA, 2014) is about a septuagenarian Caribbean Londoner, a closet homosexual considering his options after a 50-year marriage to his wife. It won the Publishing Triangle Ferro-Grumley Award for LGBT Fiction (USA) and the Jerwood Fiction Uncovered Prize. In 2023, it was announced that an eight-part television adaptation of Mr Loverman would be produced for BBC One. In 2025, the leading actor Lennie James received a BAFTA for his performance. In 2015, she wrote and presented a two-part BBC Radio 4 documentary, Fiery Inspiration – about Amiri Baraka, on BBC Radio 4.

Evaristo's novel Girl, Woman, Other (May 2019, Hamish Hamilton/Penguin UK) is an innovative polyvocal "fusion fiction" about 12 primarily black British women. Their ages span 19 to 93 and they are a mix of cultural backgrounds, sexual orientations, classes and geographies, and the novel charts their hopes, struggles and intersecting lives. In July 2019, the novel was selected for the Booker Prize longlist, then made the shortlist, announced on 3 September 2019, alongside books by Margaret Atwood, Lucy Ellmann, Chigozie Obioma, Salman Rushdie and Elif Shafak. On 14 October, Girl, Woman, Other won the Booker Prize jointly with Atwood's The Testaments. The win made Evaristo the first black woman and first Black British author to win the prize. Girl, Woman, Other was one of Barack Obama's 19 Favourite Books of 2019 and Roxane Gay's Favourite Book of 2019. The novel was also shortlisted for the 2020 Women's Prize for Fiction.

In 2020, Evaristo won the British Book Awards: Fiction Book of the Year and Author of the Year, the Indie Book Award for Fiction. In June 2020, Evaristo became the first black woman and first Black British writer to reach number one in the UK paperback fiction charts, where she held the top spot for five weeks and spent 44 weeks in the Top 10.

Evaristo has been included on the Black Powerlist 100 every year since 2020, which recognised the United Kingdom's most influential people of African or African Caribbean heritage. In 2025 she received their Woman of the Year Awards. In 2020, she was included in the one-off list of 100 Great Black Britons.

In 2022, Girl, Woman, Other was included on the "Big Jubilee Read" list of 70 books by Commonwealth authors chosen to celebrate the Platinum Jubilee of Elizabeth II.

Evaristo's writing also includes short fiction, drama, poetry, essays, literary criticism, and projects for stage and radio. Two of her books, The Emperor's Babe (2001) and Hello Mum (2010), have been adapted into BBC Radio 4 dramas. Her ninth book, Manifesto: On Never Giving Up, is published by Penguin UK (October 2021) and Grove Atlantic USA (2022). Her tenth book, Feminism (November 2021), is part of Tate Britain's "Look Again" series (Tate Publishing). She offers a personal survey of the representation of the art of British women of colour in the context of the gallery's forthcoming major rehang. In 2020 Evaristo collaborated with fashion designer Valentino on their Collezione Milano collection, writing poetic text to accompany photographs of the collection by the photographer Liz Johnson Artur, published as a coffee-table book (Rizzoli, 2021).

Evaristo has written many articles, essays, fiction and book reviews for publications including: The Times, Vanity Fair, The Guardian, The Observer, The Independent, Vogue, Harper's Bazaar UK, The Times Literary Supplement, Condé Nast Traveler, Wasafiri, and the New Statesman. She is a contributor to New Daughters of Africa (Myriad Editions, 2019), edited by Margaret Busby.

== Editing and curatorial work ==
Evaristo guest-edited The Sunday Times Style magazine (UK) in July 2020 with a black-woman/-xn takeover, featuring an array of young artists, activists and change-makers. A few years earlier, she was the guest editor of the September 2014 issue of Mslexia magazine, the Poetry Society of Great Britain's centenary winter issue The Poetry Review (2012), titled "Offending Frequencies"; a special issue of Wasafiri magazine called Black Britain: Beyond Definition (Routledge, 2010), with poet Karen McCarthy Woolf; Ten, an anthology of Black and Asian poets, with poet Daljit Nagra (Bloodaxe Books, 2010), and in 2007, she co-edited the New Writing Anthology NW15 (Granta/British Council). Evaristo was also editor of FrontSeat intercultural magazine in the 1990s, and one of the editors of Black Women Talk Poetry anthology (published in 1987 by the Black Womantalk Poetry collective of which Evaristo was part), Britain's first such substantial anthology, featuring among its 20 poets Jackie Kay, Dorothea Smartt and Adjoa Andoh.

In October 2020, it was announced that Evaristo is curating a new book series with Hamish Hamilton at Penguin Random House publishers, "Black Britain: Writing Back", which involves bringing back into print and circulation books from the past. The first six books, novels, were published in February 2021, including Minty Alley (1936) by C. L. R. James and The Dancing Face (1997) by Mike Phillips.

== Media appearances ==
Evaristo has been the subject of two major arts television documentary series: The South Bank Show, with Melvyn Bragg (Sky Arts, Autumn 2020) and Imagine, with Alan Yentob ("Bernardine Evaristo: Never Give Up", BBC One, September 2021). She has given many other interviews, including for HARDtalk, with Stephen Shakur (BBC World, 2020) and This Cultural Life, with John Wilson (BBC4, November 2021). She was also the subject of Profile (BBC Radio 4, 2019) and Desert Island Discs on BBC Radio 4, interviewed by Lauren Laverne, in 2020. In 2015, Evaristo wrote and presented a two-part BBC Radio 4 documentary called Fiery Inspiration: Amiri Baraka and the Black Arts Movement.

Her many podcast appearances in Britain include interviews conducted by Adwoa Aboah, Samira Ahmed, Elizabeth Day, Grace Dent, Annie MacManus, Graham Norton, James O'Brien, Natalie Portman, Jay Rayner, Simon Savidge, Pandora Sykes and Jeremy Vine.

In the two months following her win of the Booker Prize, Evaristo has written that she received more invitations to give interviews than in the entirety of her career.

== Teaching and touring ==
Evaristo has taught creative writing since 1994. She has also been awarded many writing fellowships and residencies including the Montgomery Fellowship at Dartmouth College in Hanover, New Hampshire in 2015; for the British Council at Georgetown University, Washington, DC; Barnard College/ Columbia University, New York; University of the Western Cape, South Africa; the Virginia Arts Festival (Virginia, USA), and Writing Fellow at the University of East Anglia, UK. She taught the University of East Anglia-Guardian "How to Tell a Story" course for four seasons in London up until 2015. Evaristo is Professor of Creative Writing at Brunel University London, having taught at the university since 2011.

Since 1997, she has accepted more than 170 international invitations as a writer. These involve writer residencies and visiting fellowships, British Council tours, book tours, teaching creative writing courses and workshops as well as keynotes, talks and panels at many conferences and literary festivals. She chaired and curated the longstanding, annual British Council Berlin Literature Seminar in 2017, 2018 and 2023. She delivered the New Statesman/Goldsmiths Prize lecture on 30 September 2020. In October 2020, she gave the opening keynote address at the Frankfurt Book Fair's Publishing Insights conference, in which she called on publishers to hire more people representing a wider range of communities: "We have to have people working in the industry from all these communities who are looking for something beyond the cliches and stereotypes."

Evaristo is the Literature Mentor for the Rolex Mentor & Protege Arts Initiative for 2023–2024 mentoring the Ghanaian novelist Ayesha Harruna Attah. Previous arts mentors since the programme began in 2002 include Margaret Atwood, Gilberto Gil, Philip Glass, Sir Peter Hall, David Hockney, Sir Anish Kapoor, William Kentridge, Spike Lee, Phyllida Lloyd, Lin Manuel Miranda, Toni Morrison, Jessye Norman, Yousou N'Dour, Michael Ondaatje, Martin Scorsese, Wole Soyinka, Julie Taymor and Mario Vargas Llosa.

=== The Complete Works ===
In 2006, Evaristo initiated an Arts Council-funded report delivered by Spread the Word writer development agency into why black and Asian poets were not getting published in the UK, which revealed that less than 1 per cent of all published poetry is by poets of colour.

When the report was published, she then initiated The Complete Works mentoring scheme, with Nathalie Teitler and Spread the Word. In this national development programme, 30 poets were mentored, each over a one- or two-year period, and many went on to publish books, win awards and receive serious recognition for their poetry.

== Other activities ==
Aside from founding the RSL Scriptorium Awards and the Brunel International African Poetry Prize, she has judged many prizes. In 2012 she was chair of the jury for both the Caine Prize for African Writing and the Commonwealth Short Story Prize. In 2021, she was Chair of the Women's Prize for Fiction panel of judges. In 2023, she chaired the Forward Poetry book prizes. In 2024, she chaired the inaugural Nero Gold Prize of the Nero Book Awards and the inaugural Global Black Women's Prize for Non-Fiction founded by Cassava Republic Press.

Evaristo has also served on many councils and advisory committees for various organisations including the Council of the Royal Society of Literature (RSL) since 2017, the Arts Council of England, the London Arts Board, the British Council Literature Advisory Panel, the Society of Authors, the Poetry Society (Chair) and Wasafiri international literature magazine.

Two portraits of Evaristo are in the National Portrait Gallery, London.: one by Sal Idriss and one by Ruth Ossai.

=== Royal Society of Literature ===
Evaristo was elected as President of the Royal Society of Literature from the end of 2021 (following the retirement of Dame Marina Warner), becoming the first writer of colour and only the second woman to hold the position in the Society's 200-year history. She stated at the time of the announcement: "Literature is not a luxury, but essential to our civilisation. I am so proud, therefore, to be the figurehead of such an august and robust literature organisation that is so actively and urgently committed to being inclusive." In 2022, she commented in a profile piece on her in the New Yorker on the subject of the RSL "40 under 40" scheme and RSL Open initiative to bring in outstanding younger and more diverse writers to the RSL: "It's like you've got two hundred years of history to counterbalance ... So are you going to wait another two hundred years, or are you going to just speed the process up a bit?" The RSL Open scheme was set up because at that time there were more RSL Fellows aged over 100 (three) than under 40.

In her role as President of the RSL, she brought three philanthropic projects to the charity that were not managed or administrated by her, since her role was that of figurehead. As a Sky Arts Ambassador, Evaristo spearheaded the Sky Arts RSL Writers Awards, providing mentoring for under-represented writers. In 2024, she founded the RSL Scriptorium Awards, offering her cottage on the Kent coast for free to ten writers a year who struggle to find the time and space to write. Each writer will have the entire cottage to themselves for a month In 2025, Evaristo founded the RSL Pioneer Prize, dedicated to honouring women writers over 60 years of age who laid the ground for future generations. The role of President is that of the organisation's figurehead and Evaristo was not involved in the management of the charity. However, from 2023, the RSL received criticism over the new diversity of fellowship, the emphasis on younger fellows, and for not taking a strong enough stance about the stabbing of Salman Rushdie and the cancellation of Kate Clanchy. In February 2024, Evaristo defended the RSL in The Guardian against "all attacks", and stated in an article that the RSL "cannot take sides in writers' controversies and issues, but must remain impartial." The Royal Society of Literature later stated that Evaristo was neither a trustee of the RSL nor a "decision maker or manager".

== Personal life ==
Evaristo identified as a lesbian during the 1980s when she was also involved in the Black womanist movement.

She is married to writer David Shannon, whom she met in 2006, and whose debut novel was launched in March 2021. The artist Charlie Evaristo-Boyce is her nephew.

== Awards and recognition ==
=== Fellowships and other personal honours ===
- 2002: UEA Writing Fellow, University of East Anglia
- 2003: National Endowment of Science, Technology and the Arts (NESTA) Fellowship Award
- 2004: Elected a Fellow, Royal Society of Literature (est. 1820)
- 2006: British Council Fellow, Georgetown University, USA
- 2006: Elected a Fellow, Royal Society of Arts (est. 1754)
- 2009: Awarded an MBE in the Queen's Birthday Honours List for services to Literature
- 2015: The Montgomery Fellow, Dartmouth College, USA
- 2017: Elected an Honorary Fellow, the English Association (est. 1906)
- 2018: Elected a Fellow of Rose Bruford College of Theatre & Performance
- 2019: Financial Times: list of 14 women gamechangers
- 2019: The Bookseller 150 power list
- 2020: Awarded an OBE in the Queen's 2020 Birthday Honours for services to literature
- 2020: British Book Awards: Author of the Year
- 2020: Elle 50 – list of Britain's gamechangers
- 2020: Gold Medal of Honorary Patronage (est. 1683), Trinity College Dublin
- 2020: GG2 Woman of the Year Award
- 2020: The Vogue 25 for 2020 – list of Britain's 25 most influential women
- 2020: Voted one of 100 Great Black Britons
- 2020: The Bookseller 150 power list
- 2021: Glamour magazine Women of the Year, Gamechanging Author Award
- 2021: Honorary International Fellow, American Academy of Arts & Sciences (est. 1780)
- 2021: President of Rose Bruford College of Theatre and Performance
- 2021: The UK Black Powerlist 100 (1st year)
- 2021: Vanity Fair magazine Challenger Award
- 2021: The Bookseller 150 power list
- 2022: Appointed President, Royal Society of Literature (2022–2026)
- 2022: Forbes "50 over 50" honoree for the Europe, Middle East & Africa region
- 2022: Honorary Doctor of Arts and Letters, King's College London
- 2022: Honorary Doctor of Letters, Queen Mary University of London
- 2022: Honorary Doctor of Letters, Glasgow Caledonian University
- 2022: Honorary Doctor of Letters, University of Greenwich
- 2022: Honorary Fellow, Goldsmiths, University of London 2022: Honorary Doctor of Arts, London South Bank University
- 2022: Honorary Fellow, CILIP, The Library and Information Association
- 2022: Sky Arts: Britain's 50 Most Influential Artists of the Past 50 years (No. 26)
- 2022: Soho House Awards: Writer
- 2022: Stylist magazine Remarkable Women Awards: Writer of the Year
- 2022: The UK Black Black Powerlist 100 (2nd year)
- 2023: The UK Black Powerlist 100 (3rd year)
- 2023: Honorary Doctor of Letters, University of Exeter
- 2023: Honorary Doctor of Letters, University of Sheffield
- 2023: A Goodreads Top Book of the last decade (2013–2023)
- 2023: Black Excellence Awards – Outstanding Contribution to Literature
- 2024: The UK Black Powerlist 100 (4th year)
- 2024: Fair Saturday Award, Fair Saturday Foundation, Bilbao, Spain
- 2024: Praeses Elit Award, Trinity College Dublin, Ireland
- 2025: Women's Prize Outstanding Contribution Award, to mark the 30th anniversary year of the Women's Prize for Fiction
- 2025: Visiting Professor of Creative Media 2025/6, University of Oxford (est. 1996)
- 2026: Elected a lifelong Honorary Member, National Liberal Club (est. 1882)
- 2026: Elected a Fellow, City Lit/ City Literary Institute (est. 1919)

=== Lara (1997) ===
- 1999: EMMA Best Book Award for Lara

=== The Emperor's Babe (2001) ===
- 2000: Arts Council England Writer's Award 2000, for The Emperor's Babe
- 2010: The Emperor's Babe, The Times (UK) "100 Best Books of the Decade"

=== Blonde Roots (2008) ===
- 2009: Arthur C. Clarke Award (nominated)
- 2009: Big Red Read Award, Fiction and Overall (winner)
- 2009: International Dublin Literary Award (nominated)
- 2009: Orange Prize for Fiction (nominated)
- 2009: Orange Prize Youth Panel Award
- 2010: Hurston/Wright Legacy Award, USA (finalist)

=== Ten (2010) ===
- 2010: Poetry Book Society Commendation for Ten, co-edited with Daljit Nagra

=== Mr Loverman (2013) ===
- 2014: Jerwood Fiction Uncovered Prize (winner)
- 2015: Triangle Publishing Awards: Ferro-Grumley Award for LGBT Fiction, USA

=== Girl, Woman, Other (2019) ===
- 2019: Goodread's Choice Award | Best Fiction (finalist)
- 2019: Gordon Burn Prize (finalist)
- 2019: Booker Prize (winner)
- 2019: Shelf Awareness best fiction of 2019
- 2020: Australian Book Industry Awards (longlisted)
- 2020: British Book Awards: Fiction Book of the Year
- 2020: Ferro-Grumley Award USA (finalist)
- 2020: Indie Book Award for Fiction
- 2020: Le Prix Millepages, France
- 2020: Lifetime Honorary Fellow, St Anne's College, University of Oxford
- 2020: Vice President, Royal Society of Literature
- 2020: Orwell Prize (finalist)
- 2020: Reading Women Award
- 2020: The Glass Bell Award (finalist)
- 2020: Visionary Honours Awards (finalist)
- 2020: Women's Prize for Fiction (finalist)
- 2021: European Literature Award, Holland (finalist)
- 2021: Freedom of the Borough Award, Royal Borough of Greenwich
- 2021: International Dublin Literary Award (finalist)
- 2021: Nielsen Gold Bestseller Award
- 2021: Person of the Year – as the 151st honoree of The Bookseller's 150 Power List.
- 2021: Premio Gregor von Rezzori (Italy) (finalist)
- 2021: Premio Lattes Grinzane (Italy) (finalist)
- 2022: Bestsellery Empiku Award (Poland) (finalist)
- 2022: Plebiscyt Ksiazka Roku 2021/ Literatura Piekna (Poland) (finalist)

=== Manifesto (2022) ===
- 2022: Visionary Honours Book of the Year 2021 (finalist)
- 2023: Prix de Libraires du Quebec, Canada (finalist)
- 2023: Grand Prix des Lecteurs, France (finalist)
- 2024: Praeses Elit Award, Trinity College Dublin

== Academic honours ==
- 2014: Appointed The Public Orator, Brunel University London
- 2015: CBASS Award for Excellence, Brunel University London
- 2017: Teach Brunel Award, Brunel University London
- 2020: Vice Chancellor's Award for Staff, Brunel University London
- 2022: CBASS Lecturer of the Year, Brunel University London

== Books ==
- 1994: Island of Abraham (poems, Peepal Tree Press; ISBN 978-0948833601)
- 1997: Lara (novel, Angela Royal Publishing; ISBN 9781899860456)
- 2001: The Emperor's Babe (verse novel, Hamish Hamilton/Penguin; Penguin USA, 2002; ISBN 978-0140297812)
- 2005: Soul Tourists (novel, Hamish Hamilton/Penguin; ISBN 978-0140297829)
- 2008: Blonde Roots (novel, Hamish Hamilton/Penguin; Riverhead/Penguin USA, 2009; ISBN 978-0141031521)
- 2009: Lara (new, expanded edition, (Bloodaxe Books; ISBN 978-1852248314)
- 2010: Hello Mum (novella, Penguin UK; ISBN 978-0141044385)
- 2013: Mr Loverman (novel, Penguin UK; Akashic Books; ISBN 978-1617752896)
- 2019: Girl, Woman, Other (novel, Hamish Hamilton/Penguin; ISBN 978-0241364901)
- 2021: Manifesto: On Never Giving Up (memoir, Hamish Hamilton/Penguin; ISBN 978-0241534991)
- 2021: Feminism (Look Again Series, Tate Galleries Publishing; ISBN 978-1849767163)

== Adaptations ==
=== Mr Loverman TV Series (2024) ===
In June 2023, it was announced that Lennie James was to star and executive produce an eight-part series of Mr Loverman for BBC One. It was broadcast in 2024 from 14 October to 4 November and starred Lennie James, Ariyon Bakare and Sharon D. Clarke.

The series was praised by critics: The Guardian's Lucy Mangan, Nick Hilton at The Independent, Gabriel Tate of The Daily Telegraph, while Abby Robinson for the Radio Times was more indifferent.

In 2025, the leading actor Lennie James won a BAFTA for his performance along with a Royal Television Society Programme award. The BAFTA for supporting actor was awarded to Ariyon Bakare in the same year. Sharon D. Clarke was nominated for Best Actress.

=== Radio ===
- 2012: Hello Mum. A radio play, adapted from the 2010 novella. BBC Radio 4, 3 Aug
- 2013: The Emperor's Babe. A full-cast drama. BBC Radio 4, 23 May.
- 2014: London Choral Celestial Jazz. Read by Bernardine Evaristo. BBC Radio 4, 30 May
- 2019: Girl, Woman, Other. Bernardine Evaristo's book group. BBC Radio 4, Front Row, 15 October
- 2020: Girl, Woman, Other. Abridged by Patricia Cumper and read by Pippa Bennett-Warner. BBC Radio 4, 2020
- 2025: Bernardine Evaristo: A BBC Radio Collection. Seven recordings including Hello Mum, The Emperor's Babe and others. BBC Studios Distribution Ltd

== Plays ==
- 1982: Moving Through, a choral dramatic poem, Talking Black Festival, Royal Court Theatre Upstairs
- 1982: Tiger Teeth Clenched Not to Bite, a poetic monologue. Theatre of Black Women, the Melkweg, Amsterdam
- 1983: Silhouette, an experimental verse drama. Theatre of Black Women tour. Co-writer: Patricia St. Hilaire
- 1984: Pyeyucca, an experimental verse drama. Theatre of Black Women tour. Additional material: Patricia St. Hilaire
- 2002: Medea – Mapping the Edge. Verse drama. Wilson Wilson Company at Sheffield Crucible Theatre and BBC Radio Drama
- 2003: Madame Bitterfly and the Stockwell Diva. Verse drama. The Friday Play, BBC Radio 4, starring Rudolph Walker, Clare Perkins, Dona Croll
- 2020: First, Do No Harm, a poetic monologue, Old Vic Theatre online, directed by Adrian Lester and produced by Lolita Chakrabarti, starring Sharon D. Clarke.

== Short fiction (selected) ==
- 1994: "Letters from London" in Miscegenation Blues: voices of mixed-race women, edited by Carol Camper (Sister Vision Press)
- 2005: On Top of the World (BBC Radio 4)
- 2006: "Ohtakemehomelord.com" in The Guardian's annual short-story supplement (July)
- 2008: "A Matter of Timing", The Guardian
- 2010: "On Top of the World", The Mechanics Institute Review, Issue 7 (Birkbeck, University of London)
- 2011: "I Think I'm Going Slightly Mad" in One for the Trouble, The Book Slam Annual, edited by Patrick Neate (Book Slam Productions)
- 2014: "Our Billy, (or should it be Betty?)" in Letter to an Unknown Soldier, 14–18 NOW UK WW1 Centenary Art Commissions (William Collins/HarperCollins)
- 2015: "Yoruba Man Walking" in Closure: a new anthology of contemporary black British fiction, edited by Jacob Ross (Peepal Tree Press)
- 2016: "The Human World" in How Much the Heart Can Hold, edited by Emma Herdman (Hodder & Stoughton)
- 2020: "Star of the Season", British Vogue
- 2020: "The White Man's Liberation Front", New Statesman

== Essays ==
- 1992: "Black Theatre", Artrage (Winter/Spring)
- 1993: "Black Women in Theatre", Six Plays by Black and Asian Women Writers, edited by Kadjia George (Aurora Metro Press)
- 1996: "Going it Alone" – one-person shows in black British theatre, Artrage
- 1998: "On Staying Power" by Peter Fryer for BBC Windrush Education
- 2001: "Roaring Zora" on the life and writing of Zora Neale Hurston, Marie Claire
- 2005: "An Introduction to Contemporary British Poetry", British Council Literature Magazine
- 2005: "False Memory Syndrome: Writing Black in Britain", in Writing Worlds (New Writing Partnership/University of East Anglia)
- 2005: "Origins", Crossing Borders, British Council online
- 2005: "The Road Less Travelled", Necessary Journeys, edited by Melanie Keen and Eileen Daley, Arts Council England
- 2007: "Writing the Past: Traditions, Inheritances, Discoveries" in Writing Worlds 1: The Norwich Exchanges (University of East Anglia/Pen & Inc Press)
- 2008: "CSI Europe: African Trace Elements. Fragments. Reconstruction. Case Histories. Motive. Personal", Wasafiri (Taylor & Francis)
- 2009: Autobiographical essay, Contemporary Writers, Vol. 275 (Gale Publishing, USA)
- 2009: Autobiographical essay, "My Father's House" (Five Dials)
- 2010: Introduction to Ten poetry anthology, "Why This, Why Now?", on the need for The Complete Works initiative to diversify British poetry publications (Bloodaxe Books)
- 2010: Introduction to Wasafiri Black Britain: Beyond Definition, "The Illusion of Inclusion", Issue 64, Winter 2010 (Routledge)
- 2010: "The Month of September", on writing and process, Volume 100:4, Winter 2010 Poetry Review
- 2011: "Myth, Motivation, Magic & Mechanics", Body of Work: 40 Years of Creative Writing at UEA (University of East Anglia), edited by Giles Foden (Full Circle Editions)
- 2013: The Book that Changed Me Series: Essay on For colored girls who have considered suicide when the rainbow is enuf by Ntozake Shange (BBC Radio 3)
- 2016: "The Privilege of Being a Mixed Race Woman", Tangled Roots: Real Life Stories from Mixed Race Britain, Anthology Number 2, edited by Katy Massey (Tangled Roots)
- 2019: "What a Time to be a (Black) (British) (Womxn) Writer", in Brave New Words, edited by Susheila Nasta (Myriad Editions)
- 2020: "Claiming Whiteness", The House magazine, of the (Houses of Parliament)
- 2020: Foreword to Bedside Guardian, the annual Guardian anthology
- 2020: Foreword: "Re:Thinking: 'Diversity' in Publishing", by Dr Anamik Saha and Dr Sandra van Lente (Goldsmiths University/Newgen Publishing UK)
- 2020: "Gender in the Blender", for A Point of View, BBC Radio 4
- 2020: Introduction to Loud Black Girls, edited by Yomi Adegoke and Elizabeth Uviebinené (HarperCollins)
- 2020: "Literature Can Foster Our Shared Humanity", British Vogue, 6 June 2020.
- 2020: "Loving the Body Fat-tastic", for A Point of View, BBC Radio 4
- 2020: "On Mrs Dalloway", BBC Radio 4
- 2020: "Spiritual Pick and Mix", for A Point of View, BBC Radio 4
- 2020: "The Longform Patriarchs and their Accomplices", New Statesman
- 2020: "The Pro-Mask Movement", for A Point of View, BBC Radio 4
- 2020: "Theatre of Black Women: A Personal Account", in The Palgrave Handbook of the History of Women on Stage, edited by Jan Sewell and Clare Smout (Palgrave Macmillan)
- 2020: "Why Black Lives Matter", for A Point of View, BBC Radio 4
- 2021: Introduction to Beloved by Toni Morrison (Vintage)
- 2021: Introduction to Bernard and the Cloth Monkey by Judith Bryan (1998), "Black Britain: Writing Back" series (Hamish Hamilton/Penguin reissue)
- 2021: Introduction to Black Teacher by Beryl Gilroy (Faber and Faber)
- 2021: Introduction to for Colored Girls Who Have Considered Suicide / When the Rainbow Is Enuf by Ntozake Shange (Orion)
- 2021: Introduction to Incomparable World by S. I. Martin (1996), "Black Britain: Writing Back" series (Hamish Hamilton/Penguin reissue)
- 2021: Introduction to Minty Alley by C. L. R. James (1936), "Black Britain: Writing Back" series (Hamish Hamilton/Penguin reissue)
- 2021: Introduction to The Dancing Face by Mike Phillips (1997), "Black Britain: Writing Back" series (Hamish Hamilton/Penguin reissue)
- 2021: Introduction to The Fat Lady Sings by Jacqueline Roy (2000), "Black Britain: Writing Back" series (Hamish Hamilton/Penguin reissue)
- 2021: Introduction to Without Prejudice by Nicola Williams (1997), "Black Britain: Writing Back" series (Hamish Hamilton/Penguin reissue)
- 2022: "The Artistic Triumph of Older Black Women", The Guardian

== Editor ==
- 1987: Editor, with Da Choong, Olivette Cole-Wilson, and Gabriela Pearse, Black Women Talk Poetry anthology
- 1996–1997: Editor, FrontSeat quarterly inter-cultural performance magazine (Black Theatre Forum)
- 1998–2008: Associate editor, Wasafiri international literature journal (Queen Mary University London and Open University)
- 2007: Editor, with Maggie Gee, NW15: New Writing Anthology, 15th annual edition (British Council and Granta)
- 2010: Editor, with Daljit Nagra, Ten: New Poets poetry anthology, introducing ten new poets from The Complete Works project (Bloodaxe Books)
- 2010: Guest editor, with Karen McCarthy Woolf, Wasafiri, Black Britain: Beyond Definition, Special Winter Issue (Routledge)
- 2012: Guest editor, Poetry Review, Offending Frequencies for The Poetry Society of Great Britain, Special Centenary Winter Issue, Volume 102.4
- 2014: Editorial Selector, the Commonwealth Writers Short Story Prize anthology, Let's Tell This Story Properly, edited by Ellah Allfrey (Dundern Press, Canada)
- 2014: Guest editor, Mslexia quarterly magazine of creative writing, Issue Number 63
- 2014–2020, Originator and supervising editor of annual student anthologies at Brunel University London: The Voices Inside Our Heads, The Psyche Supermarket, The Imagination Project, It's Complicated, Totem, Pendulum and Letter to My Younger Self 2019, Kintsugi
- 2014–ongoing. Editorial Board, the African Poetry Book Fund, with Prairie Schooner poetry magazine at the University of Nebraska–Lincoln
- 2020: Guest editor, The Sunday Times Style magazine

== Literary prize juries ==
- 1997: Ian St. James Award (Fiction)
- 2004: The Next Generation Top 20 List, organised by the Poetry Book Society (PBS) and Poetry Society
- 2006: The National Poetry Competition
- 2007: Northern Rock Writers' Award (Fiction & Poetry)
- 2008: Decibel Penguin Prize (Fiction)
- 2009: Young Muslim Writers Awards with Penguin Publishers (Fiction)
- 2010: Alfred Fagon Award – (Black plays)
- 2010: Orange Award for New Writers (Women's fiction)
- 2010: T. S. Eliot Prize (Poetry)
- 2011: Peacock Poetry Prize (Brighton Festival)
- 2012: Chair: Caine Prize for African Writing
- 2012: Chair: Commonwealth Short Story Prize
- 2012: Founder & Chair of the Brunel University African Poetry Prize
- 2012: The Poetry Society's Poetry News competition
- 2013: Chair: The Brunel International African Poetry Prize
- 2013: Golden Baobab Prize, Ghana (short stories for African children)
- 2013: Sillerman First Book Prize for African Poets (USA)
- 2014: Chair: The Brunel International African Poetry Prize
- 2014: OCM Bocas Prize for Caribbean Literature, Poetry (Trinidad)
- 2014: Sillerman First Book Prize for African Poets, USA
- 2015: Chair: The Brunel International African Poetry Prize
- 2015: Costa Book Award Best Novel & Costa Book of the Year
- 2015: First Story National Writing Competition
- 2015: Prairie Schooner First Book Prize (USA)
- 2016: Chair: The Brunel International African Poetry Prize
- 2016: Goldsmiths Prize for innovative fiction
- 2016: Guardian and 4th Estate BAME Short Story Prize
- 2016: Sillerman First Book Prize for African Poets (USA)
- 2017: Chair: Brunel International African Poetry Prize
- 2018: 40 New Fellows under 40 Royal Society of Literature
- 2018: Chair: Brunel International African Poetry Prize
- 2018: Geneva Writers' Prize
- 2018: Isis magazine Writing Competition, Oxford University
- 2018: The Queen's Commonwealth Essay Competition
- 2019: Anthony Burgess/Observer newspaper Award for Arts' Journalism
- 2019: Glenna Luschei Prize for African Poetry
- 2019: Harper's Short Story Award
- 2019: Polari Book Prize for LGBTQ+ fiction
- 2021: Chair, Women's Prize for Fiction
- 2021: Sunday Times Style Journalism Competition
- 2023: Chair, OCM Bocas Prize for Caribbean Literature, Best Overall Book
- 2023: Chair, Forward Prize Best Collection & Best First Collection
- 2024: Chair, Nero Gold Prize for Book of the Year
- 2024: Chair, Global Black Women's Non-Fiction Prize, Cassava Republic Press
- 2025: Judge, Nero Gold Prize for Book of the Year
- 2025: Judge, Mslexia Adult Novel Competition
- 2025: Judge, Nero New Writers Prize with Brunel University of London

== Voluntary advisory ==
- Board of directors, Black Mime Theatre Company, 1990s
- Advisory board: Wasafiri Literature Magazine, 2000–
- General Council: The Poetry Society of Great Britain, 2001–2004
- Special Literature Advisor: London Arts Board, 2001–2005
- Chair: The Poetry Society of Great Britain, 2003–2004
- Literature Advisor: The British Council, 2003–2006
- Advisory Committee: New Galleries, Museum of London, 2004–2008
- Advisory Board: MA Creative Writing, City University, 2004–2009
- Founder: Free Verse & The Complete Works schemes, 2005–2017
- The Society of Authors Management Committee, 2008–2009
- Patron: Westminster Befriend a Family (WBAF), 2009–2011
- Editorial Board: the African Poetry Book Series, APBF, University of Nebraska–Lincoln, 2012–
- Patron: SI Leeds Literary Prize for unpublished black/Asian women writers, 2012–
- The Folio Prize, Member of the Academy, 2013–
- Arts Council England, Member of the South East Area Council, 2014–2015
- Quality Assurance Agency for Higher Education Creative Writing Panel, 2014–2015
- Elected to Council, Royal Society of Literature, 2016–
- Vice President, Royal Society of Literature, 2017–2020
- President, Royal Society of Literature, 2021–2025
