= Zuzu Bollin =

American blues guitarist and singer

- Also known as: Zu Zu Bollin, Zuzu Bolin
- Born: A.D. Bollin; September 5, 1922; Frisco, Texas, United States
- Died: October 2, 1990 (aged 68); Dallas, Texas, United States
- Genres: Blues, Texas blues
- Occupation(s): Musician, singer-songwriter
- Instrument(s): Guitar, vocals
- Years active: 1950–1955; 1988–1990

Zuzu Bollin (September 5, 1922 – October 19, 1990) was an American Texas blues guitarist and singer from Frisco, Texas. Originally named A.D. Bollin, the name 'Zuzu' is believed to refer to a brand of ginger-snap cookies popular at the time.

Bollin notably recorded "Why Don't You Eat Where You Slept Last Night" and "Headlight Blues" (1951), and variously worked alongside Duke Robillard, Doug Sahm, Booker Ervin, Percy Mayfield and David "Fathead" Newman.

Bollin was thought to be dead, until he was rediscovered in 1988 living in Dallas, Texas, by the Dallas Blues Society Records founder, Chuck Nevitt. Nevitt gathered together a band and produced Bollin's first full-length album Texas Bluesman in 1989, as the debut release on Dallas Blues Society Records. This record was sold to Antone's Records a couple of years later, and Antones released it on compact disc. This recording augmented Bollin's only four sides (two 78rpm records) recorded in the early 1950s on the Dallas-based Torch Records label. Bollin made festival dates both in the United States and abroad.

Bollin died in Dallas, Texas in October 1990, aged 68.

== See also ==
- Zu Zu Ginger Snaps
