= Cesario Azucena =

Filipino lawyer and author (1938–2021)

Cesario Alvero Azucena Jr., popularly known as Ces Azucena or C.A. Azucena, (June 16, 1938 – November 27, 2021) is a prominent labor lawyer, professor, management consultant, and author in the Philippines.

== Education ==
Azucena obtained a Bachelor of Laws degree from Ateneo Law School, a Master of Public Administration from the University of the Philippines, and has attended courses in the Master of Business Administration program of De La Salle Professional Schools.

== Human resource career ==
Azucena was once an organizer and president of a labor union of teachers. He worked as a human resource manager in business firms and non-profit organizations for more than twenty years. He was accredited as a Fellow in Personnel Management by the Personnel Management Association of the Philippines, the umbrella organization of all human resource practitioners in the country.

== Law practice ==
Azucena is currently Chairman of the Labor Law Department at Ateneo Law School. He is also a faculty member and bar reviewer in San Beda College of Law and the University of the Philippines. He is a professorial lecturer in the MBA-JD Consortium of De La Salle Professional Schools and Far Eastern University Institute of Law.

Azucena is a partner in IDLAMA Law Offices, a Makati-based law firm. He remains a retained consultant to several business firms and a frequent lecturer and resource speaker in corporate and public seminars throughout the country.

Azucena has written a gamut of books and articles on labor law and labor-management relations in the Philippines. His works are often cited in decisions penned by justices of the Philippine Supreme Court. His widely published books are either required or suggested reading material in several law, business, and graduate schools in the country.

== Professional awards ==
Azucena has received awards for professional dedication, leadership, and scholarly work. He received Sikap-Gawa Industrial Peace Award from the Bishops'-Businessmen's Conference of the Philippines, Outstanding Achievement Award from the Personnel Management Association of the Philippines, and the Supreme Court Centenary Book Award from the Supreme Court of the Philippines during its centennial anniversary celebrations on June 8, 2001.

== Publications ==
- The Labor Code with Comments and Cases: Volume I. Rex Book Store, 2007.
- The Labor Code with Comments and Cases: Volume II. Rex Book Store, 2007.
- Everyone's Labor Code. Rex Book Store, 2007.
- Labor Laws Source Book. Rex Book Store, 2007.
- Essential Labor Laws. Rex Book Store, 2004.
- Democracy and Socialism: A Curriculum of Contentions. Rex Book Store.
