= Azucena Galettini =

Argentinean writer and translator (born 1981)

- Born: 1981 (age 44–45); Buenos Aires
- Education: University of Buenos Aires
- Occupations: Writer, translator
- Writing career
- Genres: short story, novel
- Website: azucenagalettini.com

Azucena Galettini (born 1981) is an Argentinean writer and translator. She has been awarded a mention of honor by Fondo Nacional de las Artes in 2006 and was editor-in-chief of La Balandra (otra narrativa) literary magazine from 2011 to 2015.

== Education ==
She holds a BA in Latin-American Literature by Universidad de Buenos Aires and a BA in Translation (English-Spanish) by Instituto en Educación Superior en Lenguas Vivas “J. R. Fernández”.

== Career ==
Her short stories book Lo único importante en el mundo was awarded a mention of honor by Fondo Nacional de las Artes in 2006. In 2011 it was shortlisted from 500 books for the Premio Internacional de Cuento para Libro Édito “Juan José Manauta”. In 2012 it was incorporated to the portal by Fundación del Libro “Books from Argentina”, created for fostering the translation of Argentinean writers.

Her novel La primera de las tres virtudes was shortlisted from 300 manuscripts for the Premio Internacional de Novela “Letra Sur” in 2012. From 2011 to 2015 she was editor in chief of literary magazine La Balandra (otra narrativa).

She is part of Santos Paganos (Pub. Alto Pogo), Panorama Interzona. Narrativas emergentes de la Argentina (Pub. Interzona) and Ante el fin del mundo (Pub. UnLa).

== Publications ==
=== Author ===
- Galettini, Azucena (2010). Lo único importante en el mundo. Buenos Aires: El Fin de la Noche. ISBN 9789871491261.
- Burckhardt, Jacob; Galettini, Azucena (2011). Juicios sobre la historia y los historiadores. Buenos Aires: Katz Editores. ISBN 9788492946396.
- Galettini, Azucena (2016). Cuerpos, territorios y biopolíticas en la literatura latinoamericana. Buenos Aires: NJ Editor. ISBN 9789872415051.
- Appadurai, Arun; Galettini, Azucena (2017). Hacer negocios con palabras : el fracaso del lenguaje como clave para entender el. Buenos Aires: Siglo XXI Editores. ISBN 9789876297424.
- Melotti, Dario; Galettini, Azucena; Lopez, Luciano (2018). Controlar el delito, controlar la sociedad : teorías y debates sobre la cuestión. Buenos Aires: Siglo Veintiuno Editores. ISBN 9789876298186.
- Przeworski, Adam; Galettini, Azucena (2019). ¿Por qué tomarse la molestia de hacer elecciones?. pequeño manual para. Buenos Aires: Siglo XXI. ISBN 9789876298957.

=== Translator ===
- Galettini, Azucena (2016). Mozart, el asesinato y los límites del sentido común : cómo construir teoría a. Buenos Aires: Siglo Veintiuno Editores. ISBN 9789876296342.
- Pollock, Griselda; Galettini, Azucena; Costa, Laura (2023). Visión y Diferencia : Feminismo, Feminidad e Historias Del Arte. Montevideo: Editorial Fiordo Azul Ltda. ISBN 9789874178879.
