= Lennie James =

British actor (born 1965)

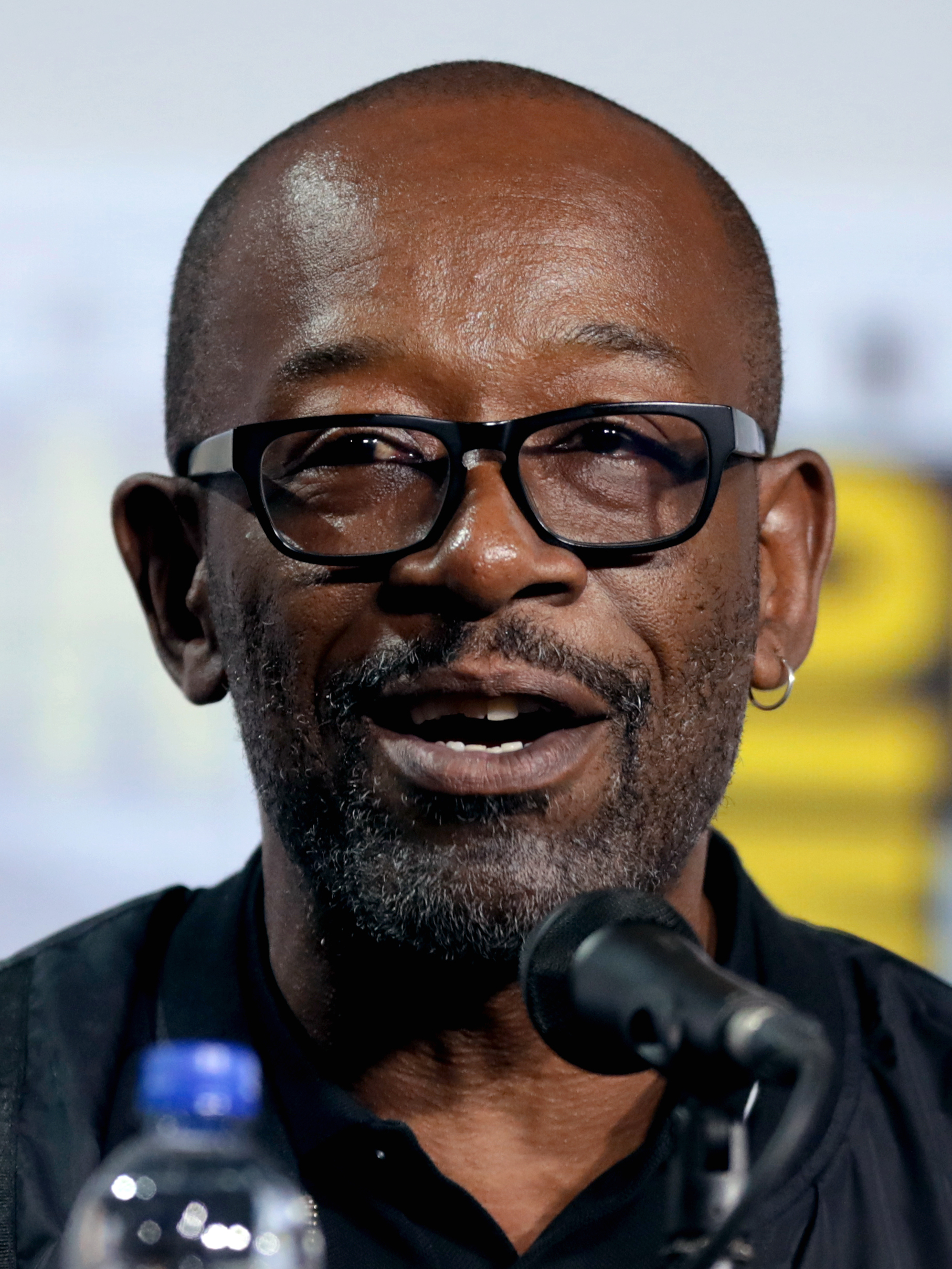
- James at the 2019 San Diego Comic-Con
- Born: Lennie Michael James; 11 October 1965 (age 61); Nottingham, England
- Education: Guildhall School of Music and Drama (BA)
- Occupations: Actor; writer
- Years active: 1988–present
- Spouse: Giselle Glasman
- Children: 3

Lennie Michael James (born 11 October 1965) is a British actor. He is best known for portraying Morgan Jones in the AMC series The Walking Dead (2010–2018) and in its spin-off, Fear the Walking Dead (2018–2023), and starring as DCI Tony Gates in Line of Duty series one.

Among James' more notable roles in television is Glen Boyle in the medical drama Critical on Sky 1. On American television, he portrayed the mysterious Robert Hawkins in the CBS series Jericho and Detective Joe Geddes in the AMC series Low Winter Sun.

James created and starred in Sky Atlantic drama series Save Me which was released in 2018 to critical acclaim. Its second season, titled Save Me Too, won the BAFTA TV Award for Best Drama Series 2021.

In 2024, James starred as Barrington Jedidiah "Barry" Walker in the BBC TV series Mr Loverman, adapted from the novel of the same name by Bernardine Evaristo, for which James won the British Academy Television Award for Best Actor at the 2025 British Academy Television Awards.

== Early life ==
Lennie Michael James was born in Nottingham, England, in 1965. The son of Afro-Trinidadian parents, he lived in South London and attended school at Ernest Bevin College. His mother, Phyllis Mary James, died when he was 11, after which he and his elder brother, Kester, chose to live in a children's home instead of being sent to the United States to reside with a relative. James remained in foster care for eight years.

James aspired to be a professional rugby player as a teenager, and was introduced to acting after following a girl he was interested in to an audition for a play. James attended the Guildhall School of Music and Drama, graduating in 1988. While there, he helped run a campaign against the school's plan to expel another student, which he has said is the bravest thing he's ever done. "That involved being taken in front of the head and threatening to boycott a big event for the Lord Mayor, even though the head said it would mean they would throw me out," James said in 2015. He was once employed by the social security office.

== Career ==
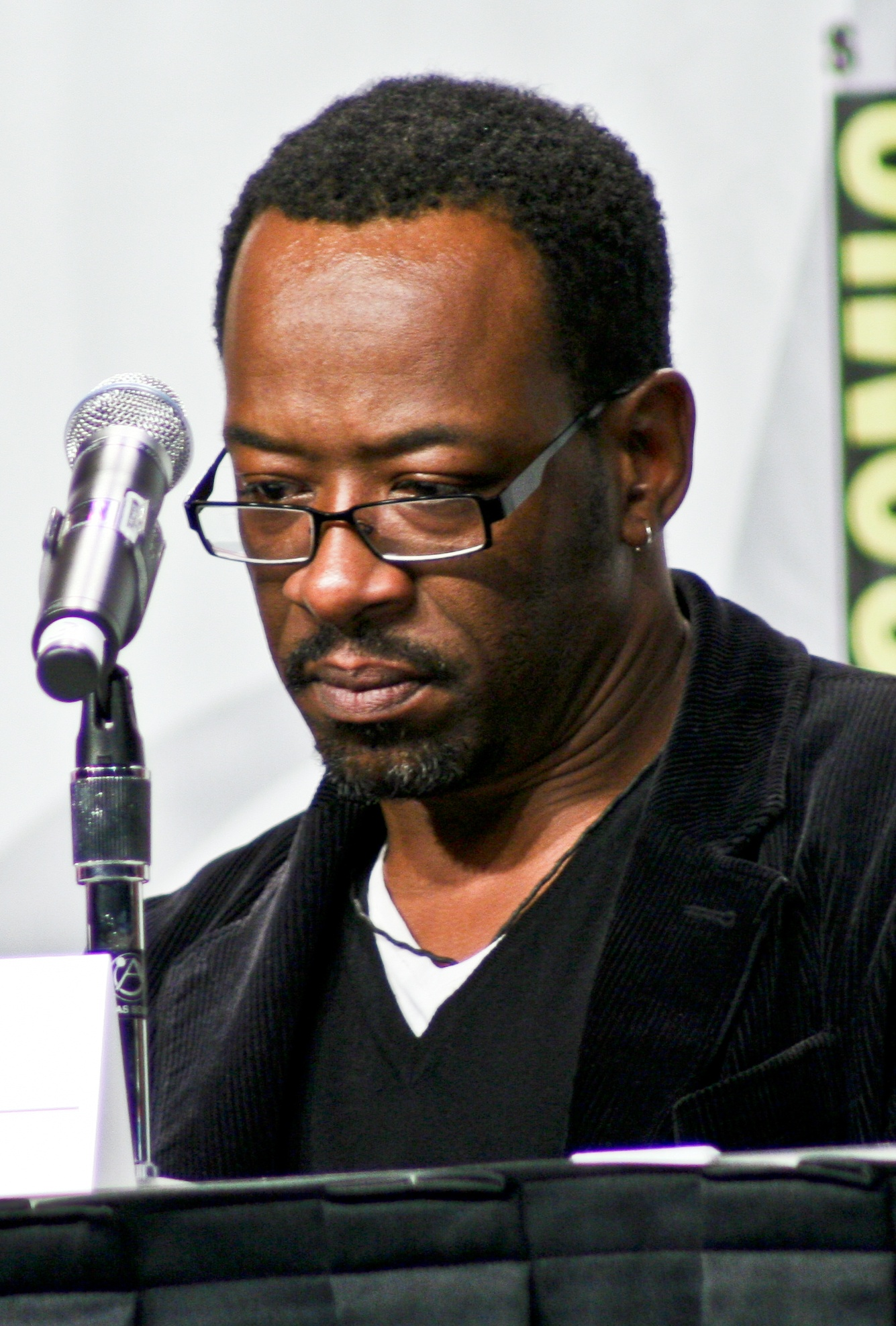
James in 2008

James has appeared in more than 20 films, including Les Misérables (1998), Snatch (2000), 24 Hour Party People (2002), Sahara (2005), and Outlaw (2007). He starred in the 2010 film Tic and appeared in the action film Colombiana (2011) and the sci-fi film Lockout (2012).

He began his career in theatre. In 1982, while studying social work, he was accepted at a workshop at the Cockpit Theatre. The following year he submitted his play Trial and Error to the National Youth Theatre-Texaco Playwriting Competition, winning Most Prominent Playwright Under 21. While studying for his a-levels he performed at Shiftwork, a youth theatre program at the Lyric Theatre, while Trial and Error was published by Faber and Faber in 1984. In 1992, he received the Clarence Derwent Award for his supporting role in The Coup by Mustapha Matura at the Royal National Theatre.

James wrote the autobiographical TV film, Storm Damage in 2000, which was nominated for a British Academy Television Award for Best Drama Series. Storm Damage depicts a teacher who tries to go back to the foster home he left and help the teenagers there, as James did. He also wrote the play The Sons of Charlie Paora, which opened at London's Royal Court Theatre in 2004.

On television, one of James' earliest appearances was as DC Carl Tanner in series 2, episode 1 of A Touch of Frost (1994). James subsequently appeared in the short-lived Channel 4 prison drama Buried (2003), the BBC terrorism drama The State Within (2006), the BBC spy drama Spooks (2002–2011), and he starred as CIA agent Robert Hawkins in the CBS post-apocalyptic drama series Jericho (2006). James appeared in a Channel 4 television drama Fallout (2008), playing the role of a detective alongside another detective solving a teen-related murder. He also appeared in an episode of Lie to Me, as well as the 2009 AMC/ITV miniseries The Prisoner, of which he said: "It wasn't necessarily the easiest gig I've ever been on, but it was always acting." He appeared in HBO's comedy series Hung as a pimp.

James appeared in episodes of the 2010 TV series Human Target as the assassin Baptiste. In 2012, he received critical acclaim for his appearance as DCI Tony Gates in BBC Two's Line of Duty, created by Jed Mercurio.

In 2010, he guest-starred as Morgan Jones in the pilot episode of the AMC series The Walking Dead, titled "Days Gone Bye". In 2013, he reprised his role as Morgan Jones in an episode of the third season of The Walking Dead titled "Clear". On 12 October 2014, James made his return to the show in a post-credit scene at the end of the fifth-season premiere and appeared again in a single scene at the end of the mid-season finale on 30 November 2014. He returned for the fifth-season finale and played a significant role in the episode. Despite his few appearances on the show, James has received significant recognition for his portrayal of Morgan from critics and fans, including being stopped by a policeman who wanted to talk to him about the show. He returned as a main cast member in the show's sixth season until the eighth season. As of 15 April 2018, James appears as Morgan in the fourth season of Fear the Walking Dead as a series regular.

On 29 March 2015, James' character was featured throughout the fifth-season finale. The actor's post-show appearance on the Talking Dead—in which he did not speak with an American accent—caused the hashtag #morganisbritish to trend on Twitter.

James stars as Glenn Boyle on the medical drama Critical which debuted on Sky 1 in February 2015. He spent nearly a year away from his home in Los Angeles to film the series. Each episode takes place in "real time," with the medical staff having to save a life in an hour. James spent a week shadowing doctors at a London hospital to prepare for the role.

James said his favourite television show is the 1980s police drama Hill Street Blues, telling the Daily Express, "It's the one that spawned every other show. It's the Muhammad Ali or Pelé of television shows."

James has also portrayed the Destiny and Destiny 2 character Lord Shaxx who is the host of the in-game activity "The Crucible" in which he voices over matches and acts as an in game vendor. In an interview with GameSpot, Lennie stated his favorite line in the game, was in fact a line straight out of Shakespeare's Romeo and Juliet. The line in question is in game as "But soft! What light through yonder window breaks? It is the east, and I—I am the Crucible."

James featured as a "castaway" on BBC Radio 4's Desert Island Discs in October 2025.

== Personal life ==
James lives in Los Angeles, California, US with wife Giselle Glasman. They have three children together. He is the main cook for his family and has professed a fondness for Caribbean cuisine. He is a fan of Tottenham Hotspur Football Club and Valencia Club de Fútbol (from Spain).

James is among the celebrities who have penned an open "letter to my younger self" for The Big Issue magazine. In his letter in March 2015, he wrote about the pain of losing his mother at a young age. "It hit me quite strongly. It had just been the three of us: my brother, my mum and me. Everything changed when the terrible thing happened. It had a profound, fundamental effect on me. One disappointment is that I never knew my mum as an adult," he wrote.

James also works as a mentor to black inner-city children, and says he rejects the importance people attach to fame and celebrity. "Boys and men in our community need to be aware of the guy who gets up every morning and goes to the job that he doesn't necessarily love, in order to support his family. They are the heroes my community need to celebrate," he said.

== Filmography ==
=== Film ===
Year	Title	Role	Notes
1995	Fathers, Sons and Unholy Ghosts	Martin	Short film
1997	The Perfect Blue	Danny	
1998	Lost in Space	Jeb Walker	
1998	Les Misérables	Enjolras	
1998	Among Giants	"Shovel"	
1999	Elephant Juice	Graham	
2000	The Announcement	Richard	
2000	The Miracle Maker	Tribune	Voice
2000	Snatch	Sol	
2001	Lucky Break	Rudy "Rud" Guscott / Hardy In Show	
2001	The Martins	Police Constable Alex	
2002	24 Hour Party People	Alan Erasmus	
2003	Without You	James	Short film
2004	Frances Tuesday	Trent	
2005	Sahara	Brigadier General Zateb Kazim	
2007	Outlaw	Cedric Munroe	
2010	Mob Rules	"C-Note"	Method Fest Award for Best Ensemble Cast
2010	The Next Three Days	Lieutenant Nabulsi	
2011	Colombiana	FBI Special Agent James Ross	
2012	Lockout	Harry Shaw	
2014	Swelter	Bishop	
2014	Get On Up	Joe James	
2017	Double Play	Chamon	
2017	Blade Runner 2049	Mr. Cotton	
2021	Peter Rabbit 2: The Runaway	Barnabas	Voice
2022	There There	Restaurant Owner	
2024	The End	Doctor	
2024	Mufasa: The Lion King	Obasi	Voice
TBA	Anxious People	TBA	Post-production

=== Television ===
Year	Title	Role	Notes
1988	ScreenPlay	Writer	Episode: "Between the Cracks"
1990	The Bill	Writer	Episode: "Burnside Knew My Father"
1991	The Orchid House	Baptist	3 episodes
1992	Civvies	Cliff Morgan	6 episodes
1993	Comics	Delroy Smith	Television film
1994	A Touch of Frost	DC Carl Tanner	Episode: "A Minority of One"
1994	Love Hurts	Steve	Episode: "Parent Trap"
1995–1996	Out of the Blue	DC Bruce Hannaford	12 episodes
1998	Cold Feet	Kris Bumstead	3 episodes
1998	Undercover Heart	Matt Lomas	5 episodes
1999	Shockers: Deja Vu	Mark	Television film
2000	Storm Damage	Bonaface	Television film; also writer Nominated–BAFTA TV Award for Best Single Drama
2003	Buried	Lee Kingley	8 episodes
2004	Family Business	Roy Tobelem	Episode: "#1.1"
2004	Stealing Lives	Narrator	Television film
2005	ShakespeaRe-Told	Oberon	Episode: "A Midsummer Night's Dream"
2005	Born with Two Mothers	Errol Bridges	Television film
2006	Spooks	David Newman	Episode: "Agenda"
2006	The State Within	Luke Gardner	4 episodes
2006	The Family Man	Paul Jessop	Television film
2006–2008	Jericho	Robert Hawkins	29 episodes
2008	Fallout	DS Joe Stephens	Television film
2009	Lie to Me	Terry "Tel" Marsh	Episode: "Grievous Bodily Harm"
2009	Three Rivers	Dr Maguire	Episode: "Alone Together"
2009	The Prisoner	147	Miniseries
2009	U.S. Attorney	Eric King	Pilot
2010	Human Target	Baptiste	3 episodes
2010–2011	Hung	Charlie	14 episodes
2010; 2013–2018	The Walking Dead	Morgan Jones	35 episodes Guest (season 1); Special guest star (episode: "Clear"); Recurring (season 5, two uncredited); Main cast (seasons 6–8); Uncredited voice role (Episode: "What Comes After")
2012	Line of Duty	DCI Tony Gates	5 episodes
2013	Low Winter Sun	Joe Geddes	Main cast, 10 episodes
2013	Run	Richard	2 episodes
2015	Critical	Glen Boyle	Main cast, 13 episodes
2015; 2017	The Met: Policing London	Narrator	10 episodes
2017	Robot Chicken	Morgan Jones	Voice; episode: "The Robot Chicken Walking Dead Special: Look Who's Walking"
2018–2023	Fear the Walking Dead	Morgan Jones	Main cast, 60 episodes (seasons 4–8); Directed 3 episodes (seasons 6–7)
2018–2020	Save Me	Nelson "Nelly" Rowe	Main cast, 12 episodes Also creator and writer
2020	Unprecedented	Ray	Episode: "Penny" by Charlene James
2021	Invincible	Darkwing	Voice; episode: "It's About Time"
2023	Archer	Ibadan Peters	Voice; episode: "Plaque Removal"
2024	Genius	Martin Luther King Sr.	5 episodes
2024	Mr Loverman	Barrington Jedidiah Walker	Main role; also executive producer
2025	Mayor of Kingstown	Frank Moses	Main role; 10 episodes

=== Video games ===
Year	Title	Voice role	Notes
2014	Destiny	Lord Shaxx	
2017	Destiny 2	Lord Shaxx	
2026	007 First Light	John Greenway	Voice and likeness

=== Stage ===
Year	Title	Notes
2004	The Sons of Charlie Paora	Writer
2022	A Number	

== Awards and nominations ==
Year	Award	Category	Work	Result	Ref
2002	Black Filmmakers Magazine (BFM) Film and Television Awards	Best Male Performance in Film	Lucky Break	Won	
2013	Online Film & Television Awards	Best Guest Actor in a Drama Series	The Walking Dead	Won	
2013	Gold Derby TV Awards	Best Drama Guest Actor	The Walking Dead	Nominated	
2013	RTS Television Awards	Best Actor-Male	Line of Duty	Nominated	
2014	RTS Television Awards	Best Actor-Male	Run	Nominated	
2016	Fangoria Chainsaw Awards	Best TV Supporting Actor	The Walking Dead	Nominated	
2019	Saturn Awards	Best Supporting Actor on Television	Fear the Walking Dead	Nominated	
2022	Evening Standard Theatre Awards	Best Actor	A Number	Nominated	
2025	British Academy Television Awards	Best Actor	Mr Loverman	Won	
2025	Royal Television Society Programme Awards	Leading Actor: Male	Mr Loverman	Won	
2026	Golden Joystick Awards	Best Supporting Performer	007 First Light	Nominated	
