= Zuzu Divine =

Mexican professional wrestler

Personal information
- Born: Azucena Ángeles Flores; March 4, 1994 (age 32) Pachuca, Hidalgo, Mexico
- Children: 1

Professional wrestling career
- Ring name: Zuzu Divine
- Billed height: 1.55 m (5 ft 1 in)
- Billed weight: 51 kg (112 lb)
- Trained by: Aeroboy; Paranoico
- Debut: January 5, 2013

Azucena Ángeles Flores (born March 4, 1994, in Pachuca, Hidalgo, Mexico), better known by her ring name Zuzu Divine, is a Mexican luchadora, or female professional wrestler, currently performing as a freelancer. She has worked for promotions such as Lucha Libre AAA World Wide (AAA) and Desastre Total Ultraviolento (DTU).

Zuzu Divine previously wrestled wearing a mask, but she lost it in a four-way lucha de apuestas match won by Diosa Atenea on September 16, 2017.

== Professional wrestling career ==
Zuzu made her professional wrestling debut on January 5, 2013.

== Personal life ==
Zuzu has a daughter.

== Championships and accomplishments ==
- Desastre Total Ultraviolento
  - DTU Nexo Championship (1 time) – with Dariux

== Luchas de Apuestas record ==
Winner (wager)	Loser (wager)	Location	Event	Date	Notes
Zuzu Divine (hair)	Angel Suicida (hair)	Tulancingo, Hidalgo	Live event	September 13, 2015	
Diosa Atenea (mask)	Zuzu Divine (mask)	Arena Afición	Live event	September 16, 2017	(Note: Four way match including Lilith Dark & Dulce Luna.)
