= Zu Zu Ginger Snaps =

Brand of cookies

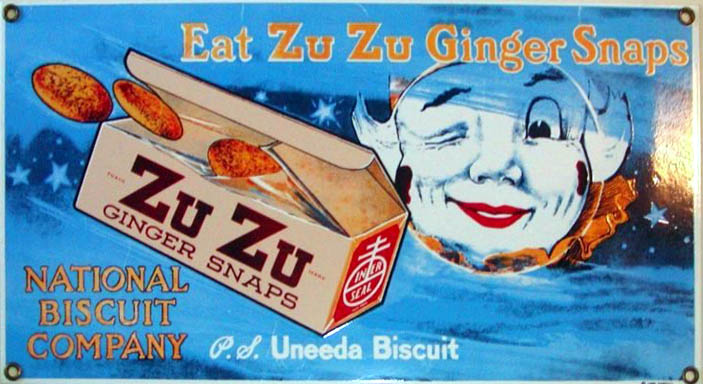
- Early 1900s ad featuring the Zu Zu Clown
- Product type: Cookie
- Country: U.S.
- Introduced: 1901; 125 years ago
- Previous owners: Nabisco

Zu Zu Ginger Snaps was a brand of round drop cookies originally manufactured in 1901 by the National Biscuit Company (NBC)—later changed to Nabisco—and produced until the early 1980s. The snaps are "a spicy combination of ginger and sugar-cane molasses" and came in a distinctive yellow box with reddish type.

== In popular culture ==
The mascot was the "Zu Zu Clown". The Clown became central to an advertising campaign which included ads, signs, free clown costumes for children and two sizes of clown dolls.

In the 1946 film It's a Wonderful Life by Frank Capra, one of George Bailey's daughters is named Zuzu after these cookies. Near the end of the film, when her dad rushes up the stairs and Zuzu greets him, he replies "Zuzu, my little ginger snap!".

In Out of the Cracker Barrel by William Cahn (a book commissioned by the National Biscuit Company), the name of the product is said to have possibly originated from a character in the play Forbidden Fruit by Dion Boucicault. Adolphus Green, NBC's first chairman, supposedly saw the play and adapted the name of the character "Zulu".
