= Ariyon Bakare =

English actor

- Born: 2 June 1971 (age 55); London, England
- Education: Drama Centre London
- Occupation: Actor
- Years active: 1990–present
- Television: Doctors; Good Omens; Carnival Row; His Dark Materials
- Height: 1.8 m (5 ft 11 in)

Ariyon Bakare (born 1 July 1971) is an English actor, writer and director. He is known for his roles in shows including Doctor Who, His Dark Materials, and Doctors.

In 1998, he became the first Black man to play a lead role in a BBC period drama, portraying Mehuru in the BAFTA-nominated miniseries A Respectable Trade. In 2025, he won the BAFTA TV Award for Best Supporting Actor for his role in Mr Loverman.

== Early life and education ==
Bakare was born on 1 July 1971 in London. He grew up in many places including the East London, Leytonstone, and Hackney with his Nigerian father who was an electrician. Growing up, he watched black and white movies with his dad which led to him having a passion for acting. When he was 15, Bakare was kicked out of his house after having conflicts with his father and spent a few years being homeless in East London.

After reconciling with his father, Bakare moved to New York City to study dance when he was 17 at the Alvin Ailey American Dance Theater. He gave up dance however after talking to a professional he respected who was retiring at an early age. Bakare went back to London at 19 to study drama at DRAMA CENTRE in Camden.

== Career ==
=== Film and television ===
Bakare had his first success in acting after landing the play Ion which also starred Jude Law.

His career in television expanded with his role as Mehuru in the BAFTA-nominated BBC A Respectable Trade. Bakare then landed a role in Doctors as Dr Ben Kwarme in 2001. Other notable shows he acted for include Thirteen (TV series), Good Omens, His Dark Materials, and Mr Loverman.

=== Stage ===
Bakare's acts include productions at the RSC, Young Vic, and the Royal Court Theatre. Among other theater credits include A Servant to Two Masters, Julius Caesar, Antony and Cleopatra, The Dream Of The Dog, The Mountaintop and God of Carnage.

== Awards and nominations ==
In 2025, Bakare won the BAFTA TV Award for Best Supporting Actor for his performance in Mr Loverman.

== Filmography ==
Year	Title	Role	Notes
1999	After the Rain	Vusisizwe (Joseph)	
1999	The Secret Laughter of Women	Rev. Fola	
1999	Dead Bolt Dead	The Thug	
2000–2001	Family Affairs	Adrian Scott	Series regular
2001–2005	Doctors	Ben Kwarme	Series regular
2006	Shoot the Messenger	Elroy	
2008	The Dark Knight	Guard Commander	
2009	Happy Ever Afters	Wilson	
2012	Full Firearms	Laslo	
2013	Lewis	Carl Drew	Episode “Intelligent Design”
2015	Jupiter Ascending	Greeghan	
2015	Jonathan Strange & Mr Norrell	Stephen Black	7 episodes
2015	Dusha shpiona	Sam	
2015	Doctor Who	Leandro	Episode: "The Woman Who Lived"
2016	Thirteen	Chief Superintendent Burridge	4 episodes
2016	Silent Witness	Father Daws	2 episodes
2016	Death in Paradise	Astor Henri	Episode: "Flames of Love"
2016	Rogue One: A Star Wars Story	Blue Four	
2017	Life	Hugh Derry	
2019	Frankie	Ian	Film
2019	Good Omens	Ligur	Miniseries
2019–2020	His Dark Materials	Lord Boreal	Main role
2019–2023	Carnival Row	Darius	Recurring role (season 1-episodes 1-5 of season 2), Main role (season 2)
2021	Too Close	Dougie Thompson	2 episodes
2022	Crossfire	Paul	2 episodes
2022	Karen Pirie	Alex Gilbie Sr.	Regular role
2022	The Amazing Maurice	Darktan	Voice
2022	Wedding Season	Vince	
2022	The Mosquito Coast	Richard	Series regular
2023	Black Ops	Detective Inspector Clinton Blair	
2024	Mr Loverman	Morris De La Roux	
2025	Doctor Who	The Barber	Episode: "The Story and the Engine"

=== Stage ===
Year	Title	Roles	Notes
2023	God of Carnage	Alan	Lyric Theatre
2025	Hamlet	Claudius	Minerva Theatre
