= 2025 Nigeria Prize for Literature =

Nigerian literary award given in 2025

- Date: 10 October 2025
- Location: Eko Hotels and Suites, Lagos
- Country: Nigeria

The 2025 Nigeria Prize for Literature is a literary award worth US$100,000 given for the best English-language novel published by a Nigerian author. The winner, Oyin Olugbile for her novel Sanya, was announced on 10 October 2025 at Eko Hotels and Suites in Lagos.

Focused on prose fiction, there were 252 entries during the submission space. The jury consisted of Saeedat Bolajoko Aliyu, the chairman, Stephen Mbanefo Ogene, and Olakunle Kasumu. On 26 July 2025, 11 books were longlisted and were announced by Akachi Adimora-Ezeigbo, the chairman of the advisory board. Chika Unigwe and Abubakar Adam Ibrahim, who won the prize in 2012 and 2016 respectively were among the longlist.

On 30 August 2025, the shortlist was released and it contained only three books; This Motherless Land by Nikki May, The Road to the Country by Chigozie Obioma and Sanya by Oyin Olugbile. On 10 October 2025, Oyin Olugbile was announced as the winner for her novel Sanya.

== Judging panel ==
- Saeedat Bolajoko Aliyu (chair)
- Stephen Mbanefo Ogene
- Olakunle Kasumu

== Nominees ==
indicates the winner
indicates shortlisted

Author	Title	Publisher
Chigozie Obioma	The Road to the Country	Random House Publishing Group
Yewande Omotoso	An Unusual Grief	Cassava Republic Press
Linda Masi	Fine Dreams	University of Massachusetts Press
Michael Afenfia	Leave My Bones in Saskatoon	Griots Lounge Canada
Uwem Akpan	New York My Village	W. W. Norton & Company
Ayo Oyeku	Petrichor: The Scent of a New Beginning	Eleventh House publishers
Chika Unigwe	The Middle Daughter	Dzanc Books
Oyin Olugbile	Sanya	Masobe Books
Chioma Okereke	Water Baby	Quercus
Abubakar Adam Ibrahim	When We Were Fireflies	Masobe Books
Nikki May	This Motherless Land	Mariner Books

== See also ==
- List of winners and nominated authors of the Nigerian Prize for Literature
