= Comedy Women in Print Prize =

Literary award

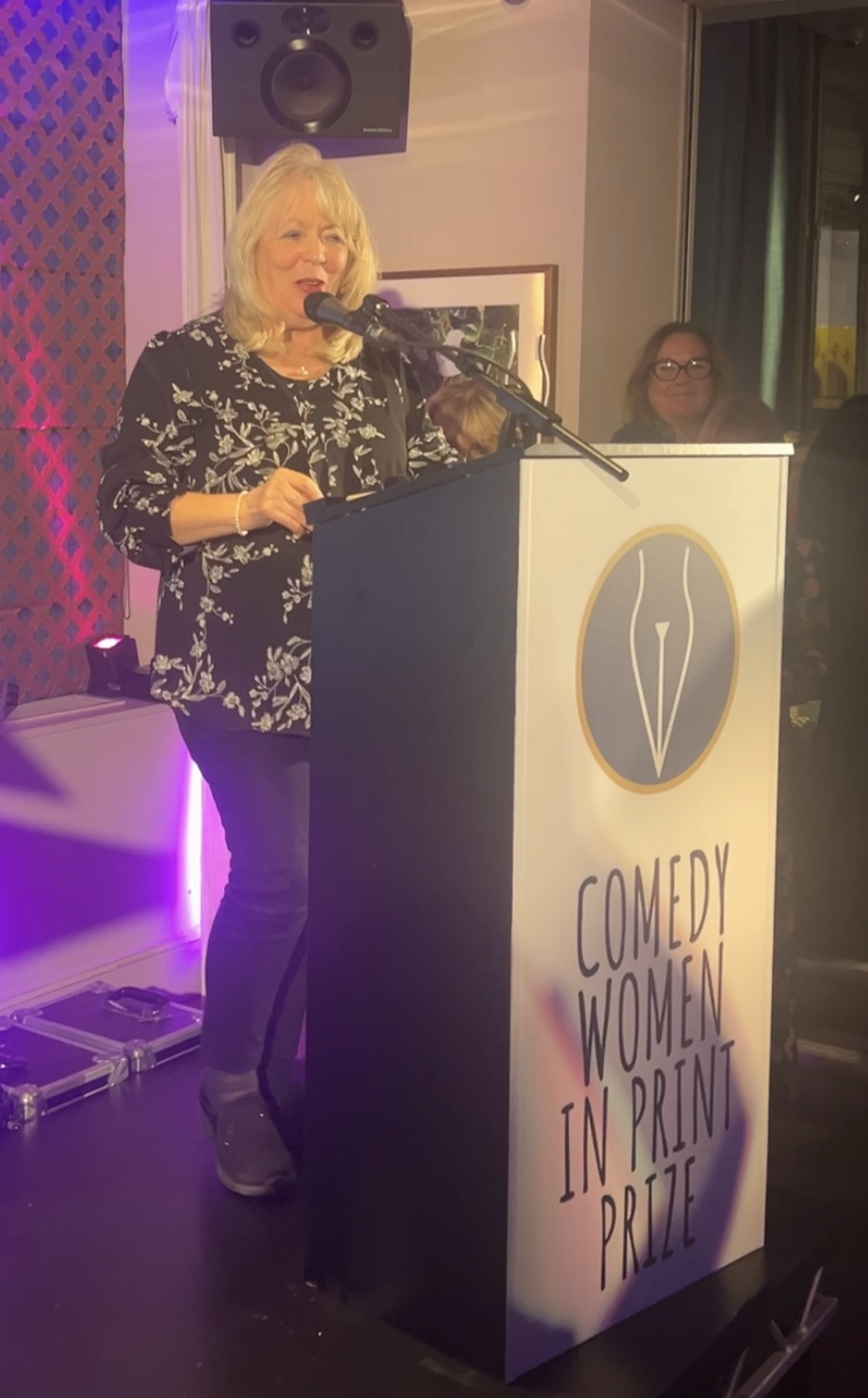
Alison Steadman receiving the Honorary Witty Impact Award, 3rd November 2025

The Comedy Women in Print Prize is a literary award for comedy novels written by women. It was founded in 2018 by Helen Lederer in response to the low number of women awarded the Bollinger Everyman Wodehouse Prize, having only been presented to three women in 18 years. However, Lederer has been careful not to describe the prize in critical terms. She also acknowledges that her status as a well-known comedian has helped draw focus onto the award.

It has been received as a positive way to shine a light on comedic novels, in an environment where publishers may regard comedy as difficult or risky.

The award started with two categories: published and unpublished novels. In 2022, an additional award was added to celebrate a debut published author. This is known as the New Voice award and commemorates the legacy of Sue Townsend.

In 2025, the award was expanded to permit self-published novels to be entered for the first time. Other new awards included in 2025 were the Jilly Cooper Award, won by Sara Pascoe; the Honorary Game Changer Award, won by Tameka Empson; and the Honorary Witty Impact Award, won by Alison Steadman.

== Past winners ==
Previous winners
Year	Category	Author	Title	Publisher	Judges
2019	Published Comedy Novel	Laura Steven	The Exact Opposite of Okay	Electric Monkey	Marian Keyes, Kathy Lette, Katy Brand, Shazia Mirza, Jenny Eclair, Allison Pearson
2019	Unpublished Comedy Novel	Kirsty Eyre	Cow Girl	HarperCollins	Fanny Blake, Susan Calman, Martha Ashby, Jennifer Young, Lara Marshall, Karen McPherson
2020	Published Comedy Novel	Nina Stibbe	Reasons to Be Cheerful	Penguin Books	Lolly Adefope, Marian Keyes, Emma Kennedy, Pauline McLynn, Joanna Scanlan, Laura Steven
2020	Unpublished Comedy Novel	Faye Brann	Tinker, Tailor, Schoolmum, Spy	HarperCollins	Yomi Adegoke, Fanny Blake, Kate Bradley, Grace Campbell, Kirsty Eyre, Jennifer Young, Rachel Ball, Dr Nicola Streeten, Janet Ellis, Hannah Berry, Jen Brister, Paula Wilcox
2020	Humorous Graphic Novel	Danny Noble	Was it… Too Much for You?		
2020	Humorous Graphic Novel	Posy Simmonds	Cassandra Darke		
2020	Flash Fiction (Women in Pants)	Lily Lindon			
2021	Published Comedy Novel	Jesse Q. Sutanto	Dial A for Aunties	HQ	Joanne Harris, Maureen Lipman, Steph McGovern, Cathy Rentzenbrink, Nina Stibbe, Susan Wokoma
2021	Unpublished Comedy Novel	Rebecca Rogers	The Purgatory Poisoning	HarperCollins	Sarah Shaffi, Martha Ashby, Faye Brann, Gloria Hunniford, Thanyia Moore, Dr Jennifer Young
2021	Flash Fiction (Comedy Cringe) (in partnership with Black Girl Writers and People in Harmony)	AJ Morris			Llewella Gideon
2022	Flash Fiction (Faux Pas Flash)	Geena Erfurth-Roberts			
2023	Published Comedy Novel	Michelle Gallen	Factory Girls	John Murray	Susie Blake, Michelle de Swarte, Anita Dobson, Angie Greaves, Jesse Q. Sutanto, Arabella Weir
2023	Unpublished Comedy Novel	Silvia Saunders	Happy Above Us re-titled Home Sick for publication	HarperCollins	Charlie George, Llewella Gideon, Liz Hoggard, Rebecca Rogers, Lucy Stewart, Jennifer Young
2023	New Voice Award	Nikki May	Wahala	John Murray	
2023	Flash Fiction (Festive Flash)	Ellie Hughes			Deborah Frances-White
2023	Comedy Short Story (in collaboration with Farago)	Paula Lennon	Sorry, Delivery		Gabby Hutchinson Crouch, Abbie Headon, Yasmeen Khan, Olga Koch, Ria Lina, Chrissie Manby
2024	Flash Fiction (Worst Winter Party)	Sadie Kaye	Emergency Party Services		
2025	Published Comedy Novel	Nussaibah Younis	Fundamentally	W&N	Chizzy Akudolu, Susannah Constantine, Kerry Godliman, Chrissie Manby, Ingrid Oliver, Ranvir Singh
2025	Unpublished Comedy Novel	Natalie Willbe	Music for the Samosa Generation		Dawn Butler, Janet Ellis, Liz Hoggard, Malaika Kegode, Keshini Naidoo, Jennifer Young
2025	Self Published Comedy Novel	Ruth Foster	A Perfect Year?	Ollerford Publishing	Llewella Gideon, Alison Hume, Lesley Joseph, Deborah Maclaren, Silvia Saunders, Nina Wadia
2025	People's Choice Award	Nussaibah Younis	Fundamentally	W&N	
2025	Commendation for Comedic Culture	Dara Lutes	Generation Ex		
2025	Honorary Game Changer Award	Tameka Empson			
2025	Honorary Witty Impact Award	Alison Steadman			
2025	Jilly Cooper Award	Sarah Pascoe	Weirdo		
