= Wahala (TV series) =

Upcoming British television thriller series

- Genre: Thriller
- Based on: Wahala by Nikki May
- Written by: Theresa Ikoko
- Directed by: Leonora Lonsdale; Theresa Ikoko; Remi Weekes
- Starring: Adelayo Adedayo; Cush Jumbo; Deborah Ayorinde; Susan Wokoma; Genevieve Nnaji
- Country of origin: United Kingdom
- Original language: English

Production
- Executive producers: Nawfal Faizullah; Elizabeth Kilgarriff; Craig Holleworth; Theresa Ikoko
- Producer: Ado Yoshizaki Cassuto

Wahala is an upcoming British thriller television series adapted by BBC from the 2022 novel Wahala by British-Nigerian author Nikki May. Its principal cast includes Adelayo Adedayo, Cush Jumbo, Deborah Ayorinde, Susan Wokoma and Genevieve Nnaji. Written by Theresa Ikoko, it follows three Nigerian-British women whose longstanding friendship is disrupted by the arrival of a wealthy and charismatic woman.

== Premise ==
Set in contemporary London, Wahala follows four Nigerian-British women in their thirties as they navigate friendship, careers, relationships and family life. The longstanding friendship between Simi, Boo and Ronke is disrupted by the arrival of Isobel, a wealthy and charismatic new acquaintance.

== Cast ==
- Adelayo Adedayo as Simi
- Cush Jumbo as Boo
- Susan Wokoma as Ronke
- Deborah Ayorinde as Isobel
- Genevieve Nnaji

== Production ==
=== Development ===
In May 2021, the BBC announced that writer Theresa Ikoko would adapt Nikki May's debut novel Wahala for television. The project was part of a slate of six dramas unveiled by the broadcaster. BBC Studios was to handle international distribution.

The series is executive produced by Nawfal Faizullah for the BBC, Elizabeth Kilgarriff and Craig Holleworth for Firebird Pictures, and Ikoko. The directors are Leonora Lonsdale, Ikoko and Remi Weekes, while Ado Yoshizaki Cassuto serves as producer. The series is intended for broadcast on BBC One and streaming on BBC iPlayer.

=== Casting ===
In May 2026, the principal cast was announced. Adelayo Adedayo, Cush Jumbo and Susan Wokoma were cast as Simi, Boo and Ronke, respectively, three longtime friends whose relationships are disrupted by the arrival of Isobel, a wealthy new acquaintance played by Deborah Ayorinde. Genevieve Nnaji also joined the cast, marking her return to on-screen acting following her appearance in the 2018 film Lionheart, which also marked her directorial debut.

=== Filming ===
The BBC announced that filming had begun in May 2026 alongside the announcement of the principal cast.
