= Oxe =

Oxe may refer to:

== People ==
- Peder Oxe (1520–1575), Danish finance minister
- Torben Oxe (died 1517), Danish nobleman
- Inger Oxe (c. 1526-1591), Danish noble lady

== See also ==
- Oxê, the double-headed battle axe of the Yoruba deity, Ṣango.
- Ox, draft animal
- Omega Chi Epsilon (sometimes simplified to OXE), American college honor society
