= Sanya (novel) =

2022 book

- Author: Oyin Olugbile
- Publisher: Masobe Books
- Publication date: December 2, 2022
- Pages: 400
- ISBN: 978-9-789-98791-7

Sanya (stylized as Sànyà) is a 2022 mythological fantasy novel and the 2025 winner of The Nigeria Prize for Literature. It is the debut novel by Nigerian author Oyin Olugbile, published by Masobe Books. The novel is a retelling of Yoruba mythology, reimagining the legacy of the male deity Ṣàngó through a powerful female protagonist.

== Synopsis ==
The story follows the journey of Sànyà and her sickly older brother, Dada. Born into a royal lineage with a prophecy of a great warrior who will either save or destroy the world, Sànyà's parents die tragically, forcing the siblings to navigate a new life.

Sànyà discovers her powers are linked to a dark prophecy she must fight to avoid. As the stronger of the two, she assumes the role of protector to her clairvoyant brother, challenging the patriarchal expectations of her society. Her attempts to forge a new identity ultimately trigger a devastating war that pits her against those she loves, including Dada, who transforms into a formidable Sorcerer King. The novel is described as a tragic epic exploring love, loss, and the corrupting nature of power.

== Recognition ==
Sànyà by Oyin Olugbile was announced as the winner of the $100,000 prize for the prose fiction cycle on October 10, 2025, beating international bestselling authors Chigozie Obioma and Nikki May on the shortlist. The advisory board, led by Professor Akachi Adimora-Ezeigbo, commended Olugbile's "distinct and daring" approach to mythology retelling and the novel's plotting and characterisation. The novel blends traditional Yoruba culture with modern fantasy, drawing comparisons to the work of Tomi Adeyemi and Nnedi Okorafor.
