= An Orchestra of Minorities =

2019 novel by Chigozie Obioma

- First edition cover
- Author: Chigozie Obioma
- Audio read by: Chuk Iwuji
- Language: English
- Publisher: Little, Brown and Company
- Publication date: January 08, 2019
- Publication place: Nigeria
- Media type: Print (Hardcover)
- Pages: 464
- ISBN: 978-0-349-14319-4

An Orchestra of Minorities is a 2019 novel by Chigozie Obioma. It is his second novel after his debut, The Fishermen. It is a modern twist of The Odyssey and Igbo cosmology. The novel's narrator is a spirit chi.

It was shortlisted for the 2019 Booker Prize.

== Plot ==
An Orchestra of Minorities is set in Umuahia, Nigeria and partly in Northern Cyprus. It follows Chinonso, a hardly surviving poultry farmer who stops a woman from taking her own life. The night changes all their lives, especially Ndali, the woman who does not carry out the intended action after much consternation and persuasion by Chinonso. They invariably fall in love after a long and frustrating courting period from the day they met. The protagonist, Chinonso ends up selling all his belongings to pursue higher education abroad to impress Ndali's parents.

He meets abject suffering in Northern Cyprus after being scammed and misled about his position at the university and his return home is further delayed by imprisonment, hence his dream of marrying Ndali is further admonished to the sidelines.

== Critical reception ==
Donna Bailey Nurse reviewing for The Boston Globe gave the novel a rave review noting that "It goes without saying, of course, that [Obioma's] tricks are not for kids and that only a master of literary form could manage to pull them off... Obioma’s choice of narrator enhances the work’s timeless quality ... In An Orchestra of Minorities, Obioma deploys whatever literary means necessary to retrieve the precious African knowledge that has been lost. It is more than a superb and tragic novel; it’s a historical treasure."

In her The Atlantic review, Hannah Giorgis writes that "In rendering his protagonist’s journey to Cyprus, and the scene that greets the unknowing Chinonso when he arrives, Obioma recasts Homer’s Odyssey. For both tales’ heroes, “mere survival is the most amazing feat of all.” But where Odysseus thrashed “under Poseidon’s blows, gale winds and tons of sea,” Chinonso is betrayed by his fellow man."

Kirkus Reviews in their review called it "A deeply original book that will have readers laughing at, angry with, and feeling compassion for a determined hero who endeavors to create his own destiny."

Eileen Battersby of The Guardian praised its language and originality, writing "Few contemporary novels achieve the seductive panache of Obioma’s heightened language, with its mixture of English, Igbo and colourful African-English phrase."
