= Shango =

Yoruba deity of thunder and 3rd Alaafin of the Oyo Empire

- Thunder; Lightning; Fire; Justice; Dance; Virility
- Member of: Irunmọlẹ; Oriṣa
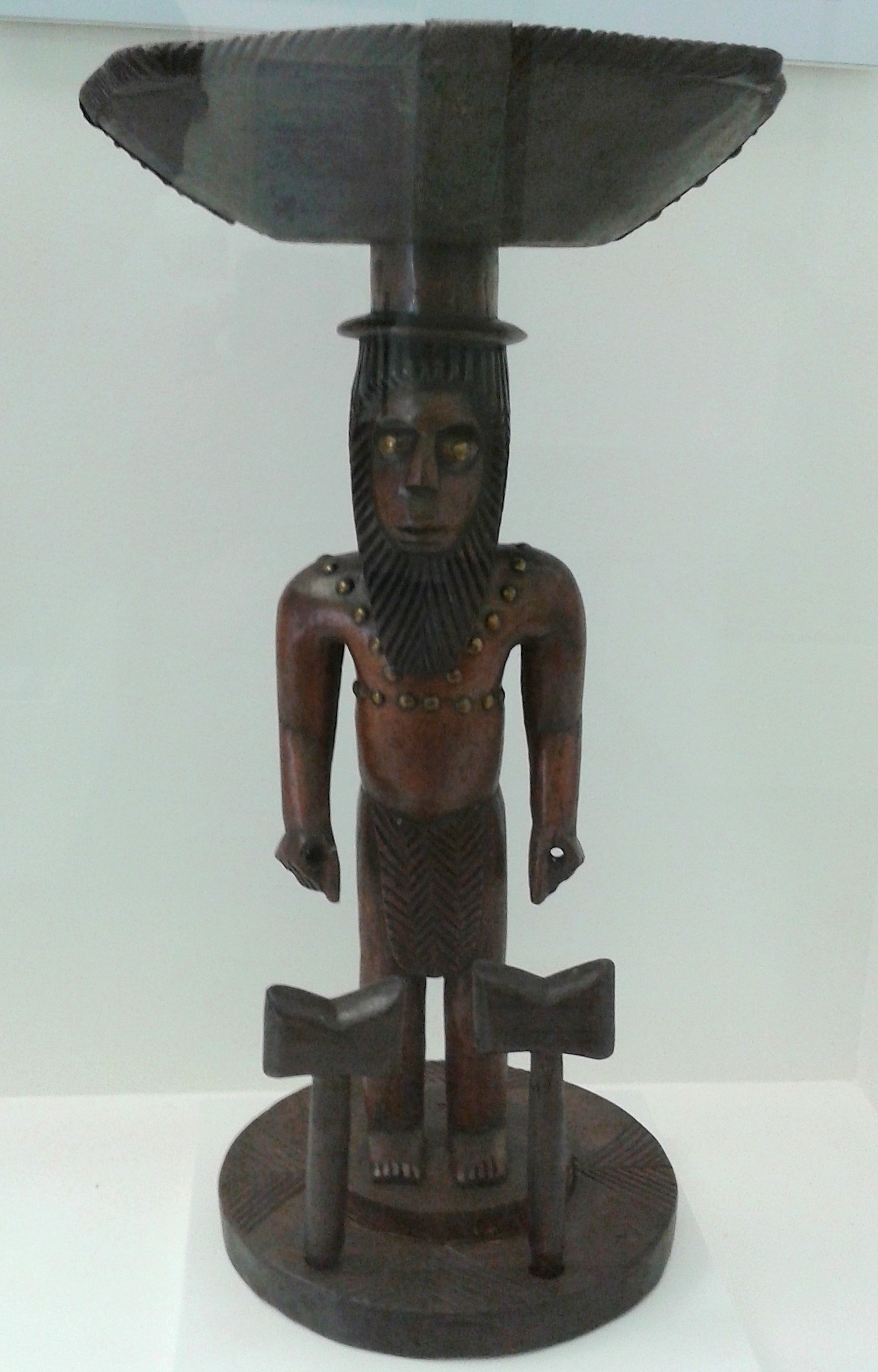
- Representation of Ṣàngó, National Museum of Brazil, Rio de Janeiro
- Other names: Sango; Ṣàngó; Changó; Xangô; Arabambi; Jakuta; Hevioso; Siete Rayos
- Venerated in: Yoruba religion, Dahomean religion, Batuque, West African Vodun, Santería, Umbanda, Candomblé, Kélé, Haitian Vodou, Arará, Louisiana Voodoo, Kumina, Trinidad Orisha, Folk Catholicism
- Major cult center: Ọyọ
- Weapons: Oṣé, thunderstone
- Day: The fourth day of the Kọjọda week; Wednesday; Friday
- Color: Red and White
- Region: Nigeria, Benin, Togo, Ghana, Latin America
- Ethnic group: Yoruba people, Fon people, Ewe people
- Temples: Casa Branca; Ilê Axé Opô Afonjá
- Festivals: Sango Festival

Genealogy
- Parents: Ọranmiyan and Torosi
- Siblings: Ajaka (brother)
- Spouse: Ọba, Ọṣun, Ọya (Note: Ọba is generally considered the first wife of Ṣango, as well as the oldest. Ọṣun is the youngest wife, but was the second to be married to him, and Ọya was the third but was older than Ọṣun and younger than Ọba.)
- Children: Ibeji

Equivalents
- Vodún: Xɛvioso
- Catholicism: Saint Barbara
- Igbo: Amadioha

Shango (Yoruba: Ṣàngó) (Note: Also known as Changó or Xangô in Latin America; as Jakuta or Badé; and as Ṣangó in Trinidad Orisha)) is the Orisha (or deity) of fire, thunder, lightning, virility, dance, drumming, strength and justice in the Yoruba religion. Genealogically, Shango is a royal ancestor of the Yoruba as he was the third Alaafin of the Oyo Empire prior to his posthumous deification. Shango is known for his double-headed battle-axe (Oṣé) and is considered to be one of the most powerful rulers in Yoruba history.

Xangô, as he is called in Candomblé and various other Afro-Brazilian religions, is believed to have numerous manifestations as various historical and legendary figures, including Ayrá, Agodo, Afonja, Lubé, and Obomin. Ayrá is derived from another deity in Yorùbáland, the personification of thunder, that is often closely associated with Ṣàngó and is called Ara (lit. 'Thunder'). (Note: Also known variously as Àìrá, Àyìrá, Àrá-gbona, Àágbona, Àrágbòóná, Àrágbòónẹ́n, Àrá Ìgbóná, Ìgbóná / Ìgbónẹ́n, and Àrá.) In the New World, he is syncretized with either Saint Barbara or Saint Jerome.

On the 17th of November, 2026, the Supreme Federal Court of Brazil unveiled a sculpture of Sango's double axe (Oxê de Xangô), adding it to one of its collections, as a national symbol of justice. Before it, the state courts of São Paulo, Rio de Janeiro, and Pernambuco had each received theirs. According to its proponents IDAFRO and the Secretariat for Equity, Diversity and Inclusion of the Supreme Federal Court, the presence of Sango's symbol in the national building of the highest court in the Brazilian judiciary represents the recognition of African-based traditions and a commitment to promoting racial equality.

== Historical figure ==
Historically, Ṣàngó was the third Alaafin of Oyo, following Oranmiyan and Ajaka. He brought prosperity to the Oyo Empire. According to Professor Mason's Mythological Account of Heroes and Kings, unlike his peaceful brother Ajaka, he was a powerful, bellicose and violent ruler. He reigned for seven years which were marked by his continuous campaigns and many battles. His reign ended due to the inadvertent destruction of his palace by lightning. He had three wives, namely Queen Oshun, Queen Ọba, and Queen Ọya.

Some of the West Africans brought to the Americas were Yoruba, one of the various nationalities drawn into the Atlantic slave trade, and they brought the worship of Ṣàngó to the New World as a result. Strong devotion to Ṣàngó led to Yoruba religions in Trinidad and Recife, Brazil being named after the deity.

== Veneration of Ṣàngó ==
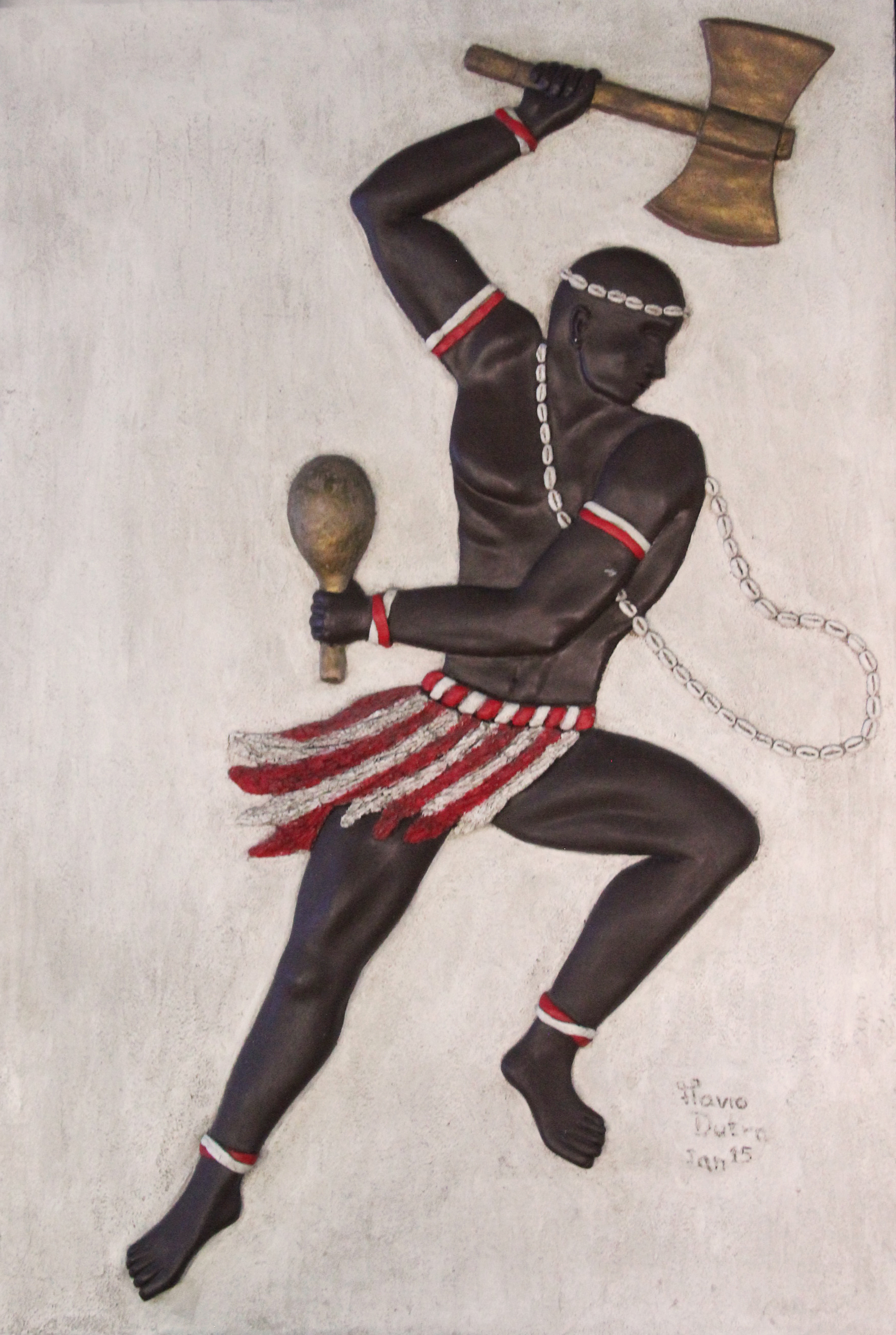
Shango painting by Flavio Dutra.

=== Yorubaland ===
Ṣàngó is viewed as one of the most powerful members of the orisha pantheon and is often described in two differing narratives. In the first narrative, Ṣàngó casts a "thunderstone" to earth, which creates thunder and lightning, to anyone who offends him. Worshippers in Yorubaland in Nigeria do not eat cowpea because they believe that the wrath of the god of thunder and lightning would descend on them. In the second narrative, Ṣàngó is gifted with the ability to breathe fire and smoke through his nostrils and is known for being angered by his quarrelsome wives. These narratives also encapsulate the virility, bravery, and governance of Ṣàngó. While he was feared for tyranny and destructive powers, he was also highly revered for his bravery, fairness, and tremendous powers.

The Ṣàngó god necklaces are composed of varying patterns of red and white beads, usually in groupings of four or six, which are his sacred numbers. Rocks created by lightning strikes are venerated by Ṣàngó worshipers; these stones, if found, are maintained at sacred sites and used in rituals. Ṣàngó is called on during coronation ceremonies in Nigeria to the present day.

In Yorubaland, Ṣàngó is worshipped on the fifth day of the week, which is named Ojo Jakuta. Ritual worship foods include guguru, bitter cola, àmàlà, and gbegiri soup. Also, he is worshipped with the Bata drum. One significant thing about this deity is that he is worshipped using red clothing, just as he is said to have admired red attire during his lifetime.

=== The Americas ===
Ṣàngó is venerated in Santería as "Changó". As in the Yoruba religion, Changó is one of the most feared gods in Santería.

In Haïti, he is from the "Nago" Nation, and is known as Ogou Chango. Palo recognizes him as "Siete Rayos".

==== Candomblé ====
Ṣàngó is known as Xangô in the Candomblé pantheon. He is said to be the son of Oranyan, and his wives include Oya, Oshun, and Oba, as in the Yoruba tradition. Xangô took on strong importance among slaves in Brazil for his qualities of strength, resistance, and aggression. He is noted as the god of lightning and thunder. He became the patron orixa of plantations and many Candomblé terreiros. In contrast Oko, the orixá of agriculture, found little favor among slaves in Brazil and has few followers in the Americas. This is likely because the enslaved had no interest in praying to Oko for bountiful harvest for their enslavers. The main barracão of Ilê Axé Iyá Nassô Oká, or the terreiro Casa Branca, is dedicated to Xangô. Xangô is depicted with an oxê, or double-sided ax similar to a labrys; and a brass crown.

==== Characteristics ====
- Consecrated day: Wednesday. December 4
- Colors: white and red
- Elements: thunder, lightning, fire
- Sacred food: amalá (a swallow food made of yam, cassava flour, or unripe plantain flour called èlùbọ́)
- Instruments: oxê, a double ax; bangles; brass crown; Thunder Stones, or objects struck by lightning
- Garment: red cloth with printed white squares or cowrie shells
- Necklace or Elekes: white and red beads
- Archetype: power, dominance
- Sacred dance: alujá, the roda de Xangô. It speaks of his achievements, deeds, consorts, power, and dominion
- Sacrificial animals: fresh water turtle, male goat, sheep

Amalá, also known as amalá de Xangô, is the ritual dish offered to the orixá. It is a stew made of chopped okra, onion, dried shrimp, and palm oil. Amalá is served on Wednesday at the pegi, or altar, on a large tray, traditionally decorated with 12 upright uncooked okra. Due to ritual prohibitions, the dish may not be offered on a wooden tray or accompanied by bitter kola. Amalá de Xangô may also be prepared with the addition of beef, specifically an ox tail. Amalá de Xangô is different than àmàlà, a dish common to Yoruba areas of Nigeria.

== In popular culture ==
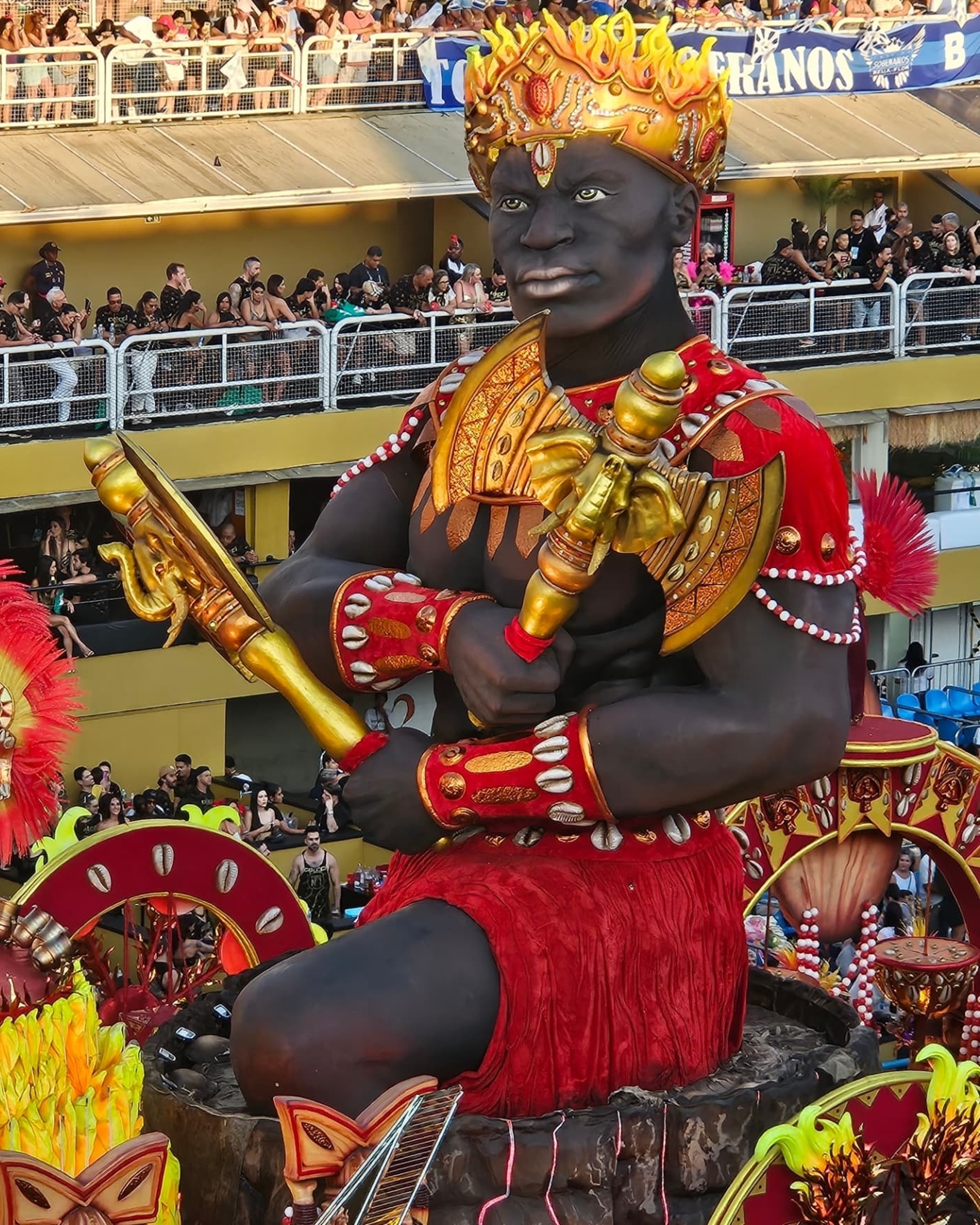
Shango float at the Parade of Champions, Rio Carnival, Sapucaí.

- "Shango (Chant to the God of Thunder)" is a track from Drums of Passion, an album released by Nigerian percussionist Babatunde Olatunji in 1960.
- "Shango" is the title of a Hugh Masekela track on his 2016 album No Borders.
- The song "Que Viva Chango" by Celina y Reutilio refers both to Chango and to Santa Barbara.
- Shangó is the thirteenth album released by the American rock band Santana.
- Shango is the main protagonist of the famous 1963 play, Ọba kò so by Duro Ladipo.
- The story of Shango was reimagined through a female protagonist in the 2022 fantasy novel Sànyà by Oyin Olugbile. The book became critically acclaimed and went on to win the 2025 Nigeria Prize for Literature.
- Shango is a large theme in the Mighty Sparrow song "Congo Man".
- Caliban invokes Shango in Aimé Césaire's play Une Tempête (A Tempest).
- The graffiti "CHANGO", written in large red letters in Herman Braun-Vega's portrait of Wifredo Lam (collection of the Centre National des Arts Plastiques), refers to Lam's African cultural heritage.
- Shango appears as a minor character in The Iron Druid Chronicles by Kevin Hearne.
- Xango is depicted as a major antagonist in the comic series The Mummy: The Rise and Fall of Xango's Ax.
- "Shango" is a bonus track on Guadalcanal Diary's album 2x4.
- Chango is portrayed by Wale in season 3 of American Gods.
- FC Shango is an American men's recreational football club based in Minnesota and was formed in 1992. Competing in the highest division in amateur soccer in Minnesota, FC Shango won the state amateur soccer tournament in 2017, and currently has three teams: MASL D2, MSSL O40, and O50. They are the 2023 over 50 Masters League champions of the Minnesota Senior Soccer League MSSL. .
- Shango is the fifth album released by the multi-genre trance group Juno Reactor.

== See also ==
- Oya
- Ogun
- Oshé
- Oriṣa

== Bibliography ==
- Johnson, Samuel, History of the Yorubas, London 1921 (pp. 149–152).
- Law, Robin: The Oyo Empire c. 1600 – c. 1836, Oxford 1977.
- Seux, M.-J., Épithètes royales akkadiennes et sumériennes, Paris 1967.
- Tishken, Joel E., Tóyìn Fálọlá, and Akíntúndéí Akínyẹmí (eds), Sàngó in Africa and the African Diaspora, Bloomington, Indiana: Indiana University Press, 2009.
