= New York My Village =

2021 novel

- Author: Uwem Akpan
- Genre: Novel
- Publisher: W. W. Norton & Company
- Publication date: November 2021

New York My Village is a 2021 satirical novel written by Nigerian author Uwem Akpan. It follows the life of Ekong Udousoro, a Nigerian editor from the minority Annang people, who comes to New York City after winning a publishing fellowship. Udousoro is curating an anthology of stories about the Nigerian Civil War from the perspectives of ethnic minorities victimized during the conflict. Udousoro's work on the anthology serves as a backdrop to his experience with prejudice as an African immigrant to America, even in supposedly anti-racist spaces. The book was described as a satire of racial bias in the publishing industry.

It was shortlisted by the Association of Nigerian Authors for the Chinua Achebe Prize for Literature in 2022, and longlisted for the 2025 Nigeria Prize for Literature.

== Background ==
Akpan took thirteen years to write the novel and thirty years of extensive research. It is partly about the brutal marginalization of minority groups in the Biafran War. Akpan has said:

I was born after the war. In 1977, when I began primary school at age six in Ekparakwa, I learnt a lot about the war. And when my family relocated to Ikot Ekpene, we even had more war "memories". As a ten-year-old, I was really frightened by stories of Biafra abducting young minority boys for their army and killing or raping those who escaped and were recaptured. They'd been branded as "saboteurs." Ikot Ekpene was a sad warfront. That was when I first learned that men could be raped. It was quite frightening to us kids because of how the adults whispered about it as absolute humiliation.

== Plot ==
New York, My Village follows Ekong Udousoro, a Nigerian Editor who travels to New York from Nigeria on a prestigious fellowship. Central to Ekong’s fellowship is his work curating an anthology of stories about the Biafran War (the Nigerian Civil War, 1967 to 1970). As a member of the Annang people tribe, a minority group caught between larger warring factions, Ekong uses the project to give voice to those often ignored in official historical narratives. The novel weaves together his current struggles in New York with haunting memories and historical passages about the war’s atrocities back home. Despite his professional credentials, Ekong faces demeaning interviews and bureaucratic hurdles at the American embassy in Nigeria, only obtaining the visa after his American editor-in-chief intervenes. Upon arriving in Manhattan, Ekong’s expectations of a glamorous New York are quickly upended by several challenges.

== Legacy ==
=== Critical reception ===
Oprah Daily describes New York, My Village as one of the best 20 books of 2021 stating that the novel: “satirizes the self-serious book publishing business,” while also noting that Akpan’s satiric first novel “is both hilarious and spot on.”

Regarding racism in publishing, Jo Hamya of The New York Times wrote that "Akpan's examination of the publishing industry serves less to mock and more to chart the ways in which narrative is essential in the forming of cultural groups. New York, My Village succeeds in making the too-rare observation that identity exists not as a fixed, individual thing, but in relation to others, and thus is constantly shifting.

Sylva Nze Ifedigbo of The Lagos Review said that the novel "brings something extra to the table of the civil war discussion by travelling a route less taken, shining the spotlight on the experiences of minority ethnic groups in Biafra and bringing to the fore, for the first time, at least to this reader, the bloody ethnic conflict that ragged at this period, the memories of which like the war itself, still haunts and which will continue to shape the dynamics of peace in the country, over fifty years after the war."

Ainehi Edoro of Brittle Paper said of the book that "The official narratives tend to stage the war as an epic battle between the newly formed Biafra and Nigeria, which, when viewed through the lens of ethnicity, corresponds to Igbo, on the one hand, Hausa and Yoruba, on the other. ... Apkan's work is unique in the way it addresses the experiences of the descendants of those who lived through the war, how they grapple with lingering traumas, as well as deal with the silences and competing narratives around the war. For tackling these questions and offering a different facet of the Biafran War, New York, My Village pairs brilliantly with Adichie's Half of a Yellow Sun and Chinua Achebe's There Was a Country".

== Awards ==
- Long-listed for the CORA and NLNG prize 2025.
- Shortlisted for the 2022 ANA Chinua Achebe Prize for Literature.
- Long-listed for the 2025 Nigeria Prize for Literature.
