= Fine Dreams =

2024 book

- Author: Linda N. Masi
- Language: English
- Published: 2024
- Publisher: University of Massachusetts Press
- Publication place: United States, Nigeria
- ISBN: 9781685750671
- OCLC: 1406102734

Fine Dreams is a 2024 debut novel by Nigerian writer Linda N. Masi. Published by the University of Massachusetts Press, the novel was longlisted for the 2025 Nigeria Prize for Literature.

== Reception ==
The Lagos Review
