= Llewella Gideon =

British actress, comedian and writer (born 1967)

- Born: 27 September 1967 (age 58); Peckham, South London, England
- Occupations: Actress, comedian, author

Llewella Gideon (born 27 September 1967) is a British actress, comedian and writer.

== Early life ==
Gideon was born on 27 September 1967 in Peckham, South London to a Saint Lucian mother and Dominican father. As a child, she attended Lyndhurst Primary School in neighbouring Camberwell and Haberdashers' Aske's Hatcham College in New Cross.

Even as a youngster, Gideon was drawn to acting and writing, and her mother encouraged her interests by enrolling her in Saturday classes at the Italia Conti Academy of Theatre Arts.

== Career ==
Gideon has appeared in a number of comedy series, including Absolutely Fabulous, The Real McCoy, The Crouches, and The Delivery Man, and provided the UK voice of Molly and Trix in Bob the Builder.

Gideon wrote and starred in the radio series The Little Big Woman, which ran on BBC Radio 4 from 2001 to 2003. The show was awarded the Critics' Choice by both The Times and The Guardian.

In 2024, Gideon starred as Miss Drusilla in the BBC drama Mr Loverman.

In 2025, Gideon was one of the judges of the 'Self-Published Novel' category of the Comedy Women in Print Prize.
