= Say You're One of Them =

2008 short stories collection by Uwem Akpan

- First US edition
- Author: Uwem Akpan
- Language: English
- Genre: Short Stories
- Publisher: Abacus (UK); Little, Brown (US)
- Publication date: 2008
- Publication place: Nigeria
- Media type: Print (paperback)
- Pages: 294
- ISBN: 9780349120638

Say You're One of Them (2008) is the debut book by Nigerian writer Uwem Akpan. First published in English in the United Kingdom and United States, it is a collection of five stories or novellas, each featuring children at risk and set in a different African country.

In 2009, Say You're One of Them won the 2009 Commonwealth Writers Prize (African region), the PEN/Beyond Margins Award (now the PEN Open Book Award), and the Hurston/Wright Legacy Award (Fiction). It was translated into twelve languages and listed as a No. 1 bestseller by The New York Times and the Wall Street Journal.

== Stories ==
- "An Ex-Mas Feast" : is told from the viewpoint of a young boy living in a poor family in a Nairobi slum. His mother gives him glue to sniff to quell his hunger. His 12-year-old sister works as a prostitute to support the family and contemplates deserting her desperate, failing relatives.
- "Fattening for Gabon": is a novella set in a small sea-side town on the outskirts of Lagos, near the border between Nigeria and Benin. It features a 10-year-old boy (who narrates) and his younger sister, whose parents have died of AIDS. Initially glad to be taken in by their uncle, the boy slowly begins to realize that he and his sister are to be sold into slavery. The payment, a new motorbike, has already been delivered, and the deal cannot be cancelled.
- "My Parents' Bedroom": set in 1994 Rwanda and written in the first person. A young girl tells of her Tutsi mother and some neighbours hiding in the ceiling of her parents' room. Outside, her Hutu father participates with other Hutu adults, neighbours and strangers alike, in brutal killing in an effort to protect his own family.
- "Luxurious Hearses": this novella features a Muslim boy in Nigeria, disguised as a Christian, attempting to make his way on a bus filled with Christians from the North to the South of the country in the midst of mass religious riots by Muslims against Christians.
- "What Language is That?": Two young girls in Ethiopia, one Christian, one Muslim, are forced to break their friendship as religious tensions explode in their community.

== Reception ==
Oprah Winfrey said, "In over 60 books I have never chosen a collection of short stories because usually short stories leave you wanting something. This is a first for me because each one of these five stories just left me gasping.”

Maureen Corrigan of NPR said, "Akpan's brilliance is to present that brutal subject [partisan hatred] through the bewildered, resolutely chipper voice of children; he never succumbs to the temptation of making his narrators endearing or overly innocent. They've seen too much to pretend purity."

Susan Straight of Washington Post Book World said, "It is not merely the subject that makes Akpan’s writing so astonishing, translucent, and horrifying all at once; it is his talent with metaphor and imagery, his immersion into character and place... Uwem Akpan has given these children their voices, and for the compassion and art in his stories I am grateful and changed.”

Deirdre Donahue of USA Today said, “Brilliant... Say You’re One of Them proves that great fiction often can reveal more truth than a whole shelf of memoirs and histories."

== Awards and honours ==
- 2008 Guardian First Book Award longlist
- 2008 Los Angeles Times Book Prize finalist (Art Seidenbaum Award for First Fiction)
- 2009 Winner, Commonwealth Writers' Prize (Best First Book, Africa)
- 2009 Dayton Literary Peace Prize Runner-Up
- 2009 Winner, Hurston/Wright Legacy Award (Fiction)
- 2009 Winner, PEN/Beyond Margins Award (since 2010 known as PEN Open Book Award)
