= Kole Omotoso =

Nigerian writer (1943–2023)

- Born: Bankole Ajibabi Omotoso; 21 April 1943; Akure, Colony and Protectorate of Nigeria
- Died: 19 July 2023 (aged 80); Johannesburg, South Africa
- Other names: Kole Omotoso; Bankole Omotoso
- Education: King's College, Lagos; University of Ibadan; University of Edinburgh; American University in Cairo
- Occupations: Writer, public intellectual
- Notable work: Just Before Dawn (1988); Season of Migration to the South (1994)
- Children: Incl. Akin Omotoso and Yewande Omotoso

Bankole Ajibabi Omotoso (21 April 1943 – 19 July 2023), also known as Kole Omotoso, was a Nigerian writer and intellectual best known for his works of fiction and in South Africa as the "Yebo Gogo man" in adverts for the telecommunications company Vodacom. His written work is known for its dedication and commitment to fusing a socio-political reappraisal of Africa and respect for human dignity into most of his works.

== Early life and education ==
Kole Omotoso was born into a Yoruba family in Akure, Ondo State, Colony and Protectorate of Nigeria. He was raised by his mother and maternal grandparents after the death of his father. The events of his early childhood contributed a great deal to his development as a man and also as a writer. Omotoso was educated at King's College, Lagos, going on to earn a degree from the University of Ibadan in 1969. He won a scholarship to study for a doctorate in Arabic Literature at the University of Edinburgh and the American University in Cairo, Egypt, writing his thesis on the modern Arabic writer Ahmad Ba-Kathir.

== Later life and death ==
Omotoso returned to Ibadan to lecture in the department of Arabic and Islamic studies (1972–1976), then moved to the University of Ife to work in drama (1976–1988). He was founding general secretary of the Association of Nigerian Authors (ANA), established in 1981, and subsequently took over from Chinua Achebe as the organisation's president (1986–1988). During his tenure, Omotoso "demonstrated unwavering dedication to ANA's mission of fostering a dynamic community of creative writers, founded on the principles of free expression and ethical integrity."

He became a writer for various magazines (including West Africa) in the 1970s and was well known among Nigeria's literate elites. His major themes include interracial marriage, comic aspects of the Biafran-Nigerian conflict, and the human condition—as exemplified in friendship between the Yoruba and the Igbo and in relationships between children and parents.

His 1988 historical novel about Nigeria, Just Before Dawn (Spectrum Books), was controversial and led Omotoso to leave his native country. After visiting professorships in English at the University of Stirling and the National University of Lesotho and a spell at the Talawa Theatre Company, London, he became a professor of English at the University of the Western Cape in South Africa (1991–2000). From 2001 to 2003, he was a professor in the Drama Department at Stellenbosch University. Omotoso then returned to Nigeria, continuing his academic career teaching at Elizade University, Ilara-Mokin, Ondo State, until his retirement in 2017.

Omotoso also wrote a number of columns in African newspapers, most notably the "Trouble Travels" column in the Nigeria's Sunday Guardian. From 2013 to 2016, he was a patron of the Etisalat Prize for Literature (alongside Ama Ata Aidoo, Dele Olojede, Ellah Allfrey, Margaret Busby and Zakes Mda).

In the mid-1990s and 2010s, Omotoso appeared as the "Yebo Gogo man" in a number of television advertisements for Vodacom mobile phones, which led him to being described by Nelson Mandela, whom he first met in 1991, as "the most photographed man in South Africa". In the 1997 television drama film Mandela and de Klerk, Omotoso was cast as Govan Mbeki, Mandela's fellow prisoner on Robben Island.

Omotoso lived in Centurion, Gauteng, South Africa. With his first wife, the late Marguerita Rice – an architect and urban planner, originally from Barbados – he had three children: engineer Pelayo Omotoso, filmmaker Akin Omotoso and writer Yewande Omotoso. His second marriage was to Bukky Omotoso.

Kole Omotoso died after a long period of illness on 19 July 2023, at the age of 80, in Johannesburg, as reported by his son Akin.

== Themes ==
Omotoso grew up during the rising tide of radical nationalism and was enamored by the potential that lay in the future of his country. His fiction ranges widely over the human condition, and themes include intergenerational and interracial relationships. Recalling taking on Omotoso's first two books for the Heinemann African Writers Series, publisher James Currey said: "His writing had style and elegance and gave one hopes that here was a new voice from Africa." Omotoso's 1974 novel Fella's Choice is an early example of Nigerian detective fiction. However, with the ascent of social and political decay, a few years after independence, he became deeply interested in writing about fiction. Fiction was an avenue that exists apart from the decay of real life and where deep reconstructions about life and ideas come true. It was also an avenue to experiment on social and political ideas for societal change and advancement. Omotoso's non-fiction is wide-ranging in subject matter.

Among Omotoso's best known works are Just Before Dawn (1988), characterised as a "masterpiece of the hybrid genre of 'faction'", and Season of Migration to the South (1994), "a searing political and intellectual reminiscence on the historic emergence of the Nigerian Diaspora in Africa and the rest of the world." Other titles considered significant include The Edifice and The Combat, and Toyin Falola observes: "Each piece of his work thoroughly analyses the human condition by digging into topics such as personal identity, cultural dynamics, and the intricacies inherent in post-colonial African society."

== Works ==
=== Fiction ===
- The Edifice (Heinemann African Writers Series, Heinemann Educational Books, 1971, ISBN 9780435906351)
- The Combat (Heinemann African Writers Series, 1972; Penguin Classics, 2008, ISBN 978-0143185536)
- Miracles (short stories) (Onibonoje Press, 1973)
- Fella's Choice (Ethiope Publishing Corporation, 1974)
- Sacrifice (Onibonoje Press, 1974, 1978)
- The Scales (Onibonoje Press, 1976)
- To Borrow a Wandering Leaf (1978)
- Memories of Our Recent Boom (Longman, 1982, ISBN 9780582785724)
- Just Before Dawn (Spectrum Books, 1988, ISBN 9789782460073)

=== Drama ===
- The Curse: A One Act Play in Four Scenes (New Horn Press, 1976)
- Shadows in the Horizon: A Play about the Combustibility of Private Property (Sketch Publishing Company, 1977)

=== Non-fiction ===
- The Form of the African Novel: A Critical Essay (1979 etc.)
- The Theatrical Into Theatre: a study of the drama and theatre of the English-speaking Caribbean (New Beacon Books, 1982, ISBN 9780901241429)
- Season of Migration to the South: Africa's crises reconsidered (Tafelberg, 1994, ISBN 9780624032717)
- Achebe or Soyinka? A Study in Contrasts (Hans Zell Publishers, 1995, ISBN 9780905450384)
- Woza Africa (1997)
