= An Unusual Grief =

2022 novel by Yewande Omotoso

- Author: Yewande Omotoso
- Language: English
- Publisher: Cassava Republic Press
- Publication date: 2022

An Unusual Grief is a 2022 novel written by Yewande Omotoso and published by Cassava Republic Press. Set in Johannesburg and Cape Town, South Africa, the novel narrates the experience of Mojisola as she tries to trace the life of her daughter who has committed suicide. The review in The Guardian notes: "An Unusual Grief reveals itself as a beautiful book that offers emotional truth to its readers, and a feeling of consolation for the imperfections we are all making our peace with, all the time."

It was among the Longlist of the 2025 Nigeria Prize for Literature.
