= Nussaibah Younis =

English author (born 1986)

- Born: August 1986 (age 40); Manchester, England
- Education: Merton College, Oxford; Durham University
- Years active: 2012–present

Nussaibah Younis (born August 1986) is an English writer, academic and former consultant and humanitarian worker known for her expertise on contemporary Iraq. Her debut novel Fundamentally (2025) won a Comedy Women in Print Prize among other accolades.

== Early life ==
Younis was born in Manchester to an Iraqi father and a Pakistani mother and grew up in a Muslim household in Manchester and Leeds. The 2003 invasion of Iraq had a "huge impact" on her family. She attributes her career and journey to her desire to help and learn more about her father's country. Younis attended Altrincham Grammar School for Girls, completing her A Levels in 2004. She graduated with a Bachelor of Arts (BA) in Modern History and English from Merton College, Oxford. During her time at Oxford, she became features editor of Cherwell. She went on to complete a Master of Arts (MA) and a PhD in International Affairs at Durham University.

== Career ==
After completing her Durham PhD, Younis undertook a post-doctoral fellowship at the Belfer Center for Science and International Affairs. She then worked at the Atlantic Council as director of the Future of Iraq Task Force. As of 2018, she was a Senior Fellow and Advisor to the European Institute of Peace. She was also an Associate Fellow of Chatham House and a Visiting Fellow of the European Council on Foreign Relations.

From 2019 to 2020, through a non-profit organisation, Younis was an adviser to the Iraqi government on and designer of deradicalisation programmes for women allegedly involved with the Islamic State. It was here Younis became inspired to write her debut novel; she empathised with the teenage girls and saw her younger self in them. In an eight-way auction in February 2024, Weidenfeld & Nicolson won the rights to publish Younis' debut novel Fundamentally in a two-book deal. The U.S. publishing rights simultaneously went to Tiny Reparations. Younis had turned down a non-fiction deal, as she felt a non-fiction book on the subject would only appeal to her colleagues and she wanted her work to be enjoyable to a wider audience. She sought to balance comedic elements with serious topics and to satirise international aid in the line of Evelyn Waugh's Scoop (1938) and the BBC Two sitcom W1A, taking a comedy class to hone her skills. Published in February 2025 and set in 2017, the novel follows academic Nadia Amin as she takes a job rehabilitating ISIS women amid turmoil in her personal life and meets Sara, a Londoner who ran away at age 15.

Fundamentally won the Published Novel and Readers' Choice categories at the 2025 Comedy Women in Print Prize. It was shortlisted for the 2025 Women's Prize for Fiction, the 2025 Books Are My Bag Readers' Awards and the 2025 Bollinger Everyman Wodehouse Prize. Younis was named one of the 10 best new novelists of 2025 by The Observer. She was also nominated for The Times Breakthrough Prize at the 2025 Sky Arts Awards. Younis is in the process of adapting Fundamentally for television and writing her second novel.

== Personal life ==
Younis lives in Highbury, North London. She is no longer religious.

== Bibliography ==
- Fundamentally (2025)

== Accolades ==
Year	Award	Category	Title	Result	Ref.
2025	Women's Prize for Fiction		Fundamentally	Shortlisted	
2025	Sky Arts Awards	The Times Breakthrough Prize		Nominated	
2025	Wilbur Smith Adventure Writing Prize	Published Novel	Fundamentally	Shortlisted	
2025	Books Are My Bag Readers' Awards	Fiction	Fundamentally	Shortlisted	
2025	Bollinger Everyman Wodehouse Prize		Fundamentally	Shortlisted	
2025	Comedy Women in Print Prize	Published Novel	Fundamentally	Won	
2025	Comedy Women in Print Prize	Readers' Choice	Fundamentally	Won	
2026	British Book Awards	Debut Book of the Year	Fundamentally	Shortlisted	
