= Water Baby (novel) =

2024 novel by Chioma Okereke

- Author: Chioma Okereke
- Language: English
- Publisher: Quercus
- Publication date: 2024

Water Baby is a 2024 novel by Nigerian author Chioma Okereke, published by Quercus. The novel tells the story of a 19-year-old girl called Baby, who struggles to meet her dream in a rural community Makoko in Lagos, Nigeria.

Okereke was inspired by Makoko, a rural town in Nigeria. The town was the subject of her novel and she founded Makoko Pearls, a charitable organisation to aid the inhabitants of the town.

Water Baby was longlisted for the 2025 Nigeria Prize for Literature.
