= Deborah Ayorinde =

English actress (born 1987)

- Born: Deborah Olayinka Ayorinde; 13 August 1987 (age 39); London, England
- Education: Howard University
- Occupation: Actor
- Years active: 2010–present

Deborah Olayinka Ayorinde (born 13 August 1987) is a British-Nigerian actress raised in the United States. She is known for her role in the Amazon Prime horror series Them.

== Early life and education ==
Ayorinde was born in London, England to Yoruba Nigerian parents. She spent her childhood in London before relocating to San Jose, California when she was 8.

In May 2009, she graduated with honors from Howard University's John H. Johnson School of Communications with a Bachelor of Arts in Film Production. During her time at Howard, she won the coveted Paul Robeson Best Actress award for her performance in a short film she wrote and directed. The film also won the award for Best Cinematography.

== Acting career ==
Ayorinde's resume includes her work on Netflix's popular Marvel series Luke Cage, and as Simone (the “other woman”) in the American comedy film, Girls Trip. She starred opposite Cynthia Erivo and Janelle Monáe in Harriet, a biopic of African American abolitionist and political activist Harriet Tubman, and she also starred in a season of HBO's True Detective.

In 2019, it was announced that she had joined the cast of Amazon Prime's Them for which Ayorinde received rave reviews for her portrayal of the character, Livia "Lucky" Emory. She received an Independent Spirit Award nomination for her performance.

In the same year, it was also announced that she had been added to the cast of Fatherhood. In June 2021, Fatherhood debuted at Number 1 on Netflix in both the United States and the United Kingdom.

She gained further popularity through her work on the ITV series Riches which debuted in 2022 to much acclaim. It resonated with audiences due the storyline being centered around the black British experience.

In 2024, it was announced she would appear as the lead female in a play Wedding Band: A Love Hate Story in Black and White in Lyric Theatre in London.

== Filmography ==
=== Film and TV Movies ===
Year	Title	Role	Notes
2014	She Believes	Pearl	Short
2015	Bad Asses on the Bayou	Taryn	Video
2016	Barbershop: The Next Cut	Marquita	
2016	Bad Dad Rehab	Regina	TV movie
2017	Where Is Kyra?	DMV Attendant	
2017	The Wizard of Lies	Salon Receptionist	TV movie
2017	Girls Trip	Simone	
2019	Harriet	Rachel Ross	
2020	Always and Forever	Sommer	
2021	Fatherhood	Liz	
2023	Chasing the Night	Fatimah	Short
2024	Sense and Sensibility	Elinor Dashwood	Hallmark

=== Television ===
Year	Title	Role	Notes
2010	Meet the Browns	Chloe	Episode: "Meet the Consequences"
2011	Necessary Roughness	Rochelle	Episode: "Spinning Out"
2012	The Game	Jennifer	Episode: "Grand Opening, Grand Closing"
2014	Survivor's Remorse	Heather	Episode: "How to Build a Brand"
2014	Constantine	Officer Sullivan	Episode: "Rage of Caliban"
2015	Sleepy Hollow	Michelle	Episode: "Awakening"
2015	Complications	Kate	Episode: "Relapse"
2016	Game of Silence	Young Nurse Amy Reese	Episode: "Blood Brothers" & "Ghosts of Quitman"
2016	Luke Cage	Candace Miller	Recurring cast: Season 1
2017	The Affair	Jessa	Episode: "Episode #3.8"
2019	True Detective	Becca Hays	Recurring cast: Season 3
2019	The Village	Dana	Recurring cast
2021–2024	Them	Livia 'Lucky' Emory / Detective Dawn Reeves	Main cast
2021	Truth Be Told	Rose	Recurring cast: season 2
2022	Riches	Nina Richards	Main cast
2026	Fightland	Joy Marshall	
2027	Wahala		6 episodes

== Awards and nominations ==
Year	Award	Category	Nominated work	Result	Ref.
2022	Independent Spirit Awards	Best Female Performance in a Scripted Series	Them	Nominated	
