= The Woman Next Door (novel) =

2016 novel by Yewande Omotoso

- Author: Yewande Omotoso
- Language: English
- Set in: Cape Town, South Africa
- Published: 2016
- Publisher: Chatto and Windus (UK); Picador (US); Farafina (Nigeria); Penguin Random House (South Africa)
- Pages: 304
- ISBN: 978-0008203566
- Preceded by: Bom Boy
- Followed by: An Unusual Grief

The Woman Next Door is a 2016 novel written by Yewande Omotoso. It is Omotoso's second novel, and her first to be published in the US. The story focuses on two elderly widows in Cape Town, one black and one white, who begin as acrimonious neighbors but come to know each other better after an accident. The novel was first conceived in 2012, and draws on Omotoso's research on Apartheid in South Africa and Jewish history in Cape Town. Thematically, the novel combines a serious examination of post-Apartheid reconciliation with witty debates between its characters.

== Plot summary ==
The novel is set in South Africa. The story revolves around the lives of two women, both widows in their 80s: Hortensia James, an international fashion designer who is the only black homeowner in the suburb, and Marion Agostino, a white Jewish woman who is an architect. Hortensia and Marion are neighbors in the fictional affluent neighbourhood of Katterjin in Cape Town. However, their contrasting backgrounds and personalities create a tension-filled dynamic between them. After an accident renders one of them immobile, they discuss their pasts, their regrets, and their shared experiences, leading to a deeper understanding of each other's lives and struggles.

== Development and publication ==
Omotoso found inspiration for one of the characters, Hortensia, at the funeral of her grandfather in Barbados in 2012. During this trip, she spoke with her grandmother and began reflecting on the experience of old age. She started writing the novel between 2013 and 2014. In preparation, Omotoso conducted interviews, read news from the Cape Argus and Cape Times during the period of Apartheid in South Africa and spent time in a Jewish old-people's home in Cape Town, as well as visiting District Six Museum, the Jewish Museum and the Slave Lodge.

The Woman Next Door was published in 2016 by Chatto and Windus in the United Kingdom, Picador in the United States, Farafina in Nigeria and Penguin Random House in South Africa. It was Omotoso's second novel and her first to be published in the US.

== Style and themes ==
Hortensia and Marion's conflicts over the course of the novel, according to Danette Frederique, serve to reveal "the skeletons in South Africa's post-Apartheid closet, including land rights, reconciliation and white guilt". Regarding the novel's treatment of poet-Apartheid reconciliation, Omotoso said "I didn't want to write a book with a very simple, happy ending ... I think it's important to remember, as we connect and repair, that it's delicate."

The plot of the novel, including the revelation of secrets, proceeds slowly and gradually. Despite its serious themes, it incorporates lighter storylines and a sense of humor. It has been described as "wickedly funny," especially for the verbal sparring between Marion and Hortensia.

== Reception ==
Publishers Weekly referred to it as "this charming, touching, occasionally radiant tale of two prickly octogenarians: two women, one black and one white, neighbours who discover after 20 years of exchanging digs and insults that they might help each other... Omotoso captures the changing racial relations since the 1950s, as well as the immigrant experience through personal detail and small psychological insights into mixed emotions, the artist's eye, and the widow's remorse. Hers is a fresh voice as adept at evoking the peace of walking up a kopje as the cruelty of South Africa's past." The Irish Independent described it as "a finely observed account of female prejudice, redemption and that often elusive commodity – friendship." Kirkus Reviews called the book "[a] pleasing tale of reconciliation laced with acid humor and a cheery avoidance of sentimentality." Olatoun Williams of Borders Literature Online called it "a thought provoking, and immensely readable fictional biography."

In The Harvard Crimson, it received a 3.5 star rating, citing that it "reads more like a beach book than a serious piece of literature, the novel's discussion of difficult topics such as racism, apartheid, grief, and the past add a depth that a lesser novel would lack", while Freya Neason of Palatinate gave a less positive review, citing as shortcomings the storyline, writing style and the characters' "constant grumbles and criticisms quickly [becoming] cumbersome".

The Woman Next Door was shortlisted for the University of Johannesburg Prize in 2016 and the Sunday Times Barry Ronge Fiction Prize in 2017, was longlisted for the 2017 Bailey's Women's Prize for Fiction, and went on to be shortlisted for the 2018 International Dublin Literary Award.
