= The Road to the Country =

2024 book

- Author: Chigozie Obioma
- Publication date: 2024

The Road to the Country is a 2024 novel by Chigozie Obioma. It was shortlisted for the 2025 Nigeria Prize for Literature.
