= This Motherless Land =

2024 novel by Nigerian author Nikki May

- Author: Nikki May
- Language: English
- Publication date: 2024

This Motherless Land (ISBN 9780063084292) is a 2024 novel by Nigerian author Nikki May. It was shortlisted for the 2025 Nigeria Prize for Literature. It was first published on 29 October 2024 by Mariner Books and later in Nigeria by the Narrative Landscape Press. The novel describes the life of Funke Oyenega, the child of two educators in Lagos, in the 1970s as she is forced to deal with the loss of her mother and life after being taken to Somerset.

== Reception ==
This Motherless Land was reviewed in the September 15, 2024 issue of Kirkus Reviews, where it was described as "[a] meaningful modern tale of becoming, belonging, and the ties that bind." Wardah Abbas reviewed the book for The Journal of African Youth Literature and found the plot simplistic and several characters to be "like cardboard cutouts", but appreciated the book's length, relatability, approach to hard-hitting issues and well-rounded portrayal of its setting, giving it a score of 4 out of 5. Writing for Open Country Mag, Paula Willie-Okafor found the book entertaining and heart-wrenching, though some critical moments were described as "rushed". She noted a distinct and uncharacteristic lack of complexity in the character of Aunt Margot. In Afrocritik, Chimezie Chika described This Motherless Land as "a poignant novel about the trials of hyphenated identities" and "about places and the power they hold over who we become or do not become."
