= Laura Steven =

English novelist

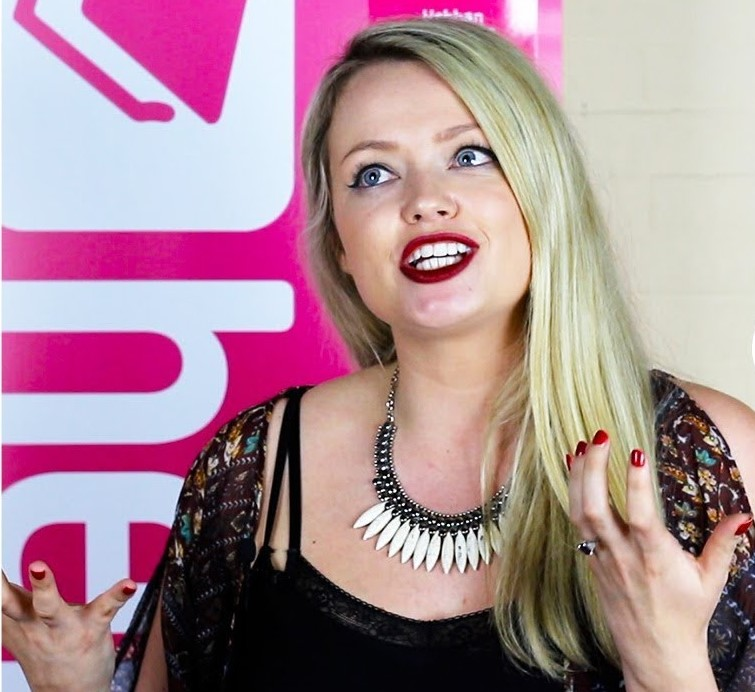
- Steven in 2018
- Born: 1991 (age 34–35)
- Education: Northumbria University
- Occupation: Novelist
- Writing career
- Pen name: Laura Salters; Laura Kirkpatrick; L. K. Steven
- Years active: 2015–present
- Website: laura-steven.com

Laura Steven (born 1991; also known as Laura Salters, L. K. Steven, or Laura Kirkpatrick) is an English novelist. She won the inaugural Comedy Women in Print Prize for her novel The Exact Opposite of Okay (2018). Our Infinite Fates (2025) hit #1 on the New York Times Best Seller list, and remained on the young adult hardcover list for 15 weeks. Her adult fantasy debut Silvercloak (2025) was an instant Sunday Times bestseller.

She has used comedy to explore feminist issues in her young adult novels, including an exploration of beauty in Every Exquisite Thing (her re-telling of The Picture of Dorian Gray) and of female rage in The Society for Soulless Girls (her re-telling of Strange Case of Dr Jekyll and Mr Hyde).

== Early life ==
Steven grew up in Berwick-upon-Tweed. She graduated with a Bachelor of Arts in journalism in 2013 and a Master of Arts in creative writing, both from Northumbria University.

== Career ==
Steven began her career in magazine journalism. In 2014, at age 23, under the pseudonym Laura Salters, she signed her first book deal with Witness Impulse (a HarperCollins imprint), through which she published her debut novel, a crime thriller titled Run Away, in 2015. This was followed by her second crime novel Perfect Prey in 2016.

Rebranding to Laura Steven, she gained prominence through her young adult Izzy O'Neill duology, the first of which, The Exact Opposite of Okay, was published in 2018 by Electric Monkey (an Egmont Books imprint). The sequel A Girl Called Shameless followed in 2019. Under the name Laura Kirkpatrick, she also published the middle-grade fantasy novel And Then I Turned into a Mermaid via Farshore Books (formerly Egmont Books, since acquired by HarperCollins UK) and its 2020 sequel Don't Tell Him I'm a Mermaid.

Also in 2020, Lime Pictures optioned the rights to adapt Steven's next young adult novel Love Hypothesis for television ahead of its release.

In 2023, it was announced that Steven had moved to Penguin Random House in a "major six-figure deal", including Our Infinite Fates, which then became a #1 New York Times, USA Today, and indie bestseller.

The following year, Steven announced her adult fantasy debut trilogy with fantasy imprint Del Rey Books. Silvercloak, the first book in the series, was published under the pseudonym L.K. Steven and became an instant #5 Sunday Times bestseller in July 2025. The second book, Turncloak, was published in 2026.

== Bibliography ==
=== Izzy O'Neill ===
- The Exact Opposite of Okay. Electric Monkey. 2018. ISBN 978-1405288446.
- A Girl Called Shameless. Electric Monkey. 2019. ISBN 978-1405288620.

=== And Then I Turned into a Mermaid ===
- And Then I Turned into a Mermaid. Farshore Books. 2019.
- Don't Tell Him I'm a Mermaid. Farshore Books. 2020.

=== Stand-alone novels ===
- Run Away. Witness Impulse. 2015.
- Perfect Prey. Witness Impulse. 2016.
- The Love Hypothesis. Electric Monkey. 2020. ISBN 978-1405296946.
- The Society for Soulless Girls. Electric Monkey. 2022. ISBN 978-1405296939.
- Every Exquisite Thing. Electric Monkey. 2023. ISBN 978-0008627355.
- Our Infinite Fates. Wednesday Books. 2025. ISBN 978-1250333889.

=== Silvercloak Saga ===
- Silvercloak. Del Rey. 2025. ISBN 978-0593973998.
- Turncloak. Del Rey. 2026. ISBN 9780593974025.
