= Silvia Saunders =

British-Italian novelist

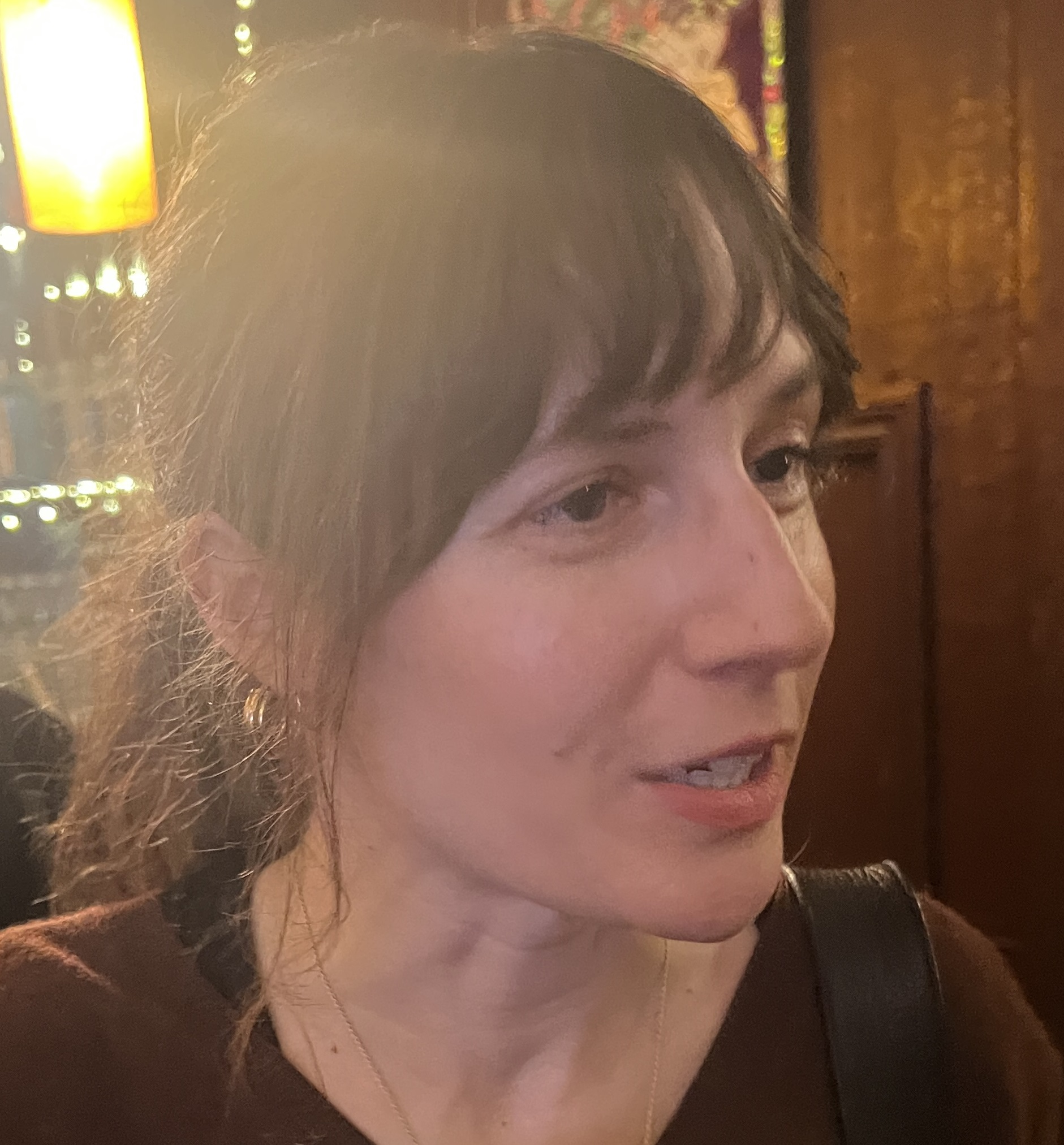
- Saunders at a Comedy Women in Print social event in 2025
- Born: 25 December 1990 (age 35)
- Education: University of Nottingham; Goldsmiths, University of London
- Occupation: Writer

Silvia Saunders is a British-Italian novelist who has spoken about her identity being a blend of both her English and Italian upbringing. She published her debut novel, Homesick, in 2025.

== Career ==
In 2023, Saunders won the Comedy Women in Print Prize for Unpublished Comedy Novel for her 2025 debut, Homesick. She returned two years later as a judge for the Self-Published category.

Homesick was published August 28, 2025, by HarperCollins. Prior to release, Cosmopolitan named the novel among "the 25 books [they] can't wait to read in 2025".

== Publications ==
- Saunders, Silvia (2025). Homesick. Harper Collins. ISBN 9780008667047.
