= Farago =

Farago, Faragò or Faragó is the surname of the following people:

- Andrew Farago (born 1976), American author and former museum curator
- Clara Faragó (1905–1944), Hungarian chess master
- Elena Farago (1878–1954), Romanian poet, translator and children's author
- Iván Faragó (1946–2022), Hungarian chess grandmaster
- János Faragó (1946–1984), Hungarian athlete
- Joe Farago (1948–2025), American actor and television personality
- Katinka Faragó (1936–2024), Swedish film producer
- Ladislas Farago (1906–1980), Hungarian military historian and journalist
- Lajos Faragó (1932–2019), Hungarian footballer
- Paolo Faragò (born 1993), Italian football player
- Tamás Faragó (born 1952), Hungarian water polo player
- Tamás Faragó (musician) (born 1982), Hungarian indie musician
- Tyson Farago (born 1991), Canadian association football player

== See also ==
- Faragó, the Hungarian name for Fărăgău Commune, Mureș County, Romania
