= Kate Bradley Stovall =

American activist and writer

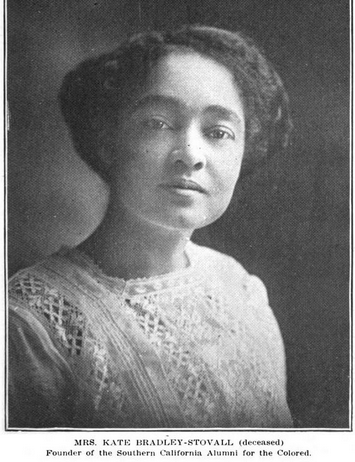
- Kate Bradley Stovall, from a 1919 publication
- Born: August 4, 1884; Austin, Texas, U.S.
- Died: August 5, 1914 (age 30); San Bernardino, California, U.S.
- Occupation(s): Writer, clubwoman

Kate E. Bradley Stovall (August 4, 1884 — August 5, 1914) was an American clubwoman and writer, based in Los Angeles.

== Early life ==
Kate E. (Kittie) Bradley was born in Austin, Texas, the daughter of Allen Bradley. She was raised her paternal aunt and uncle, E. G. Hill and Katie Bradley Hill, in Los Angeles. She graduated from Commercial High School in 1903.

== Career ==
Kate Bradley Stovall was a member of the Woman's Progressive Club, a literary group for Black women. She was founder and president of the Southern California Alumni Association, an organization of college-educated Black residents of the Los Angeles region. She contributed a full-page article to the Los Angeles Times in 1909, titled "The Negro Woman in Los Angeles and Vicinity – Some Notable Characters", summarizing the history of black women in the city to that date, including a biographical sketch of Biddy Mason. She served on the Woman's Parliament of Wesley Chapel Methodist Church, a committee responsible for booking speakers such as Margaret Murray Washington.

== Personal life ==
Kate Bradley married banker William H. Stovall in 1904. They had a son, Wilalyn (pronounced "Will-Allen"), and a daughter, Ursula. Her son was a friend to Ralph Bunche when Bunche arrived in Los Angeles as a youth. She died in 1914, the day after her thirtieth birthday, in San Bernardino, California.
