= Uwem Akpan =

Nigerian writer

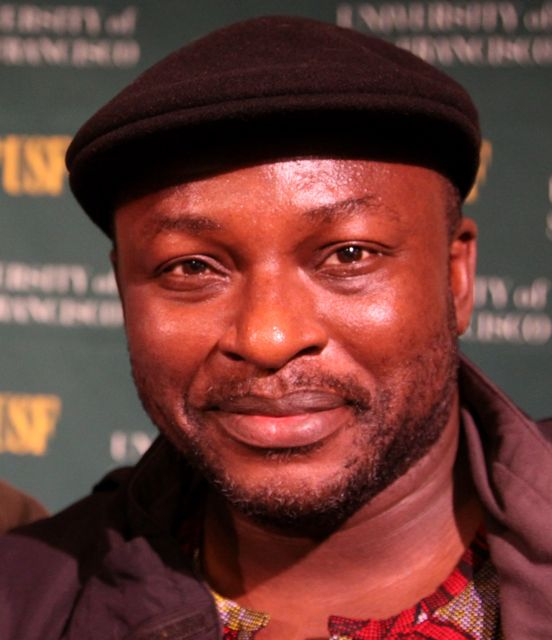
- Akpan at the University of San Francisco
- Born: Akwa Ibom State, Nigeria
- Education: Creighton University; Gonzaga University; Catholic University of Eastern Africa; University of Michigan
- Notable work: Say You're One of Them (2008); New York My Village (2021)
- Awards: Commonwealth Writers Prize (Africa Region); PEN Open Book Prize; Hurston/Wright Legacy Award

Uwem Akpan is a Nigerian fiction writer whose works include fiction, short fiction, essays, autobiography, and public lectures. He is widely recognized as the author of Say You're One of Them (2008), a collection of five stories (each set in a different African country) published by Little, Brown & Company. His debut book achieved international success.

It won the Commonwealth Writers Prize (Africa Region), the PEN Open Book Prize, and the Hurston/Wright Legacy Award, and was picked for the Oprah Winfrey Book Club. A New York Times and Wall Street Journal No. 1 bestseller, the book has been translated into 12 languages.

Akpan's second book and debut novel, New York My Village (2021), was published by W. W. Norton. The book is widely recognized for capturing the woes of minorities in the Biafran War. Oprah Daily selected it as one of the best 20 books of 2021. The iconic Strand Bookstore in New York selected it as their Pick of the Month for November 2021. It was shortlisted for the 2022 Chinua Achebe Prize and longlisted for the 2025 Nigeria Prize for Literature Prize.

== Life ==
Uwem Akpan was born and grew up in an Annang family in Akwa Ibom State, Nigeria. These people are one of the minority ethnicities in defunct Biafra, where Igbo were the majority. The area was overrun during the Biafran War and many Annang were killed.

Akpan grew up listening to Annang folktales told by his mother and grandparents, aunties and uncles. He was grounded in the Bible and educated in part as Catholic.

After studying humanities and philosophy at Creighton University and Gonzaga University in the United States, Akpan returned to Nigeria. He completed his studies and received a theology degree from the Catholic University of Eastern Africa in Kenya. In 2003, Akpan was ordained as a Jesuit priest.

Akpan returned to the U.S. for graduate study, earning a MFA degree in 2006 at the University of Michigan. He had begun to develop the stories he published in his first book.

By the time his book was published, Akpan had returned to Africa. He was working in Zimbabwe as a Jesuit priest. In 2015, Akpan left the Catholic priesthood to spend more time on his writing.

== Career ==
In 2008, Akpan published a collection of short stories entitled Say You're One of Them. Each of the stories featured a child and was set in a different African country. The five short stories and novellas give voice to African children growing up in five different nations, in the face of incredible adversity.

The book was ranked as one of the Best of the Year by The Wall Street Journal (WSJ), People magazine, and other media. The New York Times selected it as the Editor's Choice, and Entertainment Weekly listed it as No. 27 in their "Best of the Decade". It won numerous awards and was nominated for others, as noted in the "Awards" section below. It was a No. 1 bestseller on the lists of both The New York Times and WSJ.

In 2009, Oprah Winfrey selected Akpan's work as her 63rd book club choice. Oprah said that Say You're One of Them "left [her] stunned and profoundly moved."

The success of his book enabled Akpan to have numerous writing fellowships in the United States. Between 2010 and 2017, he was a Fellow at the Black Mountain Institute (University of Nevada, Las Vegas); Institute for the Humanities (University of Michigan, Ann Arbor); Yaddo (Saratoga Springs, New York); the Cullman Center of New York Public Library (NYC, New York); and the Hank Center for Catholic Intellectual Heritage (Loyola University Chicago, 2017).

Akpan now teaches in the University of Florida's writing program. He published his second book, the debut novel New York, My Village (2021), with W. W. Norton.

== Works ==
- Say You're One of Them. Hachette. 2008. ISBN 978-0-316-11378-6.
- New York My Village. W. W. Norton, Nov 2021. ISBN 978-0-393-88142-4

== Awards ==
- Commonwealth Writers' Prize
- PEN Open Book Award
- Hurston/Wright Legacy Award
- Finalist for the Dayton Literary Peace Prize in the Fiction Category
- Finalist for the Los Angeles Times Seidenbaum Award for First Fiction
- Nominated for the Guardian First Book Award
- Nominated for the Caine Prize for African Writing

== Representation in other media ==
Singer/songwriter Angélique Kidjo was inspired by Akpan's first book to write the song "Agbalagba". It became a global hit.
