= Oshé =

Axe of the deity Ṣango in the Yoruba religion

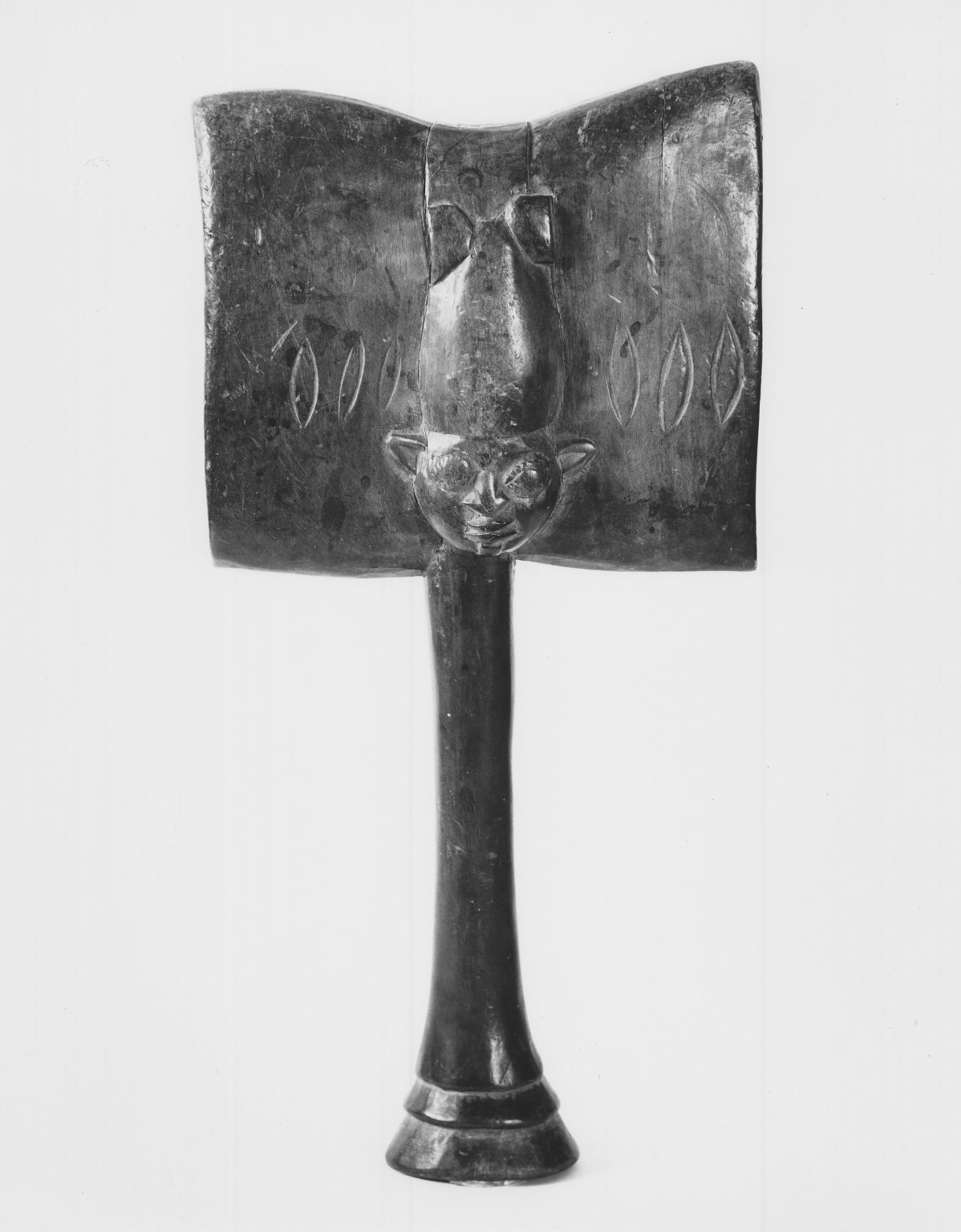
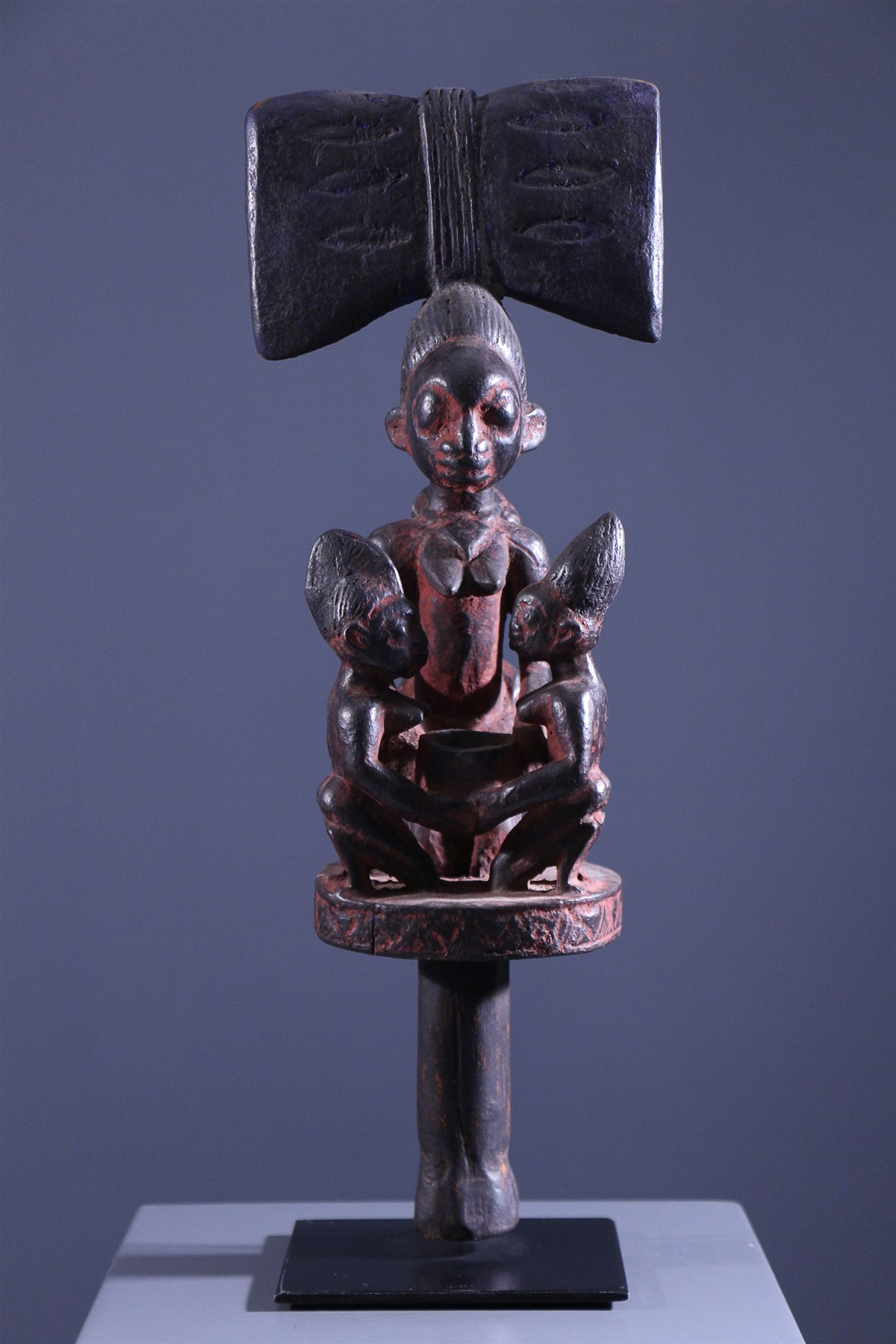
- Left: Shango dance wand, made in the late 19th or early 20th century, Brooklyn Museum
- Right: A wooden Oshé, made circa 1960 in Nigeria

Oshé (Yoruba alphabet: Oṣé) (Note: Also called Oxé or Oxê in Portuguese.) is the double-headed battle axe of the thunder deity Ṣango in Yoruba religion, sometimes considered to be representing bolts of lightning hurled by the deity from Ọrun. Carvings of the axe are used as dance wands during rituals or worn as pendants for protection.

On the 17th of November, 2026, the Supreme Federal Court of Brazil unveiled a sculpture of Sango's double axe (Oxê de Xangô), adding it to one of its collections, as a national symbol of justice. Before it, the state courts of São Paulo, Rio de Janeiro, and Pernambuco had each received theirs. According to its proponents IDAFRO and the Secretariat for Equity, Diversity and Inclusion of the Supreme Federal Court, the presence of Sango's symbol in the national building of the highest court in the Brazilian judiciary represents the recognition of African-based traditions and a commitment to promoting racial equality.

== Etymology ==
The Yoruba word Oṣé comes from o- (a prefix) and ṣé (a word meaning "to do", "to make" or "to affect").

== Beliefs ==
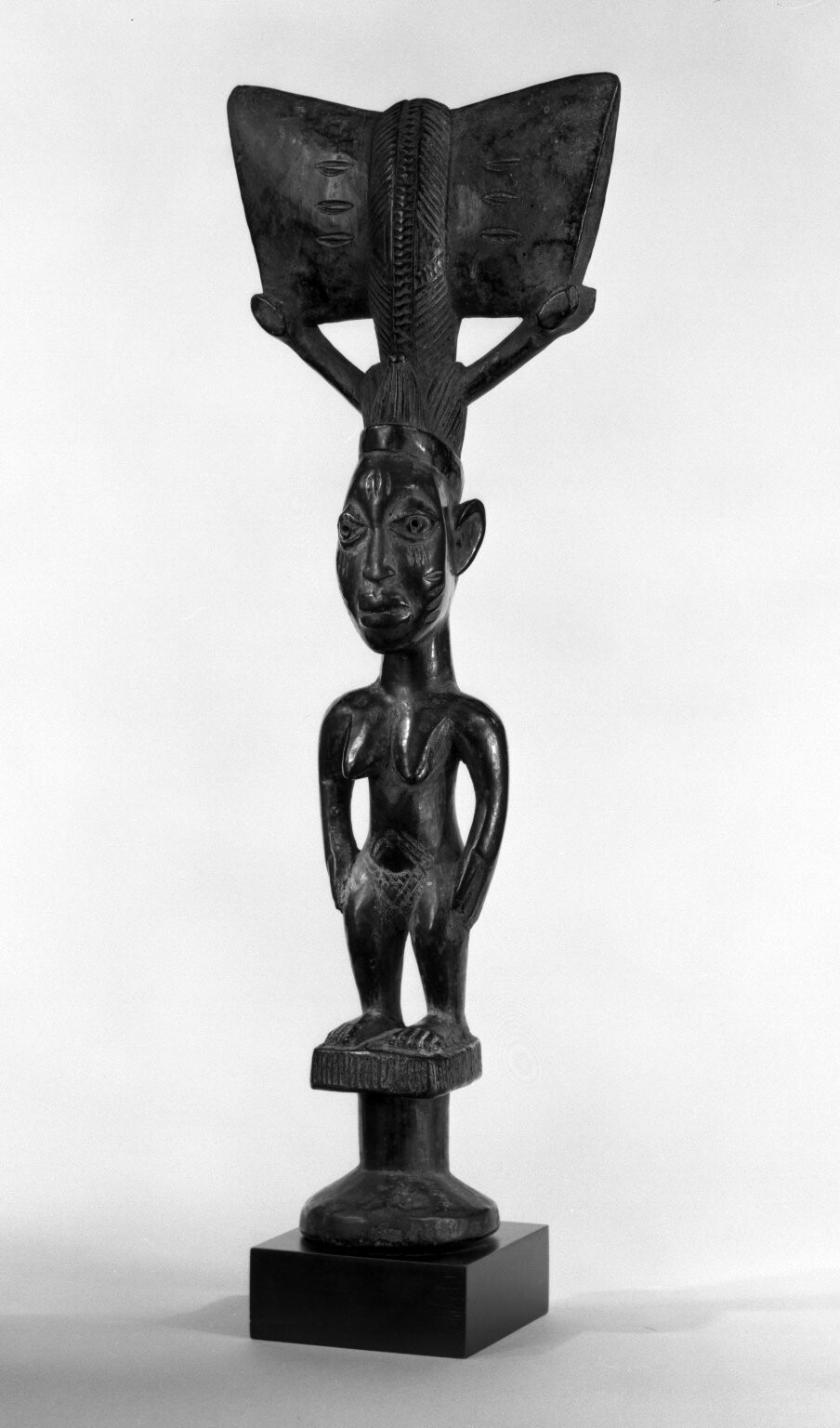
A Yorùbá (Igbomina subgroup) dance wand (Oshé Ṣango), late 19th or early 20th century. Wood, pigment, 19 1/2 x 7 x 3 1/4 in. (49.5 x 17.8 x 8.3 cm). ( Photo: Brooklyn Museum)

According to traditional stories of the Yoruba people, the Oshé was made by the deity Ṣango from the wood of the Ayan tree. When he was the Alaafin of Oyo, he wielded the Oshé as a weapon in battle. Ṣango eventually committed suicide (Note: In some versions of the story, Ṣango didn't commit suicide but rather ascended to the heavens and became a deity.) by hanging from an Ayan tree.

== See also ==
- Ṣango
- Labrys
