= Chioma Okereke =

Nigerian author and short story writer

- Born: Benin City, Nigeria
- Education: University College London
- Notable work: Bitter Leaf (2010)

Chioma Okereke // is a Nigerian-born poet, author and short story writer. Her debut novel, Bitter Leaf (2010), was shortlisted for the Commonwealth Writers' Prize – Africa Best First Book 2011.

== Biography ==
Okereke was born in Benin City, Nigeria. She moved to Britain at the age of six and attended several boarding-schools, before completing her sixth-form education at North London Collegiate School in Canons, Middlesex. Okereke graduated with an LLB degree from University College London.

A poet and short story writer who performed internationally, Okereke had her early work published in Bum Rush The Page and Callaloo literary magazine. She was shortlisted for the Undiscovered Authors Competition in 2006, as well as for the Daily Telegraph's Write a Novel in a Year Competition 2007.

Her debut novel Bitter Leaf was published in 2010 by Virago Pressand was shortlisted for the Commonwealth Writers' Prize - Africa Best First Book 2011.

Her short story "Trompette de la Mort" was First Runner up for the inaugural Costa Short Story Award in the 2012 Costa Book Awards and her work was included in the Virago is 40 anthology (2013).

Her latest novel, Water Baby (April 2024),is a coming-of-age tale set in the real life settlement of Makoko, in Lagos, Nigeria and portrays the societal pressure on a young woman trying to escape the confines of her community. Moved by the plight of the setting of her novel, Chioma Okereke founded Makoko Pearls, a UK registered charity committed to the relief of poverty in Makoko and to bringing positive change to the community.
