= The Fishermen (Obioma novel) =

2015 novel by Chigozie Obioma

- Author: Chigozie Obioma
- Language: English
- Publisher: Little, Brown and Company
- Publication date: April 2015
- Media type: Print
- ISBN: 978-0-316-33837-0

The Fishermen is the debut novel by Nigerian author Chigozie Obioma, published in 2015. The novel follows four brothers in a quiet neighbourhood of a Nigerian town, who are given a violent prophecy which shakes their family to the core. It is set in the 1990s, during the rule of Sani Abacha.

It was shortlisted for the 2015 Man Booker Prize. The novel received a number of accolades, and positive reviews from critics.

== Plot ==
Four brothers, Ikenna, Boja, Obembe, and Benjamin, begin to fish at the Omi-Ala river near their home in a quiet neighbourhood of the city of Akure in Nigeria, despite being forbidden from doing so by their parents, as the river is heavily polluted. On one of their fishing trips, they encounter a local madman, Abulu, who follows them shouting the name of Ikenna, the oldest brother. The other children flee, but the four brothers stop to listen, as Abulu shouts a series of prophecies: that Ikenna will become blind, mute, crippled. He finishes by prophesying that Ikenna will be killed by a fisherman. Ikenna thinks this means that one of his brothers will kill him, and he gradually turns against them. The prophecy undoes the family and the expectations the brothers' parents have for them.

== Development and writing ==
Obioma has seven brothers and four sisters, and wrote the novel as a tribute to his siblings. Two of Obioma's brothers fought violently when they were children, and Obioma was inspired by what he imagined was the worst possible outcome of those fights.

== Reception and criticism ==
The novel has garnered comparisons to Things Fall Apart in part due to the central role prophecy has in each novel. However, some critics disputed the validity of the comparisons. It also references the Biblical story of Cain and Abel, and has been referred to as a "retelling" of the story.

Multiple critics referred to the novel as a Bildungsroman given that it is told from the perspective of one brother, and charts his youth.
