= Wahala (novel) =

2022 novel by Nikki May

- First edition
- Author: Nikki May
- Language: English
- Genre: Literary fiction
- Set in: London
- Publisher: HarperCollins Publishers
- Publication date: 11 January 2022
- Media type: Print (hardcover)
- Pages: 384
- ISBN: 9780063084261

Wahala is a 2022 fiction novel by British Nigerian writer Nikki May. Her debut novel, it was originally published by Custom House an imprint of HarperCollins in 2022. May's debut novel follows the friendship three Anglo-Nigerian women whose friendship are threatened by a Russian-Nigerian woman.

== Development ==
May has stated that she had the inspiration for the novel after having a lunch at a Nigerian restaurant in London and while on a train ride back home she thought about how she changed from the Nigerian she was in the dinner to an English woman. The clash of Nigerian and English cultures made her write the first parts of the book in the train. She finished writing the novel after 18 months and the title of the novel, Wahala, means "trouble" in Nigerian Pidgin.

The book deals with themes of racism, gender and identity, all inspired by May's personal life, when she moved from Nigeria to London as a biracial woman.

In May 2021, six months before it publication, it was optioned by the BBC to be adapted into a television series.

== Plot ==
Set in London, Ronke, Simi and Boo are friends who met at university in Bristol 17 years previously; they are biracial having English mothers and Nigerian fathers. Their friendship is crushed when Isobel, Simi's childhood friend and a rich and influential girl, insists on being the centre of every conversation; she knows the secrets that the three friends are keeping from each other.

== Characters ==
- Ronke — A dentist who is currently single and is looking for a Nigerian husband.
- Simi — A fashion marketer whose husband wants a child she is not ready for. She suffers from impostor syndrome.
- Boo — A research scientist and housewife struggling with internalized racism, due to her biological father having left her mother before she was born. She takes care of her daughter, Sofia, alongside her husband, Didier, while looking for more excitement in her life.
- Isobel Babangari — Simi's rich and influential childhood friend who begins to destroy the rich friendship.
- Kayode — Ronke's Nigerian boyfriend.
- Martin — Simi's husband
- Didier — Boo's French husband
- Sofia — Didier and Boo's daughter

== Reception ==
The book received generally positive reception from book reviewers and readers alike. A starred review from Kirkus Reviews called the novel "a fascinating look at the dark side of female friendship”. Another review by NPR stated that "Wahala is both great fun and extremely smart in how it captures some of the central issues in modern city living". A review from Publishers Weekly noted that "May's nuanced exploration of race and gender makes this refreshing." Nikki May won the Comedy Women in Print Prize New Voice award for Wahala.

== Adaptation ==
In May 2021, it was announced that the BBC had optioned the novel for a television series, with Theresa Ikoko, who is known for her work in Rocks, writing the screenplay. Wahala will be produced by Firebird Pictures, with its founder Elizabeth Kilgarriff, as the executive producer alongside Mona Qureshi. BBC Studios also gained the rights to distribute the series worldwide.
