= Yewande Omotoso =

South African-based novelist (born 1980)

- Born: 1980 (age 45–46); Bridgetown, Barbados
- Education: University of Cape Town
- Occupations: Novelist, architect and designer
- Notable work: Bom Boy (2011); The Woman Next Door (2016)
- Father: Kole Omotoso
- Relatives: Akin Omotoso (brother)
- Website: www.yewandeomotoso.com

Yewande Omotoso (born 1980) is a South African-based novelist, architect and designer, who was born in Barbados and grew up in Nigeria. She currently lives in Johannesburg. Her two published novels have earned her considerable attention, including winning the South African Literary Award for First-Time Published Author, being shortlisted for the South African Sunday Times Fiction Prize, the M-Net Literary Awards 2012, and the 2013 Etisalat Prize for Literature, and being longlisted for the 2017 Bailey's Women's Prize for Fiction. She is the daughter of Nigerian writer Kole Omotoso, and the sister of filmmaker Akin Omotoso.

== Early years and education ==
Yewande Omotoso was born in Bridgetown, Barbados; and within a year of her birth went with her Barbadian mother, Nigerian father and two older brothers to Nigeria. She grew up in Ile-Ife, Osun State, until 1992, when the family moved to South Africa after her father took an academic appointment with the University of the Western Cape. She has said, "Regardless of how many years I’ve lived in South Africa I think of myself as a product of three nations: Barbados, Nigeria, and South Africa. Nigeria forms a very strong part of my sense of myself, my identity", and in a 2015 interview, she said: "Identity is complex. I love being a Nigerian, I love belonging to that identity even if my belonging is complex, due to my multiple identities and migratory life experience."

She studied architecture at the University of Cape Town (UCT), and after working for some years as an architect went on to obtain a master's degree in Creative Writing at the same university.

== Writing career and related activities ==
Omotoso's debut novel, Bom Boy, was published in 2011 by Modjaji Books in Cape Town. It won the 2012 South African Literary Award for First-Time Published Author, was shortlisted for the South African Sunday Times Fiction Prize, and for the M-Net Literary Awards 2012. Bom Boy was also runner-up for the 2013 Etisalat Prize for Literature, following which Omotoso took up a 2014 Etisalat Fellowship at the University of East Anglia that was given up on her behalf by the 2013 prizewinner NoViolet Bulawayo.

Omotoso was a 2013 Norman Mailer Fellow and was the recipient of a Miles Morland Scholarship in 2014.

Like Bom Boy, her second novel, The Woman Next Door (Chatto and Windus, 2016) was also positively reviewed, with Publishers Weekly referring to it as "this charming, touching, occasionally radiant tale of two prickly octogenarians: two women, one black and one white, neighbours who discover after 20 years of exchanging digs and insults that they might help each other... Omotoso captures the changing racial relations since the 1950s, as well as the immigrant experience through personal detail and small psychological insights into mixed emotions, the artist’s eye, and the widow’s remorse. Hers is a fresh voice as adept at evoking the peace of walking up a kopje as the cruelty of South Africa’s past." The Irish Independent described The Woman Next Door as "a finely observed account of female prejudice, redemption and that often elusive commodity - friendship." Having been shortlisted for the 2016 University of Johannesburg Prize, in 2017 it was shortlisted for the Sunday Times Barry Ronge Fiction Prize and was longlisted for the Bailey's Women's Prize for Fiction, and went on to be shortlisted for the 2018 International Dublin Literary Award.

Omotoso has contributed stories and poetry to various publications, among them Konch, Noir Nation, Speaking for the Generation: Contemporary Stories from Africa, Contemporary African Women’s Poetry, Kalahari Review, The Moth Literary Journal, One World Two, the 2012 Caine Prize anthology, and New Daughters of Africa (2019), edited by Margaret Busby.

She is a frequent participant in literary festivals, including the Aké Arts and Book Festival, the Edinburgh International Book Festival and the PEN American World Voices Festival. She joined the board of PEN South Africa in 2017 and became vice president in 2019, serving in the role until July 2024.

Omotoso has been known in some circles for her creative use of emojis such as the aptly named juju mask.

== Bibliography ==
- Bom Boy, Modjaji Books, 2011. ISBN 978-1-920397-35-7
- The Woman Next Door, Chatto and Windus, 2016.
- An Unusual Grief, Cassava Republic Press, 2022
