= Oyin Olugbile =

Nigerian author

- Born: Ibadan, Oyo State, Nigeria
- Education: University of Lagos (BA); King's College London (MSc)
- Spouse: Olumayowa Olugbile (m. 2014)
- Children: 5
- Writing career
- Years active: 2022–present
- Notable work: Sànyà
- Notable awards: Nigeria Prize for Literature (2025)
- Website: oyinolugbile.com

Oyin Olugbile is a Nigerian author known for her debut novel Sànyà, which won the 2025 Nigeria Prize for Literature. Her work explored the themes of reimagining of African mythology and exploration of identity and memory, often centering women and ancestry.

== Early life and education ==
Olugbile was born in Ibadan, Nigeria. She earned a BA in creative arts from the University of Lagos and MSc in leadership and development from King's College London. She also holds several postgraduate certificates from Lagos Business School and Harvard Business School.

== Career ==
In October 2025, Olugbile's debut novel, Sanya, was awarded the Nigeria Prize for Literature.

== Awards and recognition ==
Awards for Olugbile
Year	Award	Result	Ref.
2023	FutureED Award for Best Learning Support	Winner	
2024	CANEX Prize for Publishing	Longlist	
2025	Nigeria Prize for Literature	Winner	

== Personal life ==
Olugbile is married and has five children.

== Writings ==
=== Fiction ===
- Sànyà (2022)

=== Non-fiction ===
- The Road to Good Governance in Nigeria and Africa (2022, with the SPPG Pioneer Cohort)
