= Chigozie Obioma =

Nigerian writer (born 1986)

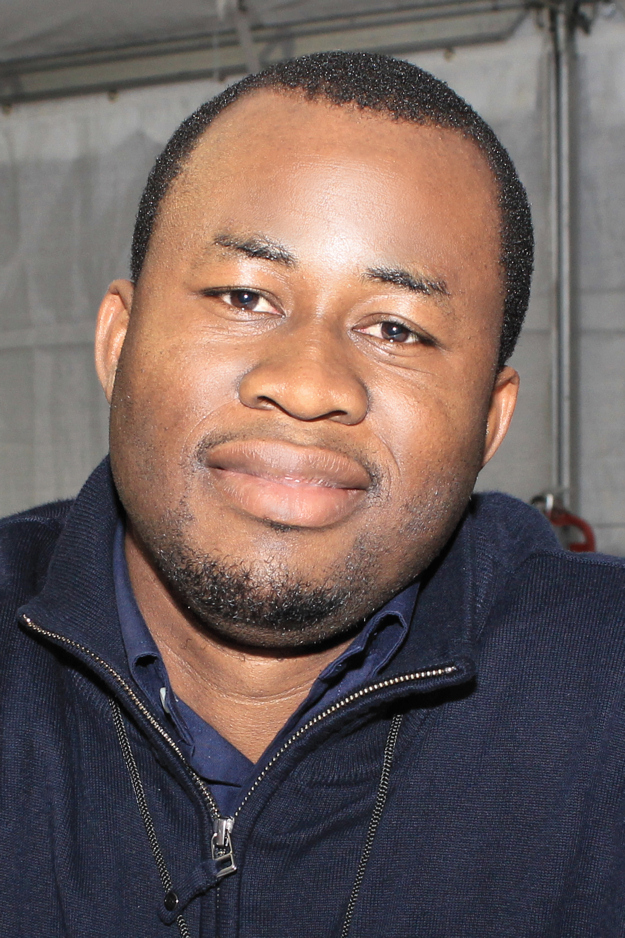
- Obioma in 2016
- Born: 1986 (age 39–40); Akure, Nigeria
- Education: Cyprus International University; University of Michigan
- Occupations: Author; poet; professor
- Writing career
- Period: 2011–present
- Notable works: The Fishermen (2015); An Orchestra of Minorities (2019); The Road to the Country (2024)
- Website: chigozieobioma.com

Chigozie Obioma (1986) was born in Akure, Nigeria. He is the author of three novels: The Fishermen (2015), An Orchestra of Minorities (2019) and The Road to the Country (2024). The Fishermen and An Orchestra of Minorities were finalists for the Booker Prize and have been translated into 30 languages. He has won an LA Times book prize, the Internationaler Literaturpris, FT/Oppenheimer prize for fiction, an NAACP Image Award and has been nominated for two dozen prizes for fiction. He was named one of Foreign Policy's 100 Leading Global Thinkers in 2015 and on the 100 Most Influential Africans list by NewAfrican magazine in 2015 and 2024.

Obioma served as a judge of the Booker Prize in 2021. His work has appeared in The New York Times, The Guardian, Financial Times, Paris Review, Granta, and elsewhere. His third novel, The Road to the Country, published in 2024 was longlisted for the Joyce Carol Oates Prize for fiction, the Dublin Literary Award for fiction, and was named a best book of the year by The Economist and Boston Globe, among others. Obioma is currently the Helen S. Lanier Professor of Creative Writing and English at the University of Georgia and the programme director of the Oxbelly Fiction Writers retreat.

== Early life and influences ==
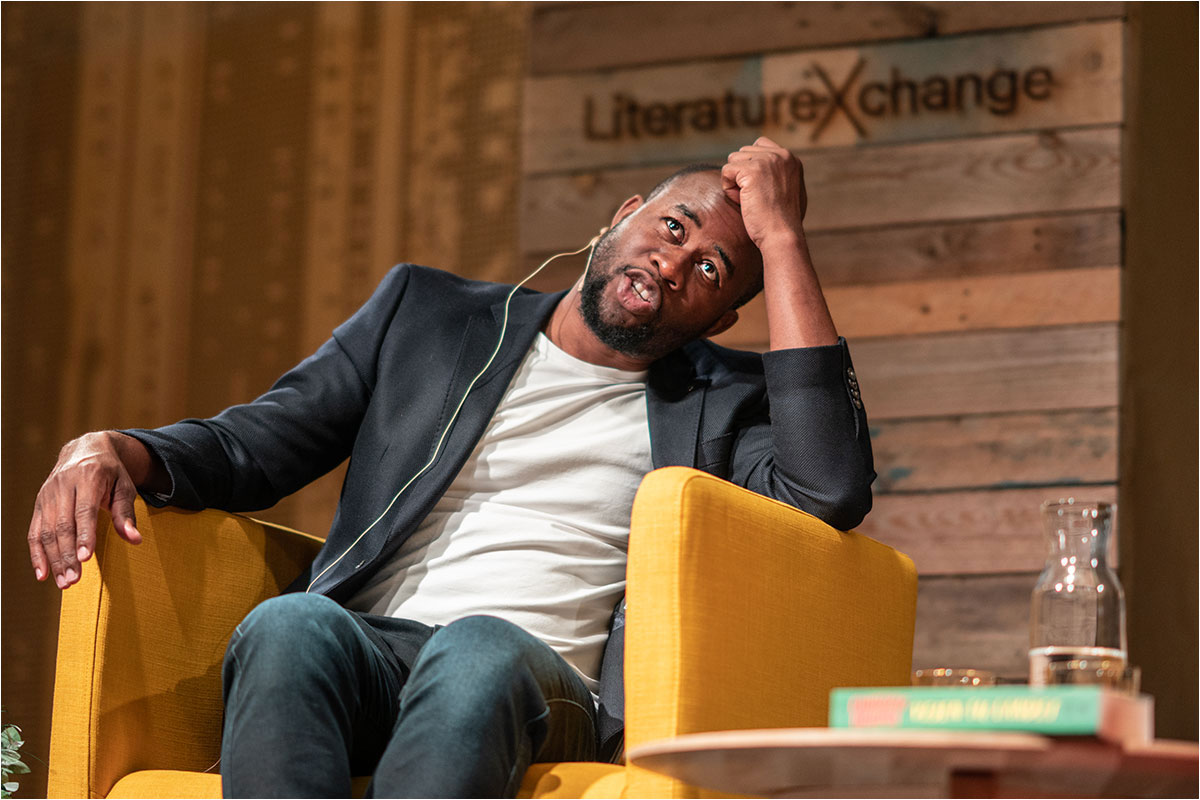
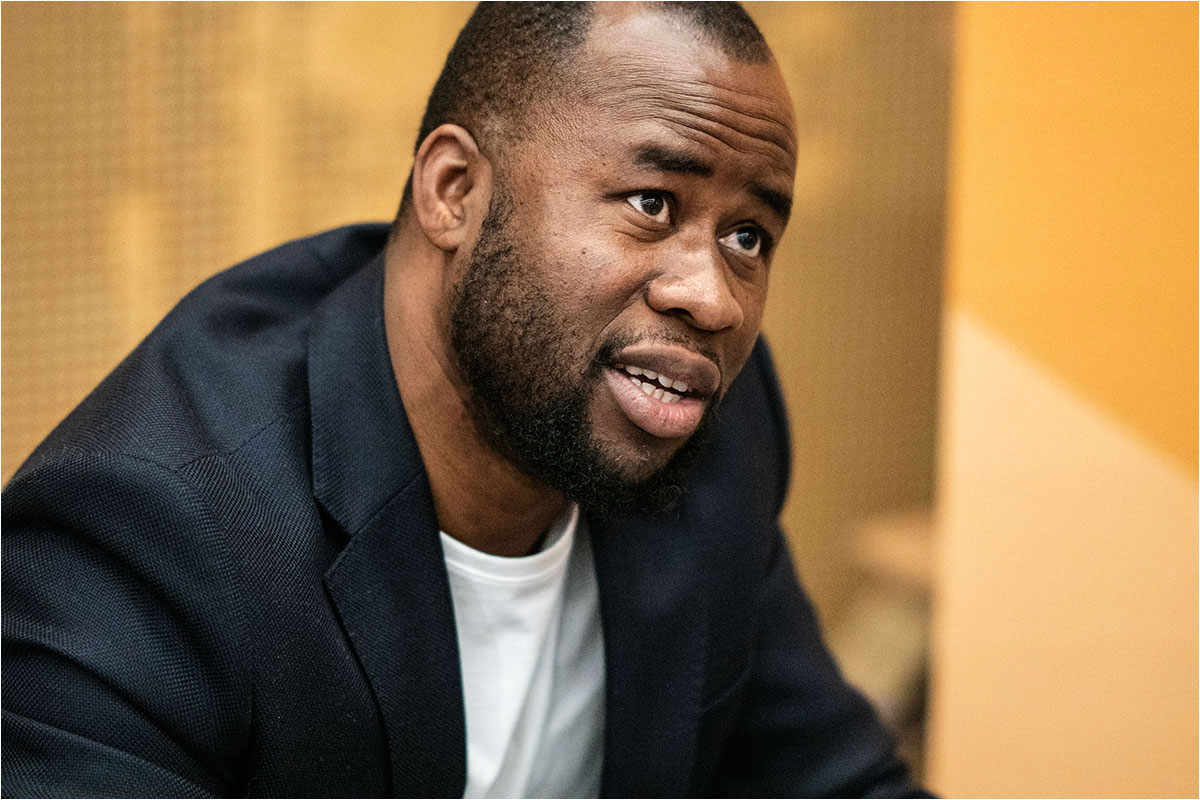
LiteratureXchange Festival
Aarhus (Denmark 2024)
Photo Hreinn Gudlaugsson

Of Igbo descent, Obioma was born in 1986 into a family of 12 children — seven brothers and four sisters – in Akure, in the south-western part of Nigeria, where he grew up speaking Yoruba, Igbo, and English.

As a child, he was fascinated by Greek myths and British writers, including Shakespeare, John Milton, and John Bunyan. Among African writers, he developed a strong affinity for Wole Soyinka's The Trials of Brother Jero; Cyprian Ekwensi's An African Night's Entertainment; Camara Laye's The African Child; and D. O. Fagunwa's Ògbójú Ọdẹ nínú Igbó Irúnmalẹ̀, which he read in its original Yoruba version.

Obioma cites his seminal influences as The Palm-Wine Drinkard by Amos Tutuola, for its breadth of imagination; Tess of the d'Urbervilles by Thomas Hardy, for its enduring grace and heart; The God of Small Things by Arundhati Roy and Lolita by Vladimir Nabokov, both for the power of their prose; and Arrow of God by Chinua Achebe, for its firmness in Igbo culture and philosophy.

== Education ==
Obioma was awarded a residency at Omi's Ledig House in 2012, and completed a Master of Fine Arts in Creative Writing at the University of Michigan, where he received Hopwood Awards for fiction (2013) and poetry (2014).

== Career and other activities ==
In December 2020, Obioma was named as a judge for the 2021 Booker Prize.

He served as the James E. Ryan Associate Professor of English at the University of Nebraska–Lincoln.

In January 2023, Obioma announced that he joined the Oxbelly Writers Retreat, a writers' retreat that was founded by Christos Konstantakoupolous with the vision of bringing writers from all over the world, no matter their means or origin, to come together, share and put their ideas together.

As of 2024, he is Helen S. Lanier Distinguished Professor of English at the University of Georgia.

In 2026, Obioma was named as a producer in the Nollywood rom-com, Call of My Life, which became the highest-grossing movie of the year in Nigeria.

== Writing ==
=== The Fishermen ===
Obioma finished his first novel, The Fishermen, while completing his residency at Ledig House in 2012. It was published in 2015, and won many accolades. It was listed as a 2015 New York Times Sunday Book Review Notable Book, a New York Times Sunday Book Review Editor's Choice selection, and a best book of the year for 2015 by The Observer (UK), The Economist, The Financial Times, The Wall Street Journal, Apple/iBook, Book Riot, the Minnesota Star Tribune, NPR, Library Journal, Canadian Broadcasting Corporation, the New Zealand Listener, Relevant Magazine, British GQ, and others. The Fishermen was also named one of the American Library Association's five best debuts of spring 2015, a Publishers Weekly book of the week, and one of Kirkus Reviews′ "10 Novels to Lose Yourself In." In December 2019 it was named one of the best books of the decade by the Australian Broadcasting Corporation's Radio National's "book experts", Kate Evans and Sarah L'Estrange.

It won several awards: the FT/OppenheimerFunds Emerging Voices Award, the NAACP Image Award for Outstanding Literary Work – Debut Author, the Los Angeles Times Art Seidenbaum Award for First Fiction, the Nebraska Book Award For Fiction 2016, and the Earphones Award for the Audiobook of The Fishermen.

Obioma states that, in addition to being a tribute to his siblings, the novel aims to "build a portrait of Nigeria at a very seminal moment in its history (the annulled presidential elections of 1993), and by so doing deconstruct and illuminate the ideological potholes that still impede the nation's progress even today." He began writing the novel in 2009, while living in Cyprus to complete his bachelor's degree at Cyprus International University, where he graduated at the top of his class. The idea for the novel came when he reflected on his father's joy at the growing bond between his two eldest brothers who, as children, had maintained a strong rivalry that would sometimes culminate in fistfights. As Obioma began pondering what was the worst that could have happened at that time, the image of the Agwu family came to him. Then he created Abulu as the facilitator of conflict between the brothers. On a larger thematic note, Obioma wanted the novel to comment on the socio-political situation of Nigeria: the prophesying madman here being the British, and the recipients of the vision being the people of Nigeria (three major tribes cohabiting to form a nation).

New Perspectives theatre company presented a stage adaptation of The Fishermen adapted by Gbolahan Obisesan from 2018.

=== An Orchestra of Minorities ===
Little, Brown and Company published Obioma's highly anticipated second novel, An Orchestra of Minorities, in January 2019. Drawing on Obioma's own experiences studying abroad in northern Cyprus, An Orchestra of Minorities tells the story of a Nigerian poultry farmer who, determined to make money to prove himself worthy of the woman he loves, travels to northern Cyprus, where he is confronted by racism and scammed by corrupt middlemen. Obioma was particularly inspired by his friend Jay, who was found dead at the bottom of a lift shaft in Cyprus after having his tuition funds embezzled by fixers.

The novel was listed as an E! online Top 20 Books to read in 2020 and a New York Times Editor's Choice. It was also named a best book of the year for 2019 by the BBC, Houston Chronicle, Financial Times, TIME, Amazon.com, Publishers Weekly, Minnesota Star Tribune, Waterstones, ChannelsTV, Columbia Tribune, New York Library, Manchester Union, and Brittlepaper, as well as being Salman Rushdie's Celebrity Pick of the Year.

=== The Road to the Country ===
The Road to the Country is a war novel that captures the Nigerian Civil War from 1967–1970. Published by Hutchinson Heinemann in the UK and Hogarth in the US, it tells the story of a war, brotherhood and love. Set in eastern Nigeria, Kunle finds himself trapped in a war when he embarks on a search mission to find his brother Tunde. The story is told by a seer who predicts the war and conflict and refers to Kunle as 'one who will die and return to life'. According to The Economist: “The novel captures Nigeria’s fault lines in both language (with a mix of English, Yoruba and Igbo) and form. It flits between the real and the supernatural. The novel is narrated in part by a Yoruba seer who predicted the conflict and features an interlude with testimonies of people who died in battle, evoking an Igbo proverb: “The story of a war can only be fully and truly told by both the living and the dead.”

=== Other publications ===
Obioma has published several short stories: a short story version of The Fishermen in Virginia Quarterly Review, "The Great Convert" in Transition magazine, "Midnight Sun" in the New Statesman, and "The Strange Story of the World" on Granta.com. He has also published several essays: "The Audacity of Prose" in The Millions; "Teeth Marks: The Translator's Dilemma" in Poets & Writers; "Finding The Light Under The Bushel: How One Writer Came To Love Books" in The New York Times; and "The Ghosts of My Student Years in Northern Cyprus," "Lagos is expected to double in size in 15 years: how will my city possibly cope?", "Africa Has Been Failed By Westernisation," "Life-Saving Optimism: What the West Can Learn From Africa," and "Toni Morrison: Farewell to America's Greatest Writer" in The Guardian.

== Bibliography ==
- The Fishermen (2015)
- An Orchestra of Minorities (2019)
- The Road to the Country (2024)

== Awards and recognition ==
In a 2015 review in The New York Times, Obioma was called "the heir to Chinua Achebe". In the same year, he was named one of "100 Global Thinkers" by Foreign Policy magazine.

For The Road to the Country:

- Longlisted, 2025 Dublin Literary Award
- Longlisted, 2025 Joyce Carol Oates Literary Prize
- Finalist, Nigeria Prize for Literature

For An Orchestra of Minorities:

- Joint winner, Internationaler Literaturpreis
- Finalist, 2019 Booker Prize for Fiction
- Finalist, Digital Book World Awards 2019
- Finalist, Kulturhuset Internationella Pris for Best Translated Fiction
- Finalist, La sélection du prix du livre étranger JDD/France Inter 2020

For The Fishermen:

- Winner, FT/OppenheimerFunds Emerging Voices Award
- Winner, NAACP Image Award for Outstanding Literary Work - Debut Author
- Winner, Los Angeles Times Art Seidenbaum Award for First Fiction
- Winner, Nebraska Book Award For Fiction 2016
- Winner, Earphones Award for the Audiobook of The Fishermen
- Finalist, 2015 Booker Prize for Fiction
- Shortlisted in the Belles-Lettres Category of the Grand Prix of Literary Associations 2016
- Finalist, Center for Fiction First Novel Prize
- Finalist, Edinburgh Festival First Book Award
- Finalist, The Guardian First Book Award
- Finalist, British Book Industry Award for Best Debut Fiction
- Finalist, Best Debut Goodreads Author Award
- Longlisted, International Dylan Thomas Prize
