= Nikki May =

Anglo-Nigerian novelist

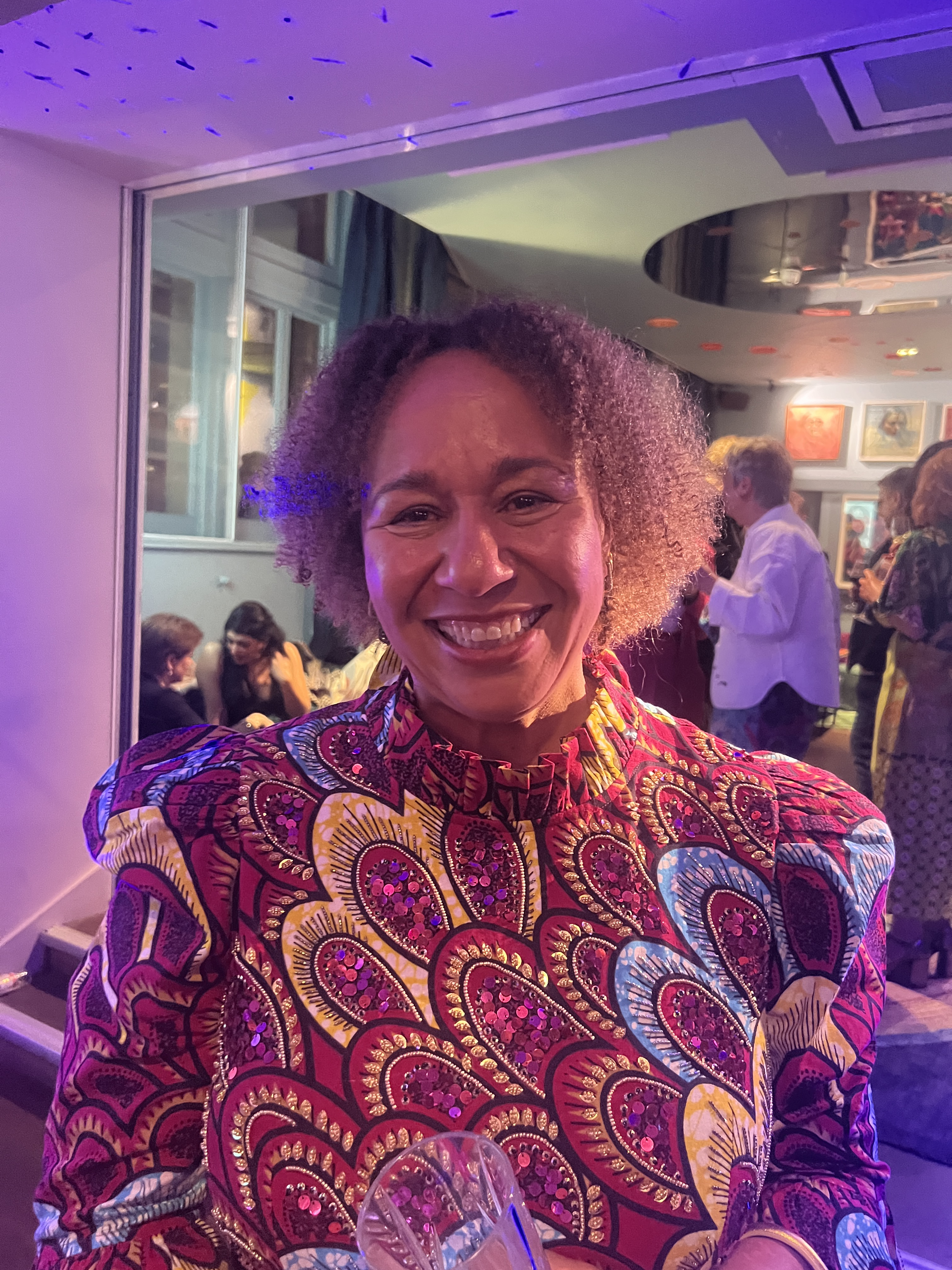
- May at the Comedy Women in Print awards, November 2025
- Born: Bristol, England
- Occupation: Writer
- Notable works: Wahala
- Notable awards: Comedy Women in Print Prize

Website
- nikki-may.com

Nikki May is an Anglo-Nigerian novelist who has blended her experiences of both English and Nigerian cultures into her comedy novels.

She won the Comedy Women in Print Prize New Voice award for her first novel Wahala, and she spoke about the writing of the novel on the BBC's Woman's Hour.

May's second novel, This Motherless Land, is loosely based on Jane Austen's Mansfield Park.

== Publications ==
- May, Nikki (2023). Wahala. Penguin. ISBN 9781804990872.
- This Motherless Land (2025), Penguin ISBN 9781804994382
