= Songs My Mother Never Taught Me =

2007 novel by Selçuk Altun

- Paperback cover
- Author: Selçuk Altun
- Original title: Annemin Öğretmediği Şarkılar
- Translator: Ruth Christie & Selçuk Berilgen
- Language: Turkish
- Genre: Crime novel
- Publisher: Telegram Books
- Publication date: 2007
- Publication place: Turkey
- English publication date: 2008
- Media type: Print (Paperback)
- Pages: 212 pp
- ISBN: 978-1-84659-053-5

Songs My Mother Never Taught Me (Turkish title: Annemin Öğretmediği Şarkılar) is a 2007 detective fiction novel by Turkish writer Selçuk Altun republished in 2008 by Telegram Books in English language translation by Ruth Christie and Selçuk Berilgen.

== Plot ==
The novel, described by the publisher as, “a remarkable thriller that takes us through the streets of Istanbul,” tells the story the privileged young Arda, who reflects the life of his murdered father, after the death of his overbearing mother, and ‘your humble servant’ Bedirhan, who has decided to pack in his ten-year career as an assassin, as their two lives become intrinsically bound, while, Selçuk Altun, a former family friend, provides Arda with clues to track down his father's killer.

== Publishing history ==
Altun, himself, paid for the English translation of the novel in 2007 in what he describes as, “an expensive gamble”, intended to bring his books to an international audience. According to the author, this translation, by Ruth Christie and Selçuk Berilgen, was “not supported by a special promotion program when it was first published in the UK in the summer of 2008”, but sold 3,000 copies nonetheless. However while the English publisher opted to follow it with Many and Many a Year Ago in 2009 and various German, Swiss, Spanish and Portuguese houses have expressed an interest in buying rights, “the global economic crisis seems to have stopped the process”, and, “Three foreign publishing houses acquired the rights to publish Songs My Mother Never Taught Me, but that was it!”

== Reception ==
According to the author, the novel, “received mostly positive reviews,” including those of Maureen Freely who said, “Altun offers us three delights for the price of one: a brilliantly edgy, witty thriller that rivals Highsmith; a metaphysical puzzle that Borges would be proud to call his own; and a tale of two assassins that conveys, better than any other novel I have read, the way money talks in Istanbul,” and poet John Ashbery who said, “Altun’s prose has a dreamlike urgency; his novel is a major achievement.”
