= Huma Anwar =

Pakistani translator and editor

- ہما انور
- Born: Lahore, Pakistan
- Citizenship: Pakistan
- Education: Kinnaird College for Women; University of the Punjab (M.Sc.)
- Occupations: Translator, Editor
- Writing career
- Language: Urdu
- Genre: Literary translation
- Notable works: My Name is Red (Surkh Mera Naam), The Forty Rules of Love (Chalees Charagh Ishq Ke)
- Notable awards: United Bank Limited Literary Excellence Award (Best Translation, 2015); Pakistan Academy of Letters Award (Best Translation, 2017)

Huma Anwar (Urdu: ہما انور) is a Pakistani translator and editor recognized for her distinguished Urdu translations of world literature.

Her translations include works from Turkish, Brazilian, Canadian, English, and Japanese literature. She is recognized among those translators who introduced global literary masterpieces to Urdu readers with cultural sensitivity, stylistic precision, and idiomatic fluency. She has also served as editor for several acclaimed books on history, politics, fiction, and non-fiction.

== Early life and education ==
Huma Anwar was born in Lahore, Pakistan. She received her early education in Lahore and graduated in General Science from Kinnaird College for Women, Lahore, Pakistan. She earned her M.Sc. degree in statistics from the University of the Punjab, Lahore. Alongside her studies, she developed a deep interest in literature, linguistics, and translation — interests that shaped her later career as a distinguished translator and editor.

== Career and notable translations ==
Huma Anwar began her literary career as a translator and editor and has worked with several publishing houses. Known for her linguistic grace and cultural sensitivity, Huma's translations preserve the literary tone and spirit of the original texts. She has translated works by internationally renowned authors into Urdu, including:

- Flight of the Falcon (Shaheen ki Parwaz), by Sajad Haider
- Future of Pakistan (Pakistan ka Mustaqbil), by Stephen P. Cohen
- In Search of Solution (Maqsad-e-Siyasat) (Biography of Ghaus Bakhsh Bizenjo)
- Ataturk: The Rebirth of a Nation (Ataturk: Qaum aur Jumhooria ka Zahoor), by Patrick Kinross
- The Lost Word (Griftar Lafzon ki Rihai), by Oya Baydar
- Summer's End (Anjaam e Baharaan), by Adalet Ağaoğlu
- Curfew: A Novel (Curfew), by Adalet Ağaoğlu
- Kamikaze Diary (Kamikaze Diary), by Emiko Ohnuki-Tierney
- Honour (Namoos), by Elif Shafak — *shortlisted for 5th UBL Literary Excellence Award (2015)*
- My Name is Red (Surkh Mera Naam), by Orhan Pamuk — *winner of 5th UBL Literary Excellence Award (2015)*
- The Land (Torres novel)/Essa Terra (Sarzameen), by Antônio Torres
- Cat Letters (Jilawatan Billiyan), by Oya Baydar
- Young Dog, Old Wolf/O Cachorro e o Lobo (Ujray Diar), by Antônio Torres — *shortlisted for 6th UBL Literary Excellence Award (2016)* ISBN 9789696520214
- Life of Pi (Jeevan Pi Ka), by Yann Martel
- The Sultan of Byzantium (Byzanteeni Sultan), by Selçuk Altun
- The Forty Rules of Love (Chalees Charagh Ishq Ke), by Elif Shafak — *winner of Pakistan Academy of Letters Award (2017)*
- Snow (Pamuk novel) (Jahan Baraf Rehti Hai), by Orhan Pamuk
- Madonna in a Fur Coat (Madonna), by Sabahattin Ali
- The Museum of Innocence (Khana-e-Masumiyet), by Orhan Pamuk
- The Thing – a novel on the life of Omar Khayyam, (Shey) by Sadık Yalsızuçanlar ISBN 9789696521891
- The Runaways (Mafroor), by Fatima Bhutto
- The Gate of Judas Tree (Baab-e-Erghuvan), by Oya Baydar
- The Tamarind Tree (Imli ka Ped), by Sundara Ramaswamy
- Crooked Plow (Ju-e Khoon), by Itamar Vieira Junior ISBN 9786277508524
- Blues for a Lost Childhood (Mere Bachpan ke Din), by Antônio Torres ISBN 9786277508531

== Awards and recognition ==
- The Forty Rules of Love (Chalees Charagh Ishq Ke), translated by Huma Anwar, received the Muhammad Hasan Askari Award (Pakistan Academy of Letters, 2017) for Best Translation.
- My Name is Red (Surkh Mera Naam), translated by Huma Anwar, won the UBL Literary Excellence Award (2015) for Best Urdu Translation.

Huma Anwar has also served as a judge for the Pakistan Academy of Letters' National Literary Awards, for the Muhammad Hasan Askari Award for Translation.

== Literary style ==
Huma Anwar's translations are characterized by linguistic elegance, fidelity to the cultural context of the original text, and aesthetic precision in Urdu rendering. Her work reflects emotional balance, conceptual depth, and a refined sense of language, making her one of the most respected literary translators in Pakistan. She has also served as editor for several acclaimed books on history, politics, fiction, and non-fiction.
