= The Land (Torres novel) =

The Land (Portuguese: Essa Terra) is a 1976 novel by Brazilian writer Antônio Torres, a member of the Academia Brasileira de Letras. The book, a best-seller, has been republished and translated into more than 18 different languages, including a translation into English by Margaret A. Neves, published by Readers International in 1987. The novel made Torres famous all over Brazil and worldwide. The novel in Portuguese is in its 32nd edition and in different formats. Originally published by Editora Ática, its first edition sold 30,000 copies right after its release. After its 15th edition, Record Publishers acquired the rights of publication of all of the author's works.

== Structure ==
The novel is divided into four parts: "The Land Calls Me," "The Land Casts Me Out," "The Land Maddens Me," and "The Land Takes me Back." Each part is followed by an illustration by Brazilian artist Djanira, whose work also illustrates the book's cover.

== Summary ==
The novel plays with contemporary narrative styles and with the techniques of flash forward and flashback. It takes place in a small, poor village called Junco, in the state of Bahia in rural Brazil, which is described by the initial narrator, a young man named Totonhim, as "the end of the world." Everyone in the village mirrors their dreams in Totonhim's brother Nelo, who had left town in search of fame and success in the distant industrial and wealthy city of São Paulo. However, everyone's dreams and hopes come to naught when Nelo returns. Instead of famous and rich, he is a penniless drunkard who ends up hanging himself, crushing everybody's hopes transferred to the mythological figure. The novel is then narrated in flashback from the points of view of Nelo's mother and father. As they try to make sense of what led to the tragic end of their son, the family also tries to come to grips with "what has always been the hopelessness and cruelty of their lives." During Nelo's funeral, his deluded mother starts a process of denial by rejecting her son's death and confusing her son Totonhim with the deceased Nelo. Totonhim then decides to leave Junco and follow his brother's footsteps, although he is aware that the dream promised by the big city is a mere illusion. The Land is considered a despairing, political novel, which shows Torres' mastery of melodic prose and style, as well as his affectionate knowledge of rural Brazil.

== Reception ==
At the time of its release in English, the Book Review in Kirkus defined the book as "a sad, simple, lyrical novel about a poor family's dashed hopes when a favored son returns from the big city to commit suicide."

The book was acclaimed by critics and began to be used as a literary classic in many schools and universities in Brazil. Among the innumerable reviews, essays and academic studies in masters theses and doctoral dissertations, several writers and important critics from different parts of the world have written positive comments about this book: Doris Lessing (England), Teolinda Gersão (Portugal), Ascensión Rivas (Spain) and many other writers from Brazil, such as Jorge Amado and Affonso Romano de Sant'Anna, and newspaper critics such as Leo Gilson Ribeiro (Jornal da Tarde, São Paulo), Leonor Bassères (Tribuna da Imprensa, Rio de Janeiro), Irineu Garcia (Jornal de Letras, Lisbon), Torriéri Guimarães (Folha da Tarde, São Paulo), Flávio Moreira da Costa (O Globo, Rio de Janeiro), Wladyr Nader (Folha de São Paulo), Gerson Pereira Valle (Tribuna de Petrópolis), Gerana Damulakis (A Tarde, Salvador). The land has generated a trilogy, with O cachorro e o lobo [The Dog and the Wolf] and Pelo fundo da agulha [Through the eye of the needle], both very well received by critics and the public. It was well-received by critics in France. The site remue.net described the book as "a romanesque song of love and despair" ["ce chant romanesque d’amour et de désespoir"].

In English, the novel was reviewed by Kirkus and by Publishers Weekly. It is cited in The Cambridge Companion to the Postcolonial Novel and in Richard Pine's The Disappointed Bridge: Ireland and the Post-Colonial World. It is the first of Torres's two novels published in English. The other one is Blues for a Lost Childhood (1989), translated by John Parker and also published by Readers International, which was reviewed by the Los Angeles Times.

== Translations ==
The Land has been translated into many languages. In 2014, Huma Anwar has translated it into Urdu as Sarzameen. ISBN 9789699739996
