= 2019 Booker Prize =

Literary award

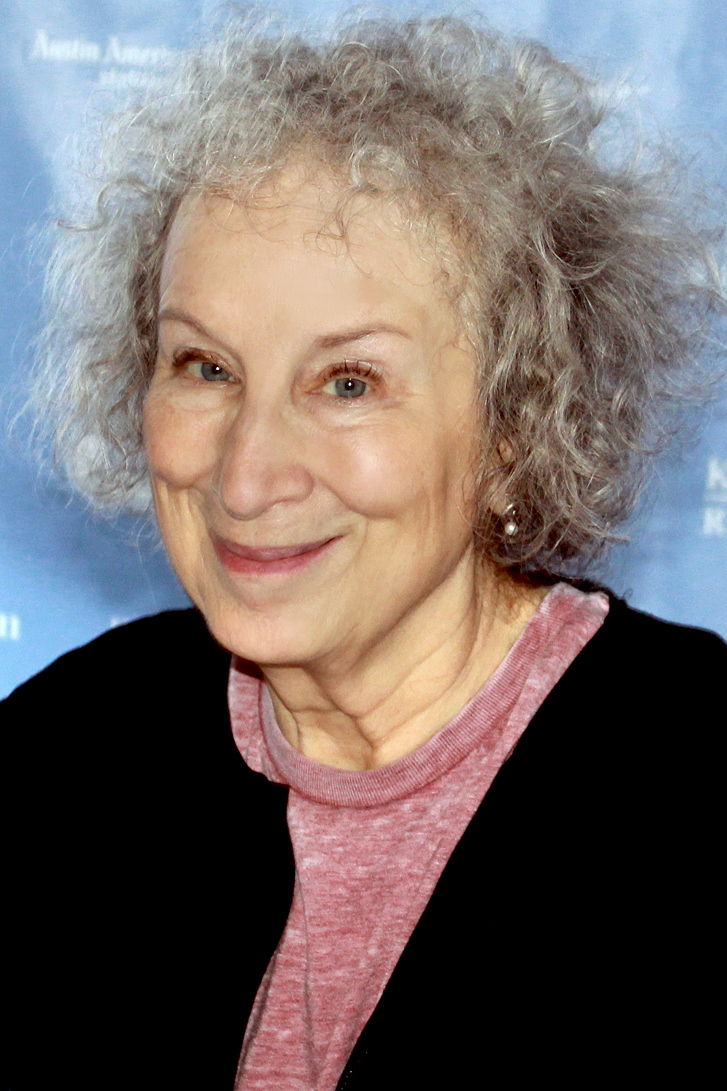
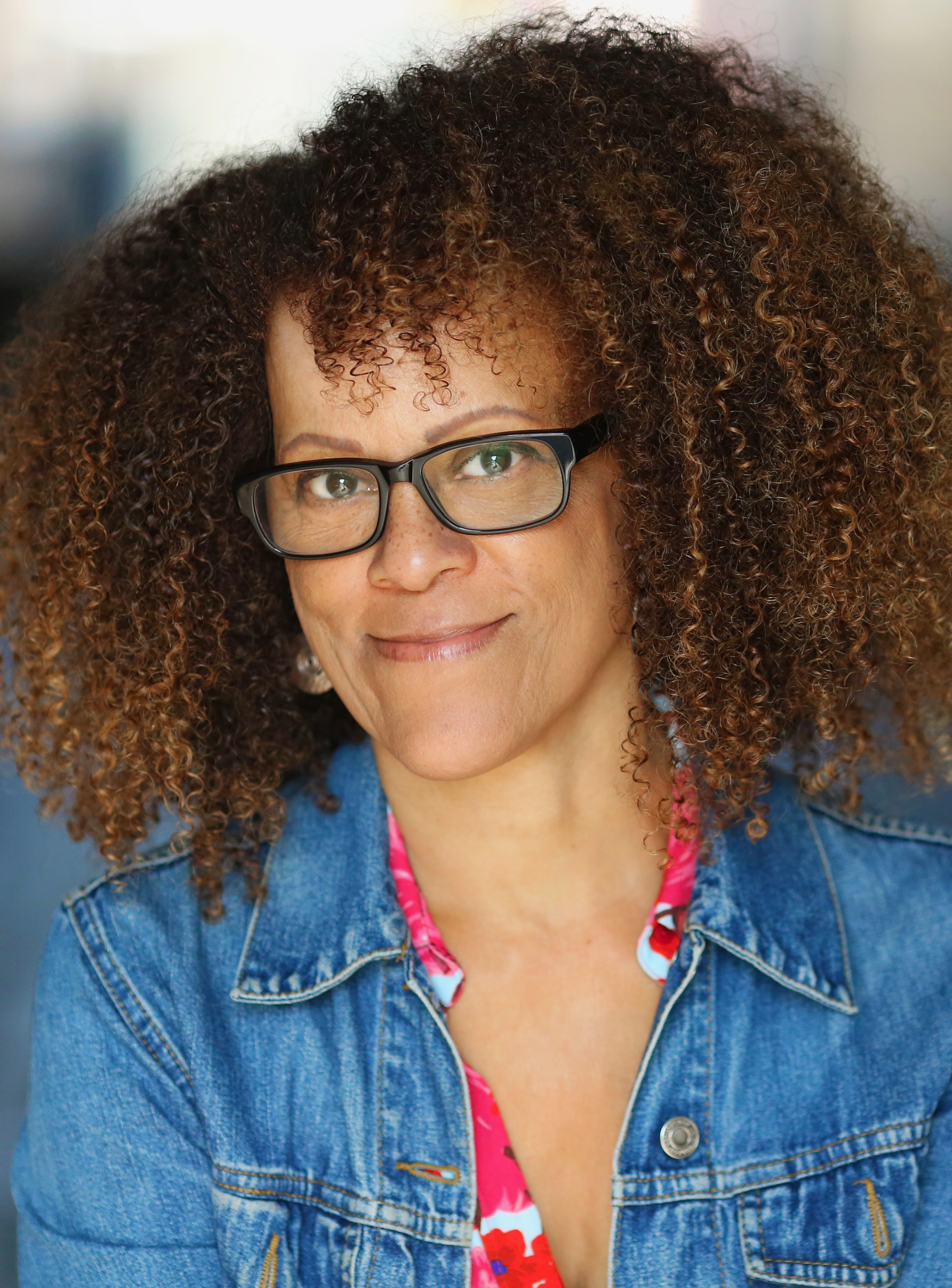
Margaret Atwood (left) and Bernardine Evaristo (right), joint winners of the 2019 Booker Prize

The 2019 Booker Prize for Fiction was announced on 14 October 2019. The Booker longlist of 13 books was announced on 23 July, and was narrowed down to a shortlist of six on 3 September. The Booker Prize was awarded jointly to Margaret Atwood for The Testaments and Bernardine Evaristo for Girl, Woman, Other. This was the first time the prize was shared since 1992, despite a rule change banning joint winners.

== Judging panel ==
- Peter Florence (chair)
- Liz Calder
- Xiaolu Guo
- Afua Hirsch
- Joanna MacGregor

== Nominees ==
indicates the winner

=== Shortlist ===
Author	Title	Genre(s)	Country	Publisher
Margaret Atwood	The Testaments	Novel	Canada	Vintage, Chatto & Windus
Bernardine Evaristo	Girl, Woman, Other	Novel	UK	Hamish Hamilton
Lucy Ellmann	Ducks, Newburyport	Novel	USA/UK	Galley Beggar Press
Chigozie Obioma	An Orchestra of Minorities	Novel	Nigeria	Little Brown
Salman Rushdie	Quichotte	Novel	UK/India	Jonathan Cape
Elif Shafak	10 Minutes 38 Seconds in This Strange World	Novel	UK/Turkey	Viking

=== Longlist ===
Author	Title	Genre(s)	Country	Publisher
Margaret Atwood	The Testaments	Novel	Canada	Vintage, Chatto & Windus
Kevin Barry	Night Boat to Tangier	Novel	Ireland	Canongate Books
Oyinkan Braithwaite	My Sister, the Serial Killer	Novel	UK/Nigeria	Atlantic Books
Lucy Ellmann	Ducks, Newburyport	Novel	USA/UK	Galley Beggar Press
Bernardine Evaristo	Girl, Woman, Other	Novel	UK	Hamish Hamilton
John Lanchester	The Wall	Novel	UK	Faber & Faber
Deborah Levy	The Man Who Saw Everything	Novel	UK	Hamish Hamilton
Valeria Luiselli	Lost Children Archive	Novel	Mexico/Italy	Fourth Estate
Chigozie Obioma	An Orchestra of Minorities	Novel	Nigeria	Little Brown
Max Porter	Lanny	Novel	UK	Faber & Faber
Salman Rushdie	Quichotte	Novel	UK/India	Jonathan Cape
Elif Shafak	10 Minutes 38 Seconds in This Strange World	Novel	UK/Turkey	Viking
Jeanette Winterson	Frankissstein	Novel	UK	Jonathan Cape

== See also ==
- List of winners and shortlisted authors of the Booker Prize for Fiction
