= Many and Many a Year Ago =

2008 novel by Selçuk Altun

- Paperback cover
- Author: Selçuk Altun
- Original title: Senelerce Senelerce Evveldi
- Translator: Clifford & Selhan Endres
- Language: Turkish
- Genre: Crime novel
- Publisher: Telegram Books
- Publication date: 2008
- Publication place: Turkey
- English publication date: 2009
- Media type: Print (Paperback)
- Pages: 238 pp
- ISBN: 978-1-84659-067-2

Many and Many a Year Ago (Turkish title: Senelerce Senelerce Evveldi) is a 2008 novel by Turkish writer Selçuk Altun republished in 2009 by Telegram Books in English language translation by Clifford and Selhan Endres.

== Plot ==
The novel tells the story of Kemal, a convalescing Turkish fighter pilot, who, after his friend mysteriously disappears, is left with a generous allowance and the use of his large house in Istanbul’s Taksim district. Kemal subsequently embarks on a mysterious mission following in the fictitious footsteps of American writer Edgar Allan Poe from Istanbul to Buenos Aires, and eventually to the Edgar Allan Poe museum in Boston where he decides to enter a writing competition with a novel called Many and Many a Year Ago.

This novel is, according to the author, “a literary thriller like my other novels,” but, “can also be regarded an ‘experimental mystery’ book,” as it, “also includes eight short stories that overlap with the novel's plot,” “told with an outlook similar to that of Scheherazade, the narrator of One Thousand and One Nights.” “It is part literature and part travel book, a little bit of Paul Auster and Bruce Chatwin,” he states, “what I tried to do was imagine what the life of a post-modern, well-off Poe would have been like.” “Now, I can only wonder what Americans, should they get the chance to read it, will think of my Turkish interpretation of this American master.”

== Publishing history ==
Telegram Books opted to translate and publish this novel following the commercial and critical success of the publication of Altun’s self-financed English language translation of his previous novel Songs My Mother Never Taught Me.

This is a novel that proceeds under the shadow of Edgar Allan Poe,” the author told Today's Zaman, “I started writing “Many and Many a Year Ago” in 2006, and it was published in Turkey in early 2008. I later noticed that 2009 was Poe's bicentennial. So actually, it neither had an effect on my decision to write this book, nor on its plot.” “It was sort of like its destiny that it's being introduced in the Anglo-American literary world in 2009, which is Poe's bicentennial.” “I hadn’t planned it this way, but it’s very gratifying,” he says.

“I take a lot of inspiration from Poe. While working on this book, I went to Poe’s graveside myself and I honestly believe he helped me with it.” “While I was walking rather hesitantly toward Poe's tomb in Baltimore, I had an ultra-interesting experience: It was at that very moment that I resolved the novel's finale in my head. I think that [moment] was an ultra surprising climax. Later I felt as though Poe was watching me allusively from his photograph on his headstone.”

== Reception ==
“I doubt whether such a book will receive much attention in the Anglo-American book industry,” the author told Today's Zaman, “But I would be happy if it does not go unnoticed. Usually my foremost concern is the risk of my publisher losing money because of me. But as far as I can see from the first orders in the UK, it seems I will not be putting a burden on my publisher.”
