= The Bastard of Istanbul =

2006 novel by Elif Shafak

- Author: Elif Shafak
- Language: English
- Genre: Drama
- Publisher: Viking Adult
- Publication date: 2006
- Publication place: Turkey
- Pages: 368
- ISBN: 0-670-03834-2
- OCLC: 1078210229

The Bastard of Istanbul is a 2006 novel by Elif Shafak, written originally in English and published by Viking Adult. It was translated by Aslı Biçen into her native language Turkish under the title Baba ve Piç in March 2006, and became a bestseller.

== Summary ==
The story is centred on the characters of Asya Kazancı and Armanoush Tchakhmakhchian. It is set in Tucson, Arizona; San Francisco, California; and Istanbul, Turkey. The novel deals with their families and how they are connected through the events of the 1915 Armenian genocide. At the age of nineteen, Armanoush travels secretly to Istanbul to search for her Armenian roots.

== Reception ==
Geraldine Bedell of The Guardian wrote: "The book is important for having drawn attention to the massacres and to the Turks' ambivalence about them, and for what it has exposed about freedom of speech. It's unquestionably an ambitious book, exuberant and teeming. But, perhaps because of the sometimes florid writing, reading it feels like holding a sack from which 20 very angry cats are fighting to escape."

Lorraine Adams of The New York Times wrote, "When the novel's skeleton finally dances out of its flimsy closet, it's clear that although Shafak may be a writer of moral compunction she has yet to become — in English, at any rate — a good novelist. A valuable moment in the klieg lights has been squandered, but Shafak, still in her 30s, has more than enough time to grow into a writer whose artistry matches her ambition."

== Trial against the author ==
In June 2006, Kemal Kerinçsiz, a nationalist lawyer, sued Elif Şafak for allegedly "insulting Turkishness" in her novel by dealing with the Armenian Genocide in the last years of the Ottoman Empire. The lawsuit was opened at Istanbul's Beyoğlu district court in accordance with Article 301 of the Turkish Criminal Code. After the prosecutor dropped the charges due to lack of insult, the lawyer refiled his complaint at a higher court, the Beyoglu 2nd Court of First Instance, in July 2006.

Şafak faced a sentence of up to three years in prison for the remarks made in her novel. In September 2006, the court, attended also by Joost Lagendijk, co-chair of the delegation to the EU–Turkey Joint Parliamentary Committee, acquitted her of criminal charges due to lack of legal grounds for the crime in question and insufficient evidence in the controversial trial.

== Theatre adaptation ==
The novel was adapted into a theatre play in the Italian language by Angelo Savelli titled La Bastarda Di Istanbul, and was staged by Teatro di Rifredi in Florence, Italy. Its premiere took place on March 3, 2015, starring Turkish actress Serra Yılmaz.
