= The Forty Rules of Love =

Novel by Elif Safak

- Author: Elif Shafak
- Language: English
- Genre: Literary fiction
- Publisher: Penguin Books
- Publication date: March 2009
- Publication place: Turkey
- Pages: 354
- Awards: Prix ALEF* - Mention Spéciale Littérature Etrangère
- ISBN: 9780141047188

The Forty Rules of Love is a novel written by the Turkish author Elif Shafak, The book was published in March 2009. It is about the Persian mystic poet Maulana Jalal-Ud-Din, known as Rumi and his companion Shams Tabrizi. This book explains how Shams transformed a scholar into a Sufi (mystic) through love. More than 750,000 copies of this book were sold in Turkey and France.

== Synopsis ==
"A novel enclosed by a novel, The Forty Rules of Love tells two parallel stories that coincide each other across two very different cultures and seven intervening centuries." It starts when a housewife, Ella, gets a book called Sweet Blasphemy for an appraisal. This book is about a thirteenth century poet, Shams Tabrizi, who was the spiritual teacher to Rumi. The book presents Shams's Forty Love Rules at different intervals. Sweet Blasphemy was structured in a way to focus on the five elements of nature: Water, Air, Earth, Fire and Void. The chapters in each section revealed a story in line with the nature of each element. The story presented in the novel is based on "love and spirituality that explains what it means to follow your heart".

=== The letter "b" ===
Every chapter of the book starts with letter "b". It is because the secret of Quran lies in Surah Al-Fatiha and its spirit is contained in the phrase Bismillah ir Rehman ir Rahim (In the name of Allah, the most Beneficent and the most Merciful). The first Arabic letter of the Bismillah has a dot below it that symbolizes the Universe as per Sufism thoughts. In the Urdu translation by Huma Anwar (Pakistan, 2017; ISBN 978-9696520672), this symbolic nuance has been retained — each chapter in the Urdu edition also begins with the letter "ب" (bey), mirroring the original concept. The translation received national literary recognition, including the Pakistan Academy of Letters Award for Best Translation (2017).

== Reception ==
The Forty Rules of Love won Prix ALEF* - Mention Spéciale Littérature Etrangère. It was also nominated for the 2012 International IMPAC Dublin Literary Award. On 5 November 2019 BBC News listed The Forty Rules of Love on its list of the 100 most influential novels. It was included in the "Love, Sex & Romance - February" category of Novels That Shaped Our World.
