= Aslı Biçen =

Turkish novelist and translator

- Born: Bursa, Turkey
- Education: Boğaziçi University
- Occupations: Translator, novelist
- Writing career
- Period: 1990 -
- Genre: Fiction
- Notable work: Snapping Point (2021)

Aslı Biçen is a Turkish novelist and translator.

== Biography ==
Born in 1970 in Bursa, Biçen graduated from the Department of English Language and Literature at Boğaziçi University. She is a founding member of the Turkish Association of Literary Translators (ÇEVBIR). Since 1990, she has translated over 50 titles, including those of Charles Dickens, William Faulkner, Ursula K. Le Guin, Anne Carson, and Salman Rushdie, into Turkish. She has also translated the English-language novels of Turkish writer Elif Shafak into Turkish. In 2006, Biçen, Shafak, and Hüseyin Semih Sökmen, the publishing executive, were prosecuted for the publication and translation of Shafak's novel, The Bastard of Istanbul, on the charges of "denigrating Turkishness" per Article 301 of the Turkish Penal Code. The Beyoğlu Court of Justice dismissed the charges for a lack of evidence.

As an author, Biçen has published three novels in Turkish: Elime Tutun (Hold My Hand) (2005), İnceldiği Yerden (Snapping Point) (2008), and Tehdit Mektupları (Threat Letters) (2011). In 2021, Istros Books published her novel İnceldiği Yerden as Snapping Point, translated by Feyza Howell.

== Selected works ==
=== Translator ===
- Carson, Anne (2012), Kırmızının Otobiyografisi (Autobiography of Red), Istanbul: Metis Yayınları, ISBN 978-9753428569
- Dickens, Charles (2001), Kasvetli ev (Bleak House), Istanbul: YKY, ISBN 9750800958
- Dickens, Charles (2010), Müşterek dostumuz (Our Mutual Friend), Istanbul: İthaki Yayınları, ISBN 978-6053750345
- Faulkner, William (2004), Abşalom, Abşalom! (Absalom, Absalom!), Istanbul: Yapı Kredi, ISBN 9750802128
- Lawrence, D. H. (2016), Çizgiyi aşmak (The Trespasser), Istanbul: Metis Yayınları, ISBN 978-6053160311
- Le Guin, Ursula (2012), Aya tırmanmak ve diğer öyküler (Unlocking the air and other stories), Istanbul: Metis Yayınları, ISBN 978-9753428873
- Rushdie, Salman (2012), Geceyarısı çocukları (Midnight's Children), Istanbul: Can Yayınları, ISBN 9789750715266
- Rushdie, Salman (2005), Utanç (Shame), Istanbul: Metis Yayınları, ISBN 9750718313

=== Author ===
- Biçen, Aslı (2005), Elime Tutun, Istanbul: Metis Yayınları, ISBN 9753425058
- Biçen, Aslı (2008), İnceldiği yerden, Istanbul: Metis Yayınları, ISBN 978-9753426558
- Biçen, Aslı (2011), Tehdit mektupları, Istanbul: Metis Yayınları, ISBN 978-9753428279
