= Girl, Woman, Other =

2019 novel by Bernardine Evaristo

- First edition cover
- Author: Bernardine Evaristo
- Audio read by: Anna-Maria Nabirye
- Cover artist: Neil Kenlock (photos); Ali Campbell (design)
- Language: English
- Genre: Postmodern literature, LGBTQ+ fiction, postcolonial literature
- Set in: United Kingdom
- Publisher: Hamish Hamilton
- Publication date: 2 May 2019
- Publication place: United Kingdom
- Media type: Print (hard and paperback) and e-book
- Pages: 464
- Awards: 2019 Booker Prize
- ISBN: 978-0-241-36490-1
- OCLC: 1114328373
- Dewey Decimal: 823/.92
- LC Class: PR6055.V25 G57 2019

Girl, Woman, Other is a novel by English writer Bernardine Evaristo. Published in 2019 by Hamish Hamilton, it follows the lives of 12 characters in the United Kingdom over the course of several decades. The book was the co-winner of the 2019 Booker Prize, alongside Margaret Atwood's The Testaments.

Girl, Woman, Other has received more than 30 Book of the Year and Decade honours, alongside recognition as one of Barack Obama's top 19 books for 2019 and Roxane Gay's favourite book of 2019. Its prizes include Fiction Book of the Year at the 2020 British Book Awards, where Evaristo also won Author of the Year. Additionally, the novel won the Indie Book Award for Fiction and the Gold Medal of Honorary Patronage. It was finalist for the Orwell Prize for Political Fiction, the Australia Book Industry Awards, and the Women's Prize for Fiction.

== Overview ==
Girl, Woman, Other follows the lives of each of 12 principal characters as they navigate the world. The book is divided into four chapters, each containing episodes about three people who are connected directly to one another in some way, the majority as relatives (such as mother and daughter). Although each character has their own chapter set across a particular time, their lives intertwine in numerous ways – from friends and relatives to chance acquaintances.

The book opens with a playwright, Amma, anticipating the opening of her new production, The Last Amazon of Dahomey, at a theatre in London. The play is based around the fictional life of a Dahomey Amazon. The last chapter of the book takes place at the party that follows the play's opening night, in which many of the characters are present and interact, though not necessarily knowing one another. The epilogue contains a plot twist after which the story concludes:

this is not about feeling something or about speaking words

this is about being

together

Among the themes explored in the characters' lives are racism, feminism, politics, patriarchy, success, relationships, gender, and sexuality. Asked about her motivation for writing the work, Evaristo said:

I wanted to put presence into absence. I was very frustrated that black British women weren't visible in literature. I whittled it down to 12 characters – I wanted them to span from a teenager to someone in their 90s, and see their trajectory from birth, though not linear. There are many ways in which otherness can be interpreted in the novel – the women are othered in so many ways and sometimes by each other. I wanted it to be identified as a novel about women as well.

=== Overview of the characters in the novel ===
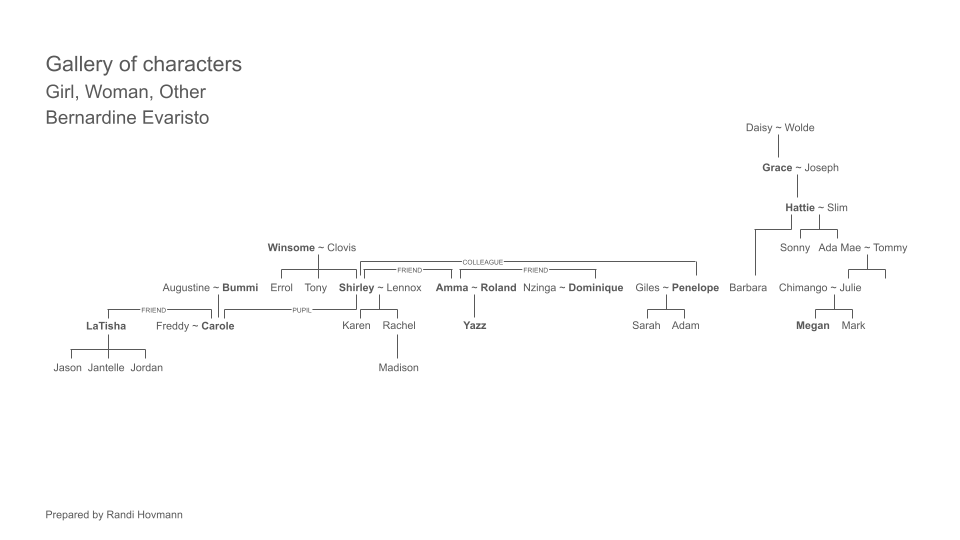
Overview of the characters in the novel Girl, Woman, Other

The novel spans several generations and describes family relations, friendships, colleagueship, mentor-mentee relationships, classmates, study groups, etc.

All of these are inferred, and it is up to the reader to remember who is who. This overview maps out the relationships. The youngest generation is at the bottom, the eldest in the top.

== Themes ==
=== Intersectionality ===
The novel explores how race, sexuality, gender, history and economic stratification intersect to define the experiences of the women in the novel. At university Yazz establishes a group of friends who share the commonality of being people of colour. She becomes hostile to Courtney, a white girl from Suffolk, joining their group, arguing she would not be able to relate to the experience of being "one of the few brown girls on a white campus". On a trip to London to visit her friend Nenet, the daughter of an Egyptian diplomat, she discovers that her friend is very wealthy, and has had her university papers written for her by a retired professor. Yazz is alienated by the experience, and recognises that even as a woman of colour, her life is more similar to that of her lower-middle-class white friend. Courtney, herself born into a farming background, which addresses the intersectional flaws of only considering the racial element of social privilege. Citing Roxane Gay, she states:

Roxane Gay warned against the idea of playing "privilege Olympics" and wrote in Bad Feminist that privilege is relative and contextual, and I agree, Yazz, I mean, where does it all end? is Obama less privileged than a white hillbilly growing up in a trailer park with a junkie single mother and a jailbird father? is a severely disabled person more privileged than a Syrian asylum-seeker who has been tortured? Roxane argues that we have to find a new discourse for discussing inequality.

This idea is sustained throughout the book. Despite the 12 women in the book experiencing various forms of oppression, many of them contribute to intersectional forms of exclusionism because of their life experiences, class and social standing. Many of the characters "other" each other. Dominique's reductive view of Shirley as a "dry heterosexual schoolteacher" closes her off from discovering how similar their life experiences have been. Penelope, who through most of her life is in fact unaware of her light-skinned Black parentage, others Bummi, simply describing Bummi as her "African cleaner" (the former having been raised by her adoptive parents to believe that Whites were the master race). When Penelope discovers her true African heritage (Hattie), she abandons her racist sentiments, realising Hattie's story is undeniably intertwined with her own.

Suggesting a solution for Gay's new discourse for discussing inequality, Evaristo provides the narratives of these 12 characters so that readers can sincerely relate to their experiences on a humanistic level rather than reducing them to a stereotype.

== Reception ==
=== Critical response ===
Emily Rhodes of the Financial Times said: "Evaristo writes sensitively about how we raise children, how we pursue careers, how we grieve and how we love", while Johanna Thomas-Corr of The Sunday Times describes Girl, Woman, Other as: "a triumphantly wide-ranging novel, told in a hybrid of prose and poetry, about the struggles, longings, conflicts and betrayals of 12 (mostly) black women and one non-binary character." Evaristo's polyphony of voices is successful and compelling, according to Josie Mitchell of Literary Review, who writes: "The perspectives complement and contest one another, amounting to a glorious, atmospheric set of ventriloquisms." According to Sarah Ladipo Manyika, writing for the New Statesman, Evaristo "continues to expand and enhance our literary canon. If you want to understand modern-day Britain, this is the writer to read."

=== Accolades ===
Girl, Woman, Other was joint winner (with Margaret Atwood's The Testaments) of the 2019 Booker Prize, and was shortlisted for the 2019 Gordon Burn Prize. The Booker judges described the work as "a must-read about modern Britain and womanhood". It was named one of the top ten books of 2019 by the Washington Post.

Girl, Woman, Other was one of Barack Obama's 19 favourite books of 2019 and Roxane Gay's favourite book of 2019, and is the 12th bestselling hardback fiction book in the UK. It stands as a Sunday Times bestseller and book of the decade for The Guardian, and was identified as book of the year 25 times, including as O, The Oprah Magazine's best LGBT book, Time magazine's 100 must read books, CBC's 28 best international fiction, Elle's 13 best feminist books, Amazon editors' pick of the year and Apple Books best of the year, as well as The Times' best audio book of 2019.

Evaristo received recognition as one of the Financial Times's Women in 2019: the game changers and is currently shortlisted for the Women's Prize, British Book Awards: Fiction Book of the Year/ and Publishing Triangle Awards (USA). Featured in OkayAfrica's 100 Women 2020 she is also longlisted for the Orwell Prize for Political Fiction, Glass Bell Award, Australian Book Industry Awards and Visionary Honours Awards.

Girl, Woman, Other was included on the "Big Jubilee Read" list of 70 books selected by a panel of experts, and announced by the BBC and The Reading Agency in April 2022, to celebrate the Platinum Jubilee of Elizabeth II in June 2022.
