= Honour (book) =

Novel by Elif Shafak

- Cover of Viking first edition (2012)
- Author: Elif Shafak
- Publisher: Viking
- Publication date: 2012
- Pages: 342
- ISBN: 9780670921157
- Dewey Decimal: 813.6
- Website: www.elifsafak.com.tr/books/21

Honour is a novel by Elif Shafak, published in 2012 by Viking. The book is the ninth novel by Shafak, and her fourth written in English. It was rereleased by Penguin Essentials in 2020.
