= The Island of Missing Trees =

2021 novel by Elif Shafak

- Author: Elif Shafak
- Language: English
- Publisher: Viking
- Publication date: 2021
- ISBN: 1635578590

The Island of Missing Trees is a 2021 novel by Turkish writer Elif Shafak. Set in Cyprus and London, it follows a romantic relationship between a Greek Cypriot and Turkish Cypriot. It was released by Viking Press in 2021.

== Summary ==
The story has two timelines, one set in 2010s London following 16-year old Ada Kazantzakis, and the other following Ada's parents Kostas (a Greek Cypriot) and Defne (a Turkish Cypriot) on the island of Cyprus in the 1970s and 2000s. A third narrative voice is a fig tree, which observes events and offers insight into the characters’ past, the natural world, and the history of Cyprus.

Ada is disconnected from her Cypriot heritage and grieving Defne's death, which has also distanced her from Kostas. Before winter break, she uncontrollably screams in class from stress, a video of which goes viral. Kostas buries his fig tree, which he grew from a cutting from a fig tree in a Cypriot tavern called The Happy Fig, to protect it from an impending winter storm. The tree recalls the love between Kostas and Defne when they were teenagers in 1974. Despite steadily worsening relations between Greeks and Turks on the island, the liaison was enabled by The Happy Fig's owners, Yiorgos and Yusuf, a homosexual Greek/Turkish couple. Kostas and Defne lost their virginities to each other over that summer.

To Ada's surprise—as she has never met or spoken to any of her relatives on Cyprus—Defne's older sister Meryem comes to stay for a few days. Ada is initially dismissive of her aunt's superstitions, frivolity, and devotion to traditions.

Kostas's mother abruptly forced him to move to her brother's home in London to avoid the 1974 Cypriot coup d'état. Defne severed contact with Kostas. In the succeeding decades, Kostas became an ecologist and botanist, while Defne became an archeologist. They reunited in Cyprus in the 2000s, where Kostas observed Defne's work with the Committee on Missing Persons, searching for and identifying human remains throughout the island. Kostas was devastated to learn that their prior romance resulted in a pregnancy. Defne had planned for a discrete abortion at the Happy Fig, but the procedure was interrupted by a homophobic group who bombed the tavern and kidnapped Yusuf and Yiorgos. She ultimately kept the baby and named him Yiorgos Yusuf; the child was adopted by an English couple before dying of an apparent plague. Yusuf and Yiorgos' remains were finally found at the bottom of a well.

Defne agreed to marry Kostas and move to London. However, she remained adamant that their child be raised unaware of the generational violence that plagued their families and Cyprus as a whole. Defne eventually became an alcoholic; Ada suggests that Defne's death was a suicide and worries that she has inherited her mother's mental health issues. Meryem encourages her and tells her about her and Defne's childhood. After Meryem departs, Ada reaches out to Kostas and returns to school more confident. It is revealed that the fig tree's narration is Defne's, her soul having incarnated into the tree to watch over her family.

== Reception ==
Kirkus Reviews called the novel "Ambitious, thought-provoking, and poignant." Writing for The Washington Post, Ron Charles said of Shafak's writing: "She's that rare alchemist who can mix grains of tragedy and delight without diminishing the savor of either. The results may sometimes feel surreal, but this technique allows her to capture the impossibly strange events of real life." Writing positively in The Guardian, Leone Ross noted: "when Shafak goes deeper into its arboreal life, the tree's voice is a delight...and when the novel's sure and towering end arrived, nearly all Shafak's decisions made sense, moving me to tears and humbling me with the confidence of a storyteller for whom every decision is deliberate. This is a beautiful novel – imperfect, but made ferocious by its uncompromising empathy."

The novel was chosen as the November 2021 Reese's Book Club pick.
