= My Sister, the Serial Killer =

2018 novel by Oyinkan Braithwaite

- First edition
- Author: Oyinkan Braithwaite
- Language: English
- Genre: Thriller
- Publisher: Doubleday Books
- Publication date: 20 November 2018
- Publication place: Nigeria
- ISBN: 9780385544238

My Sister, the Serial Killer is a 2018 thriller novel by Nigerian writer Oyinkan Braithwaite. Braithwaite's debut novel was originally published in Nigeria as an e-book with the title Thicker Than Water in 2017 before being released in the United States by Doubleday Books on 20 November 2018.

== Plot ==
In Lagos, Nigeria, Korede is a nurse in a close relationship with her younger sister, Ayoola. Ayoola is the more beautiful, favored sister, and possibly sociopathic. For the third time in a row, Ayoola has stabbed her boyfriend to death, supposedly in self-defense. Like the previous times, Korede helps dispose of the body and clean away the evidence. Her practicality and concern keep Ayoola from acting suspiciously about her “missing” boyfriend, such as by posting to social media when she should be mourning.

Korede feels unappreciated as she constantly dreads that they will be caught and that Ayoola will kill again. She confides in none but a comatose patient in the hospital she works at. She is in love with Tade, a kind, handsome doctor who does not notice her affection. However, upon meeting Ayoola, he is immediately enamored with her and they begin dating. Korede fears that Tade will be Ayoola's next victim and must reckon with what she is willing to do for her sister.

== Reception ==
My Sister, the Serial Killer was described by Deadline as a "darkly comedic story, buzzed-about in publishing circles."

The novel won the 2019 Los Angeles Times Book Prize for Best Mystery/Thriller, the 2019 Amazon Publishing Reader's Award for Best Debut Novel, the 2019 Anthony Award for Best First Novel, and the 2020 British Book Award for Crime & Thriller Book of the Year. The novel was longlisted for the 2019 Booker Prize and was the second-highest best-selling title on the list as of July 2019, with 13,052 units sold according to Nielsen BookScan.

My Sister, the Serial Killer has been praised by The New York Times, The Washington Post, Marie Claire and authors Ayọ̀bámi Adébáyọ̀ and Edgar Cantero. In 2018, the novel was considered for a movie adaptation by the producers of Baby Driver.
