= The Testaments =

2019 novel by Margaret Atwood

- Cover of the first edition
- Author: Margaret Atwood
- Audio read by: Ann Dowd; Bryce Dallas Howard; Mae Whitman; Derek Jacobi; Tantoo Cardinal; Margaret Atwood
- Cover artist: Noma Bar / Dutch Uncle
- Language: English
- Genre: Speculative fiction, Dystopian fiction
- Publisher: McClelland & Stewart (Canada); Nan A. Talese (US); Chatto & Windus (UK)
- Publication date: September 10, 2019
- Publication place: Canada
- Media type: Print (Hardcover)
- Pages: 432
- ISBN: 978-0-385-54378-1
- Dewey Decimal: 813.54
- LC Class: PR9199.3.A8
- Preceded by: The Handmaid's Tale

The Testaments is a 2019 novel by Margaret Atwood. It is the sequel to The Handmaid's Tale (1985). The novel is set 15 years after the events of The Handmaid's Tale. It is narrated by Aunt Lydia, a character from the previous novel; Agnes Jemima, a young woman living in Gilead; and Daisy, a young woman living in Canada.

The Testaments was a joint winner of the 2019 Booker Prize, alongside Bernardine Evaristo's novel Girl, Woman, Other. It was also voted the Best Fiction novel in the Goodreads Choice Awards 2019, winning by over 50,000 votes.

Streaming service Hulu, which also produced the TV series adaptation of The Handmaid's Tale, announced in 2022 that it would also adapt The Testaments into its own TV series after The Handmaid's Tale's final season concluded. The adaptation, in which Ann Dowd reprised her role as Aunt Lydia, premiered on April 8, 2026.

== Plot summary ==
Lydia, a divorced judge, is imprisoned with other women in a stadium during the establishment of the Republic of Gilead, an authoritarian theonomic state. After enduring weeks of squalid conditions, torture, and solitary confinement, culminating in coerced participation in an execution, she and a small group of other women are handpicked by Commander Judd and Vidala, a pre-existing supporter of Gilead, to become Aunts—an elite group of women tasked with creating and overseeing the laws and uniforms governing Gilead's women. The Aunts use Ardua Hall as their headquarters and enjoy certain privileges that include reading "forbidden" texts, such as Cardinal John Henry Newman's Apologia Pro Vita Sua. In secret, Aunt Lydia despises Gilead and becomes a mole supplying critical information to the resistance organization Mayday.

Fifteen years after the events of The Handmaid's Tale, Agnes Jemima is growing up in Boston as the adopted daughter of Commander Kyle and his wife Tabitha. Agnes has a loving relationship with Tabitha, who later dies of ill health. Agnes and her classmates, Becka and Shunammite, attend an elite preparatory school for the daughters of Commanders, where they are taught to run a household, but not to become literate. Once widowed, Commander Kyle marries Paula, the widow of a deceased Commander, who despises Agnes. Desiring a child for herself, she acquires a Handmaid, who successfully conceives but later dies giving birth to a son. Agnes is arranged to be married to Commander Judd, now a high-ranking official in charge of the Eyes, a surveillance group.

Learning that she is the daughter of a Handmaid, Agnes escapes her arranged marriage by becoming a Supplicant, a prospective Aunt. In that pursuit, she joins Becka, whose father — Doctor Grove, a prominent dentist — has been sexually abusing her and his other underage female patients for years. Later, Agnes is anonymously provided with files highlighting the corruption and hypocrisy at the heart of Gilead, specifically evidence of adultery between Commander Kyle and Paula and their plots to murder their respective spouses, and of Commander Judd's murders of his previous wives since divorce is prohibited. She also learns that she is the half-sister of "Baby Nicole", a girl who was smuggled out of Gilead to Canada by her Handmaid mother when she was young (and whose return Gilead has been demanding).

Meanwhile, Daisy — several years younger than Agnes — grows up in Toronto with her parents, Neil and Melanie. The couple owns a second-hand clothing store serving as a front for Mayday to smuggle women out of Gilead. On Daisy's 16th birthday, Neil and Melanie are murdered by undercover Gileadean operatives. Mayday operatives reveal that Neil and Melanie were not her biological parents and that she is actually Nicole. They enlist Daisy in a mission to infiltrate Gilead to obtain valuable intelligence. Nicole poses as a street urchin named Jade to be recruited by the Pearl Girls (Gilead missionaries who lure foreign women to Gilead with the promise of a better life).

The disguised Nicole is placed under the care of Agnes and Becka, now named Aunts Victoria and Immortelle. Aunt Lydia confirms that "Jade" is Nicole through a tattoo and discloses her true identity and parentage to Agnes and Becka. Revealing herself as Mayday's mole, Aunt Lydia enlists the three young women to smuggle incriminating information about Gilead's elite into Canada. Nicole is tasked with carrying the files inside a microdot on her cruciform tattoo. Agnes and Nicole are to enter Canada disguised as Pearl Girls, with Nicole and Becka swapping identities and Becka attending a retreat to provide cover. Forced to hasten their plans when Commander Judd learns about Nicole's presence and intends to marry her, Agnes and Nicole set out early, assaulting Aunt Vidala and sending her to a hospital. They travel to the coast and board a ship that takes them into Canadian waters, from which they are picked up by a Mayday team and reunited with their birth mother. Meanwhile, Aunt Lydia, to buy Agnes and Nicole some more time and to secure her own position at Ardua Hall, tells Aunt Elizabeth that Aunt Vidala has accused her of the assault, expecting Elizabeth to kill Vidala.

Using the contents of Nicole's microdot, the Canadian media leaks scandalous information about Gilead's elite, which leads to a purge that in turn causes a military coup and popular revolt, weakening Gilead and leading to its fall and the restoration of the USA at the hands of Mayday and the US holdouts. Becka is found dead inside a water cistern, having hidden there to perpetuate the ruse that "Jade" had run off with a plumber. Lydia, the author of the Ardua Hall Holograph, closes her story by describing her plan to commit suicide with a morphine overdose before she can be questioned and executed.

The novel concludes with a metafictional epilogue, described as a partial transcript at the Thirteenth Symposium on Gileadean Studies in 2197, presented by Professor James Darcy Pieixoto. He discusses the challenges in verifying the authenticity of the Ardua Hall Holograph and the two witness transcripts by Agnes and Nicole. He also speculates that Agnes and Nicole's Handmaid mother could be Offred of the previous book, though he himself admits to not being sure, and that Aunt Lydia being the Mayday operative was just a cover to protect the real operative's identity. He concludes by mentioning a statue that was made commemorating Becka for her actions, its dedication having been attended by Agnes and Nicole, their children and grandchildren, their mother and their fathers.

== Characters ==
=== Aunt Lydia ===
The first protagonist, Aunt Lydia, first appeared as an antagonist in The Handmaid's Tale. She chronicles her life in an illicit manuscript, including details of her life before Gilead and how she came to be made an Aunt. She also meditates on the inner workings of Gilead's theonomy, its hypocrisy, and endemic corruption. Lydia's manuscript is later published as the Ardua Hall Holograph, one of the three documents referred to in the novel's title. The provenance of Aunt Lydia's work, like that of Offred's which was published as The Handmaid's Tale, is in question. In The Testaments, Aunt Lydia emerges as a woman who accepts that she must do what is necessary to stay alive, but who quietly tries to work within the system to pursue a measure of justice, fairness, and compassion.

=== Agnes Jemima (Aunt Victoria/Witness 369A) ===
The second protagonist, Agnes Jemima, is the adopted child of the high-ranking Commander Kyle and his wife Tabitha. She is enrolled in the prestigious Vidala School, where they learn skills such as painting and embroidery–skills thought to be appropriate for the future Wives of Commanders. After Tabitha's death, Commander Kyle marries Paula, who tries to remove Agnes from the family by arranging to marry her off to Commander Judd, who is known to marry young girls and murder them when they grow too old. Agnes escapes this predicament by claiming to have a higher calling and wishing to serve the women of her country. She goes to Ardua Hall as a Supplicant, where she is taught to read and write in preparation to become an Aunt. Here, she takes the name Victoria from the list of approved names for Aunts. She also grows closer to her former classmate Becka, who is another Supplicant studying to become an Aunt.

During the course of her stay at Ardua Hall, she is sent several files from an anonymous source (later revealed to be Aunt Lydia). The files contain details about the various crimes committed by the high-ranking officials of Gilead, thus making Agnes aware of the corruption at the heart of her country. In one such file, she finds out the truth of her parentage—her biological mother was a Handmaid who had escaped to Canada and is currently working for Mayday. She also realizes that her mother had another child, Baby Nicole (later revealed to be Daisy/Jade), who was smuggled to safety in Canada during her infancy.

She meets her half-sister Nicole at Ardua Hall, and then agrees to go with her to Canada in order to transport documents containing information about the leaders of Gilead.

=== Nicole (Daisy/Jade/Witness 369B) ===
The third protagonist, Nicole (also known as Daisy), is the daughter of a Handmaid who smuggled her out of Gilead and into Canada as a baby. She lives in Toronto with her adoptive parents Neil and Melanie, who own a second-hand clothing store called the Clothes Hound. Like Agnes, Nicole is raised without any knowledge of her true origins. She takes an interest in human rights violations in neighboring Gilead.

=== Becka (Aunt Immortelle) ===
A primary supporting character. Like Agnes, she is the daughter of a Handmaid adopted by a Gileadean family and is being prepared for a high-status marriage. However, her "father" is not a Commander but rather an important figure, a dentist, in the Gileadean upper class. She holds a dark secret of being the victim of rape and incest. When she becomes a Supplicant, she takes the name Aunt Immortelle.

=== Commander Judd ===
One of the antagonists in the novel, Commander Judd was first mentioned in The Handmaid's Tale as one of the two possible identities of Offred's Commander. A high-ranking Commander, he was one of the few who orchestrated the coup against the United States and the establishment of Gilead. He recruited Aunt Lydia as an Aunt and tasked her to establish a 'Sphere' for women in society, and Aunt Lydia in return reports to him on the Aunts' activities. It is stated in the book he has started to lose favour among the other Commanders, and wishes to marry Nicole to elevate his political standing.

== Reception ==
Serena Davies of The Daily Telegraph described The Testaments as "a lurid and powerful sequel". She concluded: "Atwood has given us a blockbuster of propulsive, almost breathless narrative, stacked with twists and turns worthy of a Gothic novel". In Literary Review, Sarah Crown commends The Testaments as "politically and emotionally satisfying", although it is, compared to The Handmaid's Tale, lacking in "the richness and the sense of jeopardy" as a result of Atwood's exchange of her earlier novel's ambiguity for clarity.

In an interview by Martha Teichner, for CBS News Sunday Morning, Atwood insisted the novel contains "tons of hope—lots and lots of hope" when questioned about the premise. Michiko Kakutani, writing for The New York Times, contrasts Atwood's thesis of writing one's testimony being an "act of hope", against "the pompous, myopic Gileadean scholars who narrate the satirical epilogues" of both The Handmaid's Tale and The Testaments.

The book was shortlisted for the 2020 Fiction Book of the Year in the British Book Awards.

== Television adaptation ==
Atwood wrote The Testaments in coordination with the ongoing The Handmaid's Tale television series, letting the producers know where she was taking the sequel and affirming certain characters' storylines are not affected by how they appear in The Testaments, since the setting of the television series is several years away from directly portraying events in this novel. Bruce Miller, producer of the television series, has acknowledged the new novel's storyline will be taken into account as the series continues.

In March 2023, Miller stepped down as showrunner of The Handmaid's Tale in order to focus on adapting The Testaments for television.

In February 2025, The Testaments was nearing a series greenlight and has cast Chase Infiniti as one of the three leads Agnes, joining The Handmaid’s Tale‘s Ann Dowd, who had been expected to reprise her role as Lydia. Miller executive produces alongside fellow Handmaid’s Tale executive producer Warren Littlefield of The Littlefield Company, with MGM Television as the studio.

In March 2025, it was announced that Lucy Halliday joined the series as co-lead Daisy. Later that month, it was announced that Mike Barker will direct the first three episodes and also executive produce the series. It was also announced that Rowan Blanchard and Mattea Conforti joined the cast as Shunammite and Becka respectively.

In April 2025, Hulu officially ordered The Testaments to series. The Handmaid’s Tale lead Elisabeth Moss will executive produce the project alongside Miller, Littlefield, Barker, Steve Stark, Shana Stein, Maya Goldsmith, John Weber, Sheila Hockin, Daniel Wilson, and Fran Sears. Priscilla Poriand will serve as co-executive producer. It was also announced that Mabel Li, Amy Seimetz, Brad Alexander, Zarrin Darnell-Martin, Eva Foote, Isolde Ardies, Shechinah Mpumlwana, Birva Pandya, and Kira Guloien joined the cast as Aunt Vidala, Paula, Garth, Aunt Gabban, Aunt Estee, Hulda, Jehosheba, Miriam, and Rosa respectively. The production of the series began on April 7. Principal photography wrapped on August 15.

The show premiered on April 8, 2026.

== Formats ==
The novel was released simultaneously as a book and as an audiobook featuring Ann Dowd reprising and narrating the lead role of Aunt Lydia. Atwood said that Dowd's performance as Aunt Lydia in the TV series helped inspire the new novel. The role of Agnes is read by Bryce Dallas Howard, while Daisy/Nicole is read by Mae Whitman. Tantoo Cardinal and Derek Jacobi read the roles of scholars in the epilogue. The audiobook also features Atwood herself.

In a separate adaptation, in 2019, BBC Radio 4 serialized the novel in 15 quarter-hour episodes.
