= Frankissstein =

2019 novel by Jeanette Winterson

Frankissstein: A Love Story
- First edition cover
- Author: Jeanette Winterson
- Audio read by: John Sackville; Perdita Weeks; Harrison Knights
- Language: English
- Genres: Speculative fiction; historical fiction
- Publisher: Jonathan Cape
- Publication date: 28 May 2019
- Publication place: United Kingdom
- Media type: Print (hardcover and paperback)
- Pages: 352
- ISBN: 978-1-78733-140-2 (hardcover)
- Dewey Decimal: 823.914
- LC Class: PR6073.I558 F73 2019

Frankissstein: A Love Story is a 2019 novel by Jeanette Winterson. It was published on 28 May 2019 by Jonathan Cape. The novel employs speculative fiction and historical fiction to reimagine Mary Shelley's classic novel Frankenstein (1818). The story switches between Mary Shelley writing Frankenstein in Geneva, Switzerland in 1816 and the story of Ry Shelley, a transgender doctor and Victor Stein, a transhumanist, who become involved in the world of artificial intelligence and cryonics in present-day Brexit-era Britain.

It was longlisted for the 2019 Booker Prize.

== Reception ==
Kirkus Reviews and Publishers Weekly both praised the novel, with the latter calling it "vividly imagined and gorgeously constructed."

Writing for The Guardian, British novelist Sam Byers gave the novel a rave review, praising Winterson's ability "to leaven the hyperinvention of rogue science with deeply evocative historical realism."

Sarah Lotz, writing for The New York Times Book Review, praised Winterson's scenes of Mary Shelley as "visceral and seeped with Gothic gloom" and called the novel "both deeply thought-provoking and provocative yet also unabashedly entertaining."

Ron Charles of The Washington Post gave the novel a rave review, praising its dialogue and calling it "an unholy amalgamation of scholarship and comedy."

Holly Williams of The Independent gave the novel a positive review, calling it "enjoyably audacious" but also felt it to be "overstuffed" with Winterson's research and its satiric dialogue "too crude to be convincing."

Sam Sacks of The Wall Street Journal gave the novel a favourable review, writing, "This is a book whose mismatched parts—subtle historical drama and philosophical allegory; bawdy humor and profound moral inquiries—somehow combine to form a powerful, living whole."

Writing in the New Statesman, Ben Myers panned the novel, criticizing it for Winterson's "cramming in of so many ethical and philosophical points of discussion, often by way of didactic and totally implausible dialogue [...] it feels as if Winterson is playing to the contemporary woke crowd."

== Publication history ==
- Frankissstein: A Love Story. United Kingdom: Jonathan Cape. 28 May 2019. ISBN 978-1-78733-140-2.
- Frankissstein: A Love Story. United States: Grove Press. 1 October 2019. ISBN 978-0-8021-2949-9.
- Frankissstein: Eine Liebesgeschichte (in German). Translated by Walitzek, Brigitte; Grabinger, Michaela. Germany: Kein & Aber. 8 October 2019. ISBN 978-3-0369-5810-1.
- Frankissstein: una historia de amor (in Spanish). Translated by Martín de Dios, Laura. Spain: Editorial Lumen. 24 March 2020. ISBN 978-84-264-0643-9.
- Frankissstein: una storia d'amore (in Italian). Translated by Spallino Rocca, Chiara. Italy: Mondadori. 12 November 2019. ISBN 9788804718628.
- Frankissstein: una història d'amor (in Catalan). Translated by Udina, Dolors. Catalonia: Edicions del Periscopi. November 2019. ISBN 978-84-17339-29-6.
- Frankissstein: en kärlekshistoria (in Swedish). Translated by Fries-Gedin, Lena [in Swedish]. Sweden: Wahlström & Widstrand. 23 January 2020. ISBN 978-91-46-23598-9.

== See also ==
- Frankenstein in popular culture
