= The Architect's Apprentice =

Novel by Elif Safak

- Author: Elif Shafak
- Language: English
- Genre: Historical fiction
- Publisher: Viking Press
- Publication date: 2013
- Publication place: Turkey
- English publication date: 2013
- ISBN: 9780525427971

The Architect's Apprentice (Turkish: Ustam ve Ben, My Master and Me) is a 2013 historical fiction novel by Elif Shafak, set in the 16th century Ottoman Empire. Shafak originally wrote the novel in English and assisted its translation into Turkish. It follows the fictional life of Jahan, an elephant keeper to Sultan Suleiman the Magnificent who later becomes an apprentice of Mimar Sinan.

== Synopsis ==
The novel has an episodic structure. At the age of 12, Jahan flees his abusive stepfather by boat. He arrives in Istanbul with a young white elephant, a gift for the sultan from India. As part of the rogue captain's plan to steal from the palace, Jahan is led to pose as its mahout (keeper). Jahan looks after the elephant, whom he names Chota ("little"), at the palace menagerie.

Growing up, he befriends Mihrimah, the sultan's daughter. He falls in love with her, but has no prospect of marrying her due to his lower social status. He becomes an apprentice to Sinan, alongside three others: Davud, Nikola and Yusuf. He assists with a variety of projects, including the construction of mosques, bridges, waterworks and an observatory, and the restoration of the Hagia Sophia.

The book spans the reigns of Suleiman I, Selim II and Murad III. Other historical figures featured include Lütfi Pasha, Rüstem Pasha and Takiyüddin, and Jahan visits Michelangelo during a trip to Rome.

== Reception ==
The book received positive reviews in English-speaking media; The Guardian contrasted this with its "chilly reception" in Turkey. Reviewing it for the same newspaper, Anita Sethi called it an "intricate, multilayered new novel, which excels both in its resplendent details and grand design" and "emotionally forceful". In The New York Times, Christopher Atamian wrote that "Shafak unfurls what may be her most accomplished novel."

The novel was shortlisted for Royal Society of Literature's Ondaatje Prize in 2015.
