= 10 Minutes 38 Seconds in This Strange World =

2019 novel by Elif Shafak

- First edition cover (Turkey)
- Author: Elif Shafak
- Audio read by: Alix Dunmore
- Set in: Istanbul
- Publication date: 2019
- Media type: Print
- Pages: 311
- ISBN: 9780241293867
- Dewey Decimal: 23

10 Minutes 38 Seconds in This Strange World (Turkish: On Dakika Otuz Sekiz Saniye) is a 2019 novel by Turkish writer Elif Shafak and her eleventh overall. It is a one-woman story about a sex worker in Istanbul. It was released by Viking Press in 2019, and was shortlisted for the 2019 Booker Prize, and in 2020 for the Ondaatje Prize.

== Summary ==
10 Minutes and 38 Seconds in This Strange World opens in 1990 with "Tequila Leila", who is a prostitute. The story has her five outcast friends, who do not share a worthy importance in an illiberal country. Leila enters the state of awareness in her last moments, after she has been murdered and left in a dumpster outside Istanbul. "While the Turkish sun rises above her and her friends asleep soundly nearby, she contemplates her mortal existence before eternal rest." In the last minutes she recalls her previous life; "the taste of spiced goat stew, sacrificed by her father to celebrate the long-awaited birth of a son; the sight of bubbling vats of lemon and sugar which the women use to wax their legs while the men attend mosque; the scent of cardamom coffee that Leila shares with a handsome student in the brothel where she works. Each memory, too, recalls the friends she made at each key moment in her life—friends who are now desperately trying to find her..."

== Awards ==
- Shortlisted for the 2019 Booker Prize.
- The Blackwell's Book of the Year, 2019
- Shortlisted for RSL Ondaatje Prize, 2020
