= The Gaze (novel) =

1999 novel by Turkish writer Elif Şafak

First edition (Turkish)

The Gaze (Turkish title Mahrem) is a novel written by Turkish writer Elif Şafak. It was first published in Turkey in 1999. The novel won the Turkish Authors' Association 2000 prize for "best novel". An English translation was published in 2006 by Marion Boyars Publishers.

The novel consists of four separated, but coherent and interrelated parts that are split according to the place and the age where each independent story occurs. Each part may include different characters and narrator. The stories explore the philosophy of "gaze", in which characters may either gaze or become the subjects to be gazed and the fundamental differences between the perspectives of male and female.

== Characters ==
=== Istanbul – 1999 ===
- B-C – A dwarf who loves to gaze and be gazed by people. He is the lover of the narrator and they are often gazed upon because of their reversed physical appearances – an obese woman and a short man. He is addicted to writing the Dictionary of Gazes and uses the narrator as an object.
- The Narrator – Being an obese woman, the narrator cannot stay out of people's sight even for a moment. B-C is the only one who does not gaze at her. The moment when the narrator finds out that B-C is in fact a dwarf, she thinks that they are the same type of people, afraid of being the focus in crowd. Therefore, the narrator feels comfortable in front of B-C, and has an immediate crush on him.

=== Pera – 1885 ===
- Keramet Mumi Keske Memis Efendi – A man with slanted and narrow eyes. His creation allows him to gather as much people around him as he observes their reactions – the cherry colored tent.
- Sabel girl – The character whose story is introduced in Siberia-1648.
- La Belle Annabelle – The character whose story is introduced in France – 1868.

=== France – 1868 ===
- La Belle Annabelle: The most beautiful jinn of the poisonous yew forest and most beautiful creature in the world. She is the main actor in eastward cherry-colored tent.
- Madame de Marelle (Madeleine): La Belle Annabelle's mother. She falls in love with the young prince, and has an affair, which result to the birth of La Belle Annabelle. She refuses to take care of La Belle Annabelle since the day she was born.
- Monsieur de Marelle: La Belle Annabelle's father. He refuses to take care of Annabelle after he discovers the portray of the handsome man and is reminded of him when he sees Annabelle.
- Unnamed young man: A beautiful young man who could make any virgin fall for him. He becomes the object of Madame de Marelle's obsession who eventually has an affair with him. This results in the birth of La Belle Annabelle.
- Wet nurse: She was hired to take care of La Belle Annabelle. She falls in love with the baby. However, after she knows the truth that La Belle Annabelle is the product of Madam de Marelle's affair, she grows the distance between her and the beautiful baby. Despite that, she worries about La Belle Annabelle when La Belle Annabelle left the mansion.
- Troupe leader: He buys Annabelle from her family with the belief that she can bring wealth to his troupe. He gives her a name “La Belle Annabelle” and brings her to Istanbul to perform. However, his belief never come true which result him to sell La Belle Annabelle to Efendi.

== Plot ==
=== Istanbul – 1999 ===
Soon after B-C and the narrator meet, they become lovers and live together. The narrator thinks that the new place that she is living in is more comfortable and is even better than her own home that she used to share with her parents. Even though the narrator knows and feels that her parents love and care about her, she thinks that when she looks into their eyes, she sees the pain inside. She is different from others and she does not feel comfortable. Unfortunately, B-C decides to write a Dictionary of Gaze, and the narrator feels that she is being neglected while the Dictionary of the Gaze becomes the first thing in B-C's mind. Even though they live in the same house, they began to see less and less of each other as time pass by.

B-C encourages the narrator to go out cross-dressing. While they are outside, the narrator fights with a man for B-C under the gaze of a circled crowd. The next day, the narrator decides to go on a diet because she doesn't like to be constantly looked upon. She becomes increasingly anxious as B-C focuses on the Dictionary of Gazes every day and he sees everything as material. When she reads the Dictionary of Gazes she discovers one of the vocabularies.

sisko (fatty): She was so fat that wherever she went, people would stop whatever they were doing and stare at her. The way people looked at her made her so uncomfortable that she would eat even more and become even fatter. (P242 The Gaze)

The narrator feels pain as she realises she is just an object observed by B-C. She starts eating like crazy again. Then she rises to the air like a floating balloon, in the eyes of a lonely-child.

=== Pera – 1885 ===
The Pera narrative focuses on the character of Keramet Mumi Keske Memis Efendi. Efendi's birth causes his mother's death; he is born with a wax-like, featureless face. His aunt hurriedly "draws" him a face, but the wax hardens before his eyes could be completed. Efendi's wedding night is the turning point of his life; his beautiful but deaf and mute fiancée asks to leave due his expressionless eyes. Efendi observes his slanted eyes for the first time and remains in solitude for a long time.

One day, Efendi is inspired that he will to gather as many people as possible to ease the pain of loneliness by building the cherry-colored tent that will be remembered forever. The cherry-colored tent is an important set piece of the novel. Women come together in packs and enter the through the west door of the tent to see the ugliest being in the world, Sable-girl. Women leave the tent in fear and misery, as they are scared of what they see. Proving that women fear of being alone and seeing others who are uglier than them. Men come to the tent alone as ordered and enter through the east door of the tent to see the most beautiful girl, La Belle Annabelle. Efendi concludes through his observation that men fear most of not being loved and being seen weeping.

=== France – 1868 ===
Madame de Marelle finds a large locked box containing a portrait of a handsome young man who becomes the object of her obsession. A married woman, Madame de Marelle is tortured by her desire for another man. When he arrives at her mansion in the flesh, she gives him a job, but eventually gives herself to him.

She gives birth to twins; one is ugly and one is beautiful. She loves the ugly baby, but neglects the beautiful one because it reminds her of the young man. As she decides not to take care of the beautiful baby, her husband Monsieur de Marelle hires a wet nurse to take care of her. The wet nurse really loves the beautiful baby, but later, she was also told to take care of the ugly one as Madam de Marelle gave up taking care of him. Meanwhile, Monsieur de Marelle has an affair with the nurse.

After discovering the young man's portrait, Monsieur and the nurse abandon the beautiful girl in favor of the ugly boy. Nevertheless, the girl is so enchanted by her own appearance and her reflection on the surface of the water that she does not realize when the sun sets or when it is getting dark.

A theater company comes to the village and one of the members sees the beautiful girl Annabelle who is dangling her legs in the river. The leader of the troupe, recognizing that her beauty can bring wealth and success to the troupe, buys her from the family and gives her a name—La Belle Annabelle. They depart with the girl to Istanbul, where she will become the main attraction on the female side of Efendi's cherry-coloured tent.
