= There Are Rivers in the Sky =

2024 novel by Elif Shafak

- Author: Elif Shafak
- Language: English
- Genre: Historical fiction
- Publisher: Viking
- Publication date: 2024
- Pages: 464
- ISBN: 978-024-143-501-4

There Are Rivers in the Sky is a 2024 novel by Turkish writer Elif Shafak written originally in English and published by Viking. It was translated into Turkish by Omca A. Korugan, and published in 2025 by Doğan Kitap under the name Gökyüzünde Nehirler Var.

== Summary ==
The novel follows three characters: Arthur Smyth, an urchin in Victorian London who becomes a skilled Assyriologist; a Yazidi girl named Narin living in Turkey in 2014; and Zaleekhah Clarke, a hydrologist who lives on a houseboat in London in 2018. All three characters are connected by their interactions with a single drop of water.

== Reception ==
Mary Beard praised the book as "a brilliant, unforgettable novel, which raises big ideas of 'who owns the past' with nuance and complexity. Elif Shafak ties together diverse time periods and places in a way that seems both natural and wonderfully unexpected." Michael Donkor of The Guardian writes that while the book's plot and dialogue are unconvincing at points, “the spotlight on Yazidi culture, and the brutal persecution of this community, is the novel’s most unequivocal achievement.”

The novel was chosen as the Waterstones Fiction Book of the Month for April 2025, and won the Gordon Bowker Volcano Prize from the Society of Authors. It was also shortlisted for the Orwell Prize for Political Fiction in 2025.
