= Three Daughters of Eve =

2016 novel by Elif Safak

Three Daughters Of Eve
- First edition
- Author: Elif Safak
- Language: English
- Publisher: Bloomsbury USA
- Publication date: June 2016
- Publication place: Turkey
- Pages: 368
- ISBN: 9780241980699

Three Daughters of Eve is a 2016 novel by Turkish writer Elif Safak. In many places, the book was recalled and retitled Confused Quest. The book centres on a wealthy woman in her thirties, her childhood in Istanbul and her time as a student at Oxford University where she fell in love with a philosophy professor. It focuses on her categorizing her identity. The book was featured on several lists of "best books" in 2018.

== Summary ==
The book describes the present and past of Peri, who was born and raised in Turkey by her parents. She has two brothers who are quite dissimilar to her. Her parents are very different as her father never cared much about religion and her mother is a devout Muslim. Peri is confused when it comes to matters of religion. For this reason, while studying at Oxford University, she attends a lecture on God given by a professor of the campus, Azur. The book also provides a look into Peri’s teenage love life and its aftermath. In short, "Set in modern-day Istanbul, this riveting book follows Peri — married, wealthy, and on her way to a party. As her night unfolds, bringing with it a series of terrorist attacks, she finds herself lost in memories of the friends she made while studying at Oxford University, and the scandal that tore them apart."

== Plot ==
=== Istanbul (1980s–2016) ===
The book starts in Istanbul, Turkey, where Peri is with her daughter when she is robbed and is subject to an attempted rape. Her early childhood of the 1980s and home life are also discussed in the same city.

=== Oxford ===
In her late teenage years, Peri left to study at Oxford and met Professor Azur, who changed her life. Peri also meets two women at the campus: Mona, an Egyptian who is a true Muslim, and Shirin, who is a faithless Iranian. The book discusses these three characters, denoting them as the "Sinner", the "Believer" and the "Confused".

== Characters ==
=== Peri ===
Nazperi Nalbantoğlu is the main character of the book. She was brought up in Istanbul. She is married and has a pair of twins who are in their teenage years when the story is related. Peri is a person who is stuck between faith and doubt. "Islam, for her, was reminiscent of a childhood memory — so very familiar and personal but also somehow vague, far removed in time and space. Like a cube of sugar dissolved in her coffee, there and not there." The book discusses her past life; her childhood and her teenage years when she was in love with a professor while she was studying at Oxford, and her present life in Istanbul as a wealthy Turkish wife. She is the "Confused" one in the book.

=== Deniz ===
Deniz is the daughter of Peri. She is discussed in the opening scene when Peri is faced with a robbery, and several other times at different intervals in the book.

=== Azur ===
Professor Azur is a Philosophy lecturer at Oxford and a reputed personality on campus. He teaches a very unusual course on God. Peri later falls in love with him which completely overwhelms her. Her consequential actions contribute to him being later on expelled from the university.

=== Shirin ===
Shirin is Peri's friend who is considered to be the most one-dimensional character of the three. She is an Iranian girl who has no interest in the matter of religion. In the book she is denoted as the "Sinner".

=== Mona ===
Mona is a sincere Muslim. She wears a hijab and is a true feminist who belongs to Egypt. In the book she is called a "Believer".

== Themes ==
The story is about blending faith and uncertainty. According to Shafak, "The highest activity a human being can attain is learning for understanding, because to understand is to be free." She has shown her interest in matters of belief and uncertainty on religion as she said in an interview:

I am interested in the dance between belief and doubt. I am not a religious person in any sense. In reality, I do not like organized religions nor collective identities, but I am spiritual in my own way. I have respect for both faith and doubt. People like me - agnostics, heterodox mystics and humanists - are a minority in Turkey. But we exist and are able to challenge this duality between atheism and absolute religiousness.
