= Oya Baydar =

Turkish sociologist and writer (born 1940)

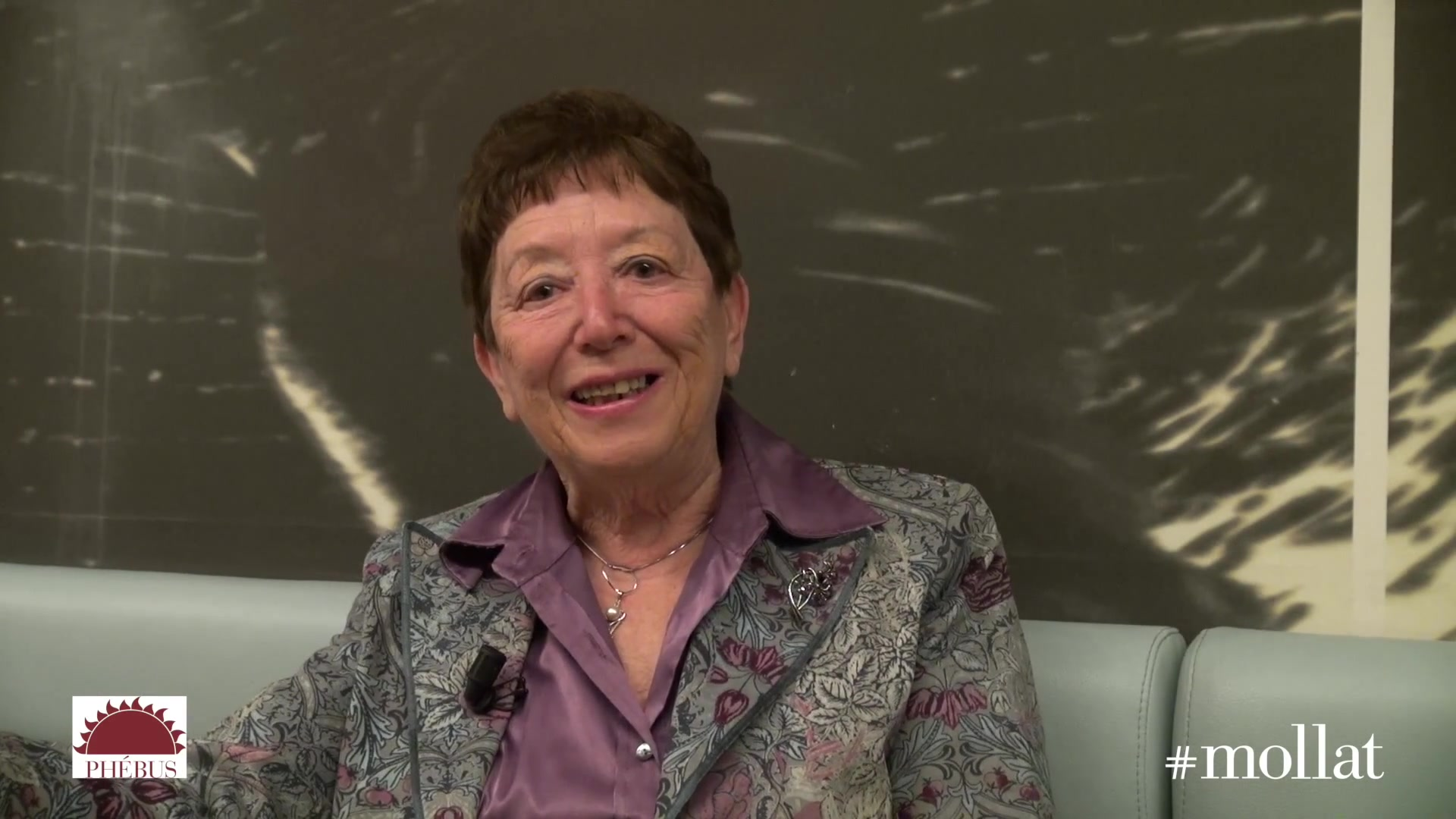
- Born: 1940 (age 85–86); Istanbul, Turkey
- Occupations: Novelist, story writer
- Website: oyabaydar.com

Oya Baydar (born 1940) is a Turkish sociologist and writer. For a long time she was involved in socialist politics.

== Early life and education ==
Oya Baydar was born in 1940. She studied at the Lycée Notre Dame de Sion Istanbul. She published her first novel, God Has Forgot Children, which was inspired by French writer Françoise Sagan, while still a student in high school. It was published both in the Hürriyet newspaper and as a book but its publication almost led to her expulsion. She then took a break from writing, interesting herself in politics for a long time, before returning to literature in later life.

Baydar graduated from Istanbul University's Department of Sociology in 1964 then entered the same department as an assistant. The Professors' Council of the University twice rejected her doctoral thesis on the rise of the labour force in Turkey but students occupied the University to protest against this in the first occupation of a university in Turkey. Baydar then became an assistant in Hacettepe University.

== Political life ==
During the military coup in 1971 Baydar was arrested because of her socialist activity as a member of the Workers Party of Turkey and the Teachers' Union of Turkey, and she left the University. Between 1972 and 1974, she worked as a columnist for the Yeni Ortam ([New Platform]) and Politika (Politics) newspapers .She produced her first journal with her husband Aydın Engin and Yusuf Ziya Bahadınlı. She was known as a socialist writer, researcher and activist.

During the 1980 military coup, Baydar went abroad. She remained in exile in Germany for twelve years, during which the German Democratic Republic ceased to exist as Germany was reunified. She wrote about this period in 1991 in her novel Farewell Alyosha.

Baydar supported the Yetmez Ama Evet ("Not Enough But Yes") campaign in the 2010 Turkish constitutional referendum in favor of AKP's proposals. She reported in February 2021 that her support to the campaign was a mistake.

== Later life ==
Oya Baydar returned to Turkey in 1992 and worked as editor for the Istanbul Encyclopedia (a combined project of the History Foundation and the Ministry of Culture), and as editor-in-chief for The Unionism Encyclopedia of Turkey. She has won many awards for the novels and stories she published after returning to Turkey, and has become a popular author. Since 2013, she has been writing for the online newspaper T24, particularly about the Kurdish problem (Kurdish–Turkish conflict (1978–present)). In 2016, her book on the problems in Diyarbakır was published as Surönü Diyalogları (Dialogues before Sur), the title referring to the ancient walled centre of Diyarbakır which is called Sur.

== Works ==
=== Novels ===
- Cat Letters (Kedi Mektupları), 1993
- Turning to Nowhere (Hiçbiryer’e Dönüş), 1998
- Hot Ashes Left (Sıcak Külleri Kaldı), 2000
- The Gate of Judas Tree (Erguvan Kapısı), 2004
- The Lost Word (Kayıp Söz), 2007
- The General of Garbage Heap (Çöplüğün Generali), 2009
- The age of war age of hope (Savaş Çağı Umut Çağı) (2010)
- That Wonderful Life of Yours ( O Muhteşem Hayatınız) (2012)

=== Stories ===
- Farewell Alyosha (Elveda Alyoşa), 1991

=== Others ===
- Family Albums of the Republic (Cumhuriyetin Aile Albümleri)
- From Villages to Cities in 75 Years (75 Yılda Köylerden Şehirlere)
- (75 Yılda Çarklardan Chip'lere)
- (75 Yılda Çarkları Döndürenler)
- Changing Life, Changing Person in 75 Years - Fashions of the Republic (75 Yılda Değişen Yaşam Değişen İnsan-Cumhuriyet Modaları)
- Fashions of the Republic (Cumhuriyet Modaları)
- The Unionism Encyclopedia of Turkey (Türkiye Sendikacılık Ansiklopedisi)
- Two Eras, Two Women ( İki Dönem İki Kadın)
- Dialogues before Sur (Surönü Diyalogları)

== Awards ==
- Sait Faik Short Story Award in 1991 (with Elveda Alyoşa)
- Yunus Nadi Novel Award in 1993 (with Kedi Mektupları)
- Orhan Kemal Novel Award in 2001 (with Sıcak Külleri Kaldı)
- Cevdet Kudret Literature Award in 2004 (with Erguvan Kapısı)
- Akdeniz Culture Award in 2011 (with Hiçbir Yere Dönüş (Back to Nowhere))
