= Oyinkan Braithwaite =

Nigerian-UK novelist and writer (born 1988)

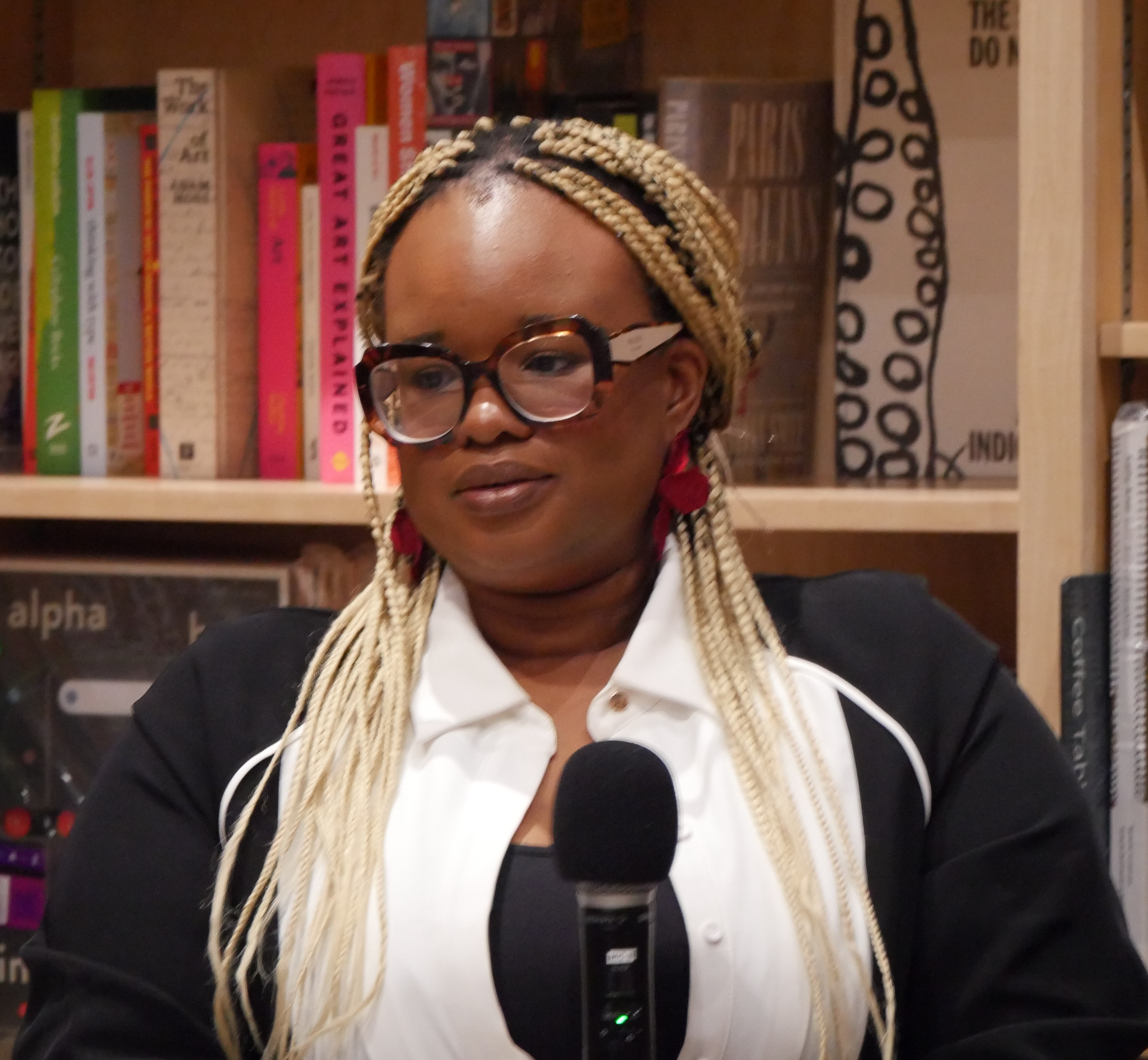
- Born: 1988 (age 37–38); Lagos, Nigeria
- Education: Kingston University; University of Surrey; Iowa Writers' Workshop
- Occupations: Novelist, author
- Writing career
- Period: 2010–present
- Notable work: My Sister, the Serial Killer (2018)

Oyinkan Braithwaite (born 1988) is a Nigerian-British novelist and writer. She was born in Lagos and spent her childhood in both Nigeria and the United Kingdom. Braithwaite is best known for her 2018 debut novel, My Sister, the Serial Killer.

== Life ==
Braithwaite was born in Lagos, Nigeria, in 1988. She spent most of her childhood in the UK after her family moved to Southgate, London. She had her primary-school education in London then returned to Lagos when her brother was born in 2001. She studied law and creative writing at the University of Surrey and Kingston University, before moving back to Lagos in 2012.

She has worked as an assistant editor in publishing house Kachifo Limited and as a production manager at Ajapa World, an education and entertainment company.

== Career ==
Braithwaite's debut book, My Sister, the Serial Killer, was published by Doubleday Books in 2018 to wide acclaim. Her short stories have appeared in McSweeney's, WePresent, and Amazon Original Stories' Hush Collection.

Braithwaite is also an illustrator, and illustrated the cover of the Nigerian edition of her novel, which was published by Narrative Landscape Publishers.

Her 2025 novel, Cursed Daughters, had a "very different foundation than the thriller My Sister, the Serial Killer, which Braithwaite admits she was eager to get 'as far away from' as she could, according to an interview with Elle.

== Awards and nominations ==
- 2014: Shortlisted as a top ten spoken-word artist in the Eko Poetry Slam
- 2016: Nominated for the Commonwealth Short Story prize
- 2019: Winner of the LA Times Award for Best Crime Thriller in 2019
- 2019: Shortlisted for the Women's Prize for Fiction in 2019
- 2019: Longlisted for the Booker Prize in 2019
- 2019: Shortlisted for the 2019 Amazon Publishing Readers’ Awards
- 2020: Winner of the 2020 Crime and Thriller Book of the Year in the British Book Awards
- 2020: Shortlisted for the 2020 Theakston's Old Peculier Crime Novel of the Year Award
- 2026: Winner of the 2026 British Book Award for Audiobook Fiction of the Year
- 2026: Cursed Daughters was a finalist for Ignyte Award for Outstanding Novel – Adult.

== Bibliography ==
=== Novels ===
- My Sister, the Serial Killer (2018, ISBN 9781786495983)
- The Baby is Mine (2021, ISBN 9781838952563)
- Cursed Daughters (2025, ISBN 9781805463368)

=== Others ===
- The Twisted Women's Club (2025)
- The Perfect Crime (2022)
- McSweeny's 59 (2020)
- Homeless Bodies and Other Stories (2019)

=== Collections of short stories ===
- The Driver (2010)
- Treasure (2020)

=== Critical studies and reviews of Braithwaite's work ===
- Chow-Quesada, Emily (Fall 2024). "The detectives who kill : Black female detectives in the work of Oyinkan Braithwaite and Nnedi Okorafor". Clues. 42 (2): 98–109.
