= Léo Gilson Ribeiro =

- Léo Gilson Marcondes Ribeiro
- Born: 26 January 1928; Varginha, Brazil.
- Died: 11 January 2007 (aged 78); São Paulo, Brazil.
- Citizenship: Brazil
- Education: University of California, University of Hamburg
- Occupations: Journalist; essayist; playwright; translator; critic
- Awards: Jabuti Prize (1968)
- Website: https://leogilsonribeiro.com.br

Léo Gilson Ribeiro (Varginha, January 26, 1928 – São Paulo, January 11, 2007) was a Brazilian journalist, essayist, playwright, translator and critic.

In 1958, Ribeiro defended her PhD dissertation named "Die Saudade als Form des Pantheismus, veranschaulicht am Werke von Teixeira de Pascoais" (in English: "Saudade as a form of pantheism, illustrated by the work of Teixeira de Pascoais") at University of Hamburg (Germany).

In according George Monteiro, he "was well-informed in American literary matters, having spent some time in the United States working as a journalist-scholar" (Ribeiro hold a degree at University of California) and continue to states that Ribeiro published a "sprightly and informative essay" named “Brazil: Between Dogpatch and Yoknapatawpha” in The Kenyon Review in 1961.

In Brazil, Ribeiro was translator of Tennessee Williams and Steven Berkoff's works.

== Awards ==
He was awarded with Jabuti Prize of 1968 in Critics category, and the ExxonMobil Journalism Award (Prêmio Esso de Jornalismo) of 1969.

== Thoughts ==
=== Criticism against stereotypes on Latin-American literature ===
Ribeiro was a strong critic of the superficial and prejudiced way in which the publishing market treated the works of Latin American authors, including Brazilians. In a letter sent by Stefan Congrat-Butlar to the editor of Publishers Weekly, he cited Léo Gilson Ribeiro's harsh criticism of Harriet de Onís's translation of Guimarães Rosa, which he claimed was viciousness, and then presented Ribeiro's demand that American publishers stop hiring translators of Brazilian books by “the first person who comes around claiming he/she knows Brazil and its capital, Buenos Aires.” (a "Gringo" stereotype among Brazilians to refer to the stance of first-world foreigners who seek to interfere in the country or even give their opinion on it, but are completely unaware of the Brazilian reality, confusing it with that of neighboring countries.).

== Selected works ==
Léo Gilson Ribeiro's main works are:

- 1958 - "Die Saudade als Form des Pantheismus, veranschaulicht am Werke von Teixeira de Pascoais" (in German);
- 1961 - "Brazil: Between Dogpatch and Yoknapatawpha" in The Kenyon Review (in English);
- 1964 - "Crônicas do Absurdo: Kafka, Büchner, Brecht, Ionesco" (in Portuguese);
- 1966 - "A balada de Manhattan: uma elegia contemporânea" (in Portuguese);
- 1988 - "O Continente Submerso: perfis e depoimentos de grandes escritores de "nuestra" América" (in Portuguese).
