= Selçuk Altun =

Turkish writer

- Born: 1950 (age 75–76); Artvin, Turkey
- Occupation: Writer
- Writing career
- Period: 2001-Present
- Genre: Crime

Selçuk Altun (born 1950) is a Turkish writer, publisher and retired banking executive.

== Biography ==
Born in Artvin, Turkey, in 1950, he graduated from the Management Department of Boğaziçi University. He began work in the finance sector in 1974 and was chairman of Yapi Kredi Bank, chairman of one of the Turkey's largest Internet company Superonline from its inception in 1994 and executive board director of the YKY (Yapı Kredi Publications), where he amassed a personal library of 9,000 volumes and published works by Louise Gluck and John Ashbery, before he retired in 2004 to pursue his writing career full-time.

“My goal was to write a book by the age of 50”, he says. “Before that, I knew I needed to read, so I read some 4,000 books before I sat down to write. That, more than anything, gave me the confidence I needed.” His first novel Yalnızlık Gittiğin Yoldan Gelir (Loneliness Comes from the Road You Go Down) was published in 2001 and has been subsequently followed by four further novels, a book of essays and a regular monthly column titled Kitap Icin (For The Love Of Books) in the Cumhuriyet.

“I regard myself as a ‘person who writes’ rather than a ‘writer,’” the author told Today's Zaman, “I do not make a living on what I receive from my books. I transfer all royalties from my books to a scholarship fund I've founded at the university I graduated from. It provides scholarships to successful university students who study literature.” “In any case, Whenever I want to write, I feel the urge to read first.”

“I believe that in both Turkish and world literature, bibliophilic protagonists and narrators in particular do not appear as much as they should,” states the self-confessed bibliophile, who maintains he reads far more than he writes, “Besides, these characters do not like showing up in trashy novels that sweep the book market. Yet I believe the elite group called ‘literary readers’ do embrace them.” “In my novels, the setting is as important as the central characters. For this reason, I go on special voyages. These voyages nurture me; each time, I set on the road wondering how that particular voyage will nurture me.”

In order to bring his books to an international audience, the author himself paid for the English translation of his fourth novel Songs My Mother Never Taught Me. This translation, by Ruth Christie and Selçuk Berilgen, was published Telegram Books in 2008 and sold 3,000 copies in the UK, but while the English publisher opted to follow it with Many and Many a Year Ago in 2009 and various German, Swiss, Spanish and Portuguese houses have expressed an interest in buying rights, “the global economic crisis seems to have stopped the process”, and, “Three foreign publishing houses acquired the rights to publish Songs My Mother Never Taught Me, but that was it!”

“There are many reasons for the limited number of Turkish authors and poets translated into English,” Altun stated in an interview with The Guardian, “Sadly Nobel prize-winner Orhan Pamuk's success hasn't yet increased Anglo-American interest in Turkish authors and poets,” before going on to list works by Feyyaz Kayacan Fergar, Oktay Rifat, Yaşar Kemal, Sait Faik, Bilge Karasu, Ahmet Hamdi Tanpınar, Nazım Hikmet as well as Pamuk among his top 10 Turkish books.

== English language bibliography ==
Four of Altun's novels have been published in English translation.

=== Songs My Mother Never Taught Me ===
Songs My Mother Never Taught Me (Turkish title: Annemin Öğretmediği Şarkılar) is a 2007 crime novel by Turkish writer Selçuk Altun republished in 2008 by Telegram Books in English translation by Ruth Christie and Selçuk Berilgen.

==== Editions ====
- Songs My Mother Never Taught Me. trans. Ruth Christie & Selçuk Berilgen. London: Telegram Books. 2008. ISBN 978-1-84659-053-5.

=== Many and Many a Year Ago ===
Many and Many a Year Ago (Turkish title: Senelerce Senelerce Evveldi) is a 2008 novel by Turkish writer Selçuk Altun republished in 2009 by Telegram Books in English translation by Clifford and Selhan Endres.

==== Editions ====
- Many and Many a Year Ago. trans. Clifford & Selhan Endres. London: Telegram Books. 2009. ISBN 978-1-84659-067-2.

=== The Sultan of Byzantium ===
The Sultan of Byzantium is a 2011 drama mystery novel by Altun; a 2012 English translation by Clifford Endres and Selhan Endres was published in London by Telegram. This novel has been translated into Urdu by Huma Anwar.

=== Farewell Fountain Street ===
Farewell Fountain Street is a 2021 historical mystery novel by Altun; published in London by Telegram.
