= Elif Shafak =

Turkish novelist, essayist and women's rights activist (born 1971)

Elif Shafak FRSL
- Elif Şafak
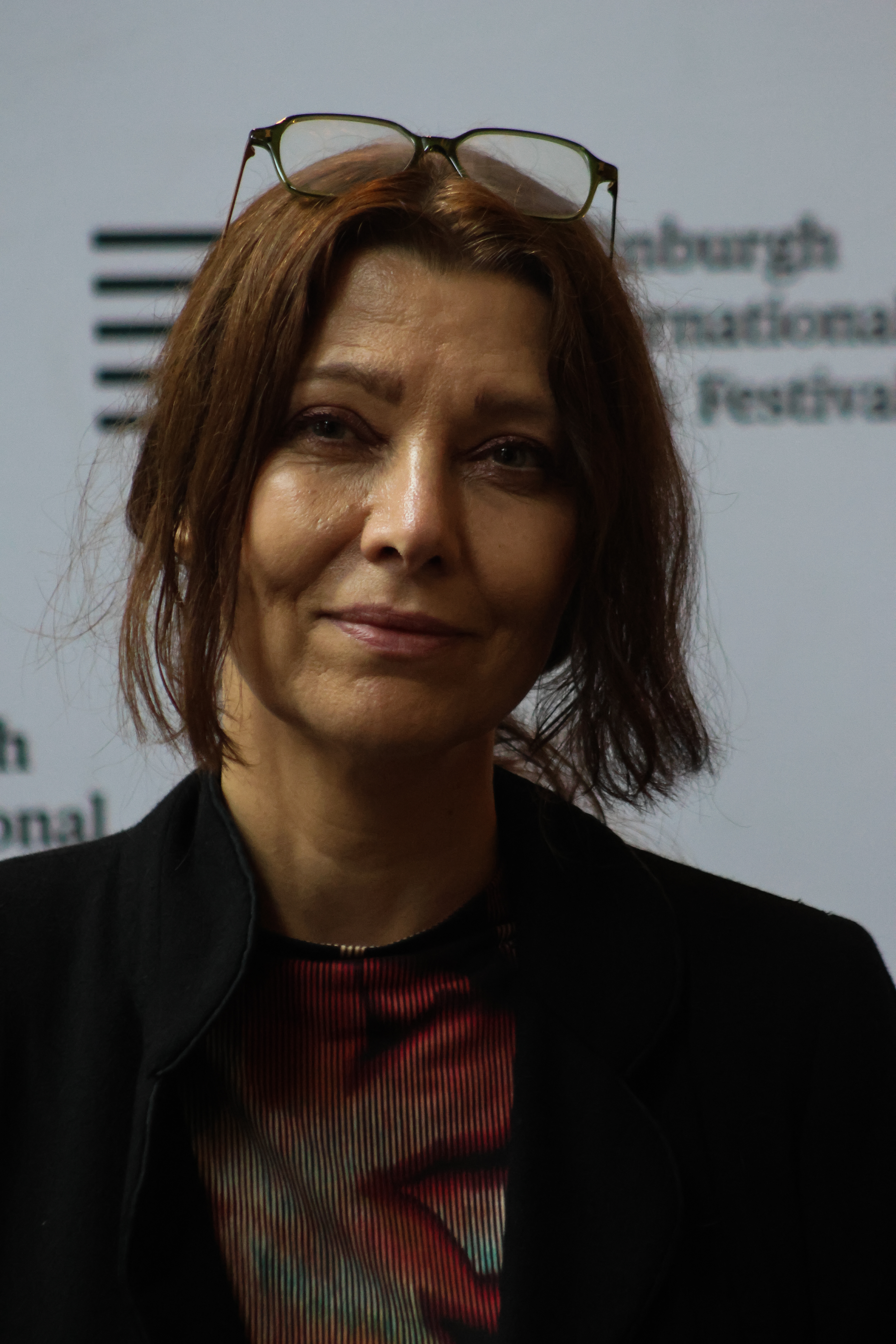
- Shafak at the Edinburgh Book Festival 2026
- Born: Elif Bilgin; 25 October 1971 (age 55); Strasbourg, France
- Education: Middle East Technical University
- Occupations: Novelist; essayist; public speaker; activist
- Writing career
- Language: English; Turkish; Spanish
- Period: 1990s–present
- Genre: Literary fiction
- Notable works: Three Daughters of Eve; The Gaze; The Bastard of Istanbul; The Forty Rules of Love; Honour; 10 Minutes 38 Seconds in This Strange World
- Website: www.elifshafak.com

Elif Shafak (Turkish: Elif Şafak [eˈlif ʃaˈfak]; née Bilgin; born 25 October 1971) is a Turkish-British novelist, essayist, public speaker, political scientist, and activist.

Shafak (Note: Her name is spelled "Shafak" (with the digraph ⟨Sh⟩ in place of the ⟨Ş⟩) on her books published in English, including the Penguin Books edition of The Forty Rules of Love.) writes in Turkish and English, and has published 21 books. She is best known for her novels, which include The Bastard of Istanbul, The Forty Rules of Love, Three Daughters of Eve, 10 Minutes 38 Seconds in This Strange World, and The Island of Missing Trees. As of 2025, her work had been translated into almost sixty languages, and nominated for several literary awards. She has been described by the Financial Times as "Turkey's leading female novelist", with several of her works having been bestsellers in Turkey and internationally.

Her works have prominently featured the city of Istanbul, and dealt with themes of Eastern and Western culture, roles of women in society, and human rights issues. Certain politically challenging topics addressed in her novels, such as child abuse and the Armenian genocide, have led to legal action from authorities in Turkey that prompted her to emigrate to the United Kingdom.

Shafak has a PhD in political science. An essayist and contributor to several media outlets, Shafak has advocated for women's rights, minority rights, and freedom of speech. In December 2025, she was named as the new president of the Royal Society of Literature, taking over the role from Bernardine Evaristo, and in 2026 she was awarded the Helena Vaz da Silva European Award for Raising Public Awareness on Cultural Heritage by Europa Nostra and the Centro Nacional de Cultura in Portugal.

== Early life and education ==
Shafak was born in Strasbourg, France, to Nuri Bilgin, a professor of Social Psychology, and Şafak Atayman, who later became a diplomat. After her parents separated, Shafak returned to Ankara, Turkey, where she was raised by her mother and maternal grandmother. She says that growing up in a dysfunctional family was difficult, but that growing up in a non-patriarchal environment had a beneficial impact on her. Having grown up without her father, she met her half-brothers for the first time when she was in her mid-twenties.

Shafak added her mother's first name, Turkish for "dawn", to her own when constructing her pen name at the age of eighteen. Shafak spent her teenage years in Madrid, Jordan and Germany.

Shafak studied an undergraduate degree in international relations at Middle East Technical University, and earned a master's degree in women's studies. She holds a PhD in political science. She has taught at universities in Turkey. Later emigrating to the United States, she was a fellow at Mount Holyoke College, a visiting professor at the University of Michigan, and was a tenured professor at the University of Arizona in Near Eastern studies.

In the UK, for the 2017–2018 academic year, she held the Weidenfeld Visiting Professorship in Comparative European Literature at St Anne's College, University of Oxford, where she is an honorary fellow. The governing body of Hertford College, Oxford, elected her as a visiting fellow in 2024.

== Career ==
Shafak has published 21 books, fiction and nonfiction.

=== Fiction ===
Shafak's first novel, Pinhan, was awarded the Rumi Prize in 1998, a Turkish literary prize.

Shafak's 1999 novel Mahrem (The Gaze) was awarded "Best Novel" by the Turkish Authors' Association in 2000.

Her next novel, Bit Palas (The Flea Palace, 2002), was shortlisted for The Independent Foreign Fiction Prize in 2005. After 22 years, in January 2024 Shafak was found guilty of plagiarism in her book Bit Palas in Turkey. However, 130 prominent figures from the literary world came together to issue a statement emphasising that this was not a real case. Both Shafak and her publisher in Turkey have appealed the decision.

Shafak released her first novel in English, The Saint of Incipient Insanities, in 2004.

Her second novel in English, The Bastard of Istanbul, was long-listed for the Orange Prize. It addresses the Armenian genocide, which is denied by the Turkish government. Shafak was prosecuted in July 2006 on charges of "insulting Turkishness" (Article 301 of the Turkish Penal Code) for discussing the genocide in the novel. Had she been convicted, she would have faced a maximum prison sentence of three years. The Guardian commented that The Bastard of Istanbul may be the first Turkish novel to address the genocide. She was acquitted of these charges in September 2006 at the prosecutor's request.

Shafak's novel The Forty Rules of Love (Aşk in Turkish) became a bestseller in Turkey upon its release; it sold more than 200,000 copies by 2009, surpassing a previous record of 120,000 copies set by Orhan Pamuk's The New Life (1994). In France, Shafak's novel was awarded a Prix ALEF* – Mention Spéciale Littérature Etrangère. It was also nominated for the 2012 International IMPAC Dublin Literary Award. In 2019, it was listed by the BBC as one of the 100 "most inspiring" novels and one of the "100 novels that shaped our world".

Her 2012 novel Honour, which focuses on an honour killing, was nominated for the 2012 Man Asian Literary Prize and 2013 Women's Prize for Fiction, followed by The Architect's Apprentice, a historical fiction novel about a fictional apprentice to Mimar Sinan, in 2014.

Shafak's novel Three Daughters of Eve (2017), set in Istanbul and Oxford from the 1980s to the present day, was chosen by London Mayor Sadiq Khan as his favourite book of the year. American writer Siri Hustvedt also praised the book. The book explores themes of secular versus orthodox religious practice, conservative versus liberal politics and modern Turkish attitudes towards these .

Following Margaret Atwood, David Mitchell and Sjon, Shafak was selected as the 2017 writer for Future Library. Her work The Last Taboo is the fourth part of a collection of 100 literary works that will not be published until 2114.

Shafak's 2019 novel 10 Minutes 38 Seconds in This Strange World, revolving around the life of an Istanbul sex worker, was shortlisted for the Booker Prize. In 2019, Shafak was investigated by Turkish prosecutors for addressing child abuse and sexual violence in her fiction writing but this didn't result in the prosecution.

Shafak released her twelfth novel The Island of Missing Trees in 2021.

Her 2024 novel is There are Rivers in the Sky, a split-timeline novel about water, that reaches from the Assyrian king Ashurbanipal to a hydrologist in present-day London and addresses the persecution, and 2014 massacre, of the Yazidi.

=== Non-fiction ===
Shafak's non-fiction essays in Turkish have been collected in four books: Med-Cezir (2005), Firarperest (2010), Şemspare (2012) and Sanma ki Yalnızsın (2017).

In 2020, Shafak published How to Stay Sane in an Age of Division.

=== In the media ===
Shafak has written for Time, The Guardian, La Repubblica, The New Yorker, The New York Times, Der Spiegel and New Statesman.

Shafak has been a panellist or commentator on BBC World, Euronews and Al Jazeera English.

Until 2009, when she transferred to Habertürk, Shafak was a writer for the newspaper Zaman, which was known for its affiliation with Fethullah Gülen.

In July 2017, Elif Shafak was chosen as a "castaway" on BBC Radio 4's Desert Island Discs.

Shafak has been a TEDGlobal speaker twice receiving standing ovation.

== Themes ==
=== Istanbul ===
Istanbul has been prominent in Shafak's writing. She depicts the city as a melting pot of different cultures and various contradictions. Shafak has remarked: "Istanbul makes one comprehend, perhaps not intellectually but intuitively, that East and West are ultimately imaginary concepts, and can thereby be de-imagined and re-imagined." In the same essay written for Time magazine Shafak says: "East and West is no water and oil. They do mix. And in a city like Istanbul they mix intensely, incessantly, amazingly." The New York Times Book Review said of Shafak, "she has a particular genius for depicting backstreet Istanbul, where the myriad cultures of the Ottoman Empire are still in tangled evidence on every family tree."

In a piece she wrote for the BBC, Shafak said, "Istanbul is like a huge, colourful Matrushka – you open it and find another doll inside. You open that, only to see a new doll nesting. It is a hall of mirrors where nothing is quite what it seems. One should be cautious when using categories to talk about Istanbul. If there is one thing the city doesn't like, it is clichés."

=== Eastern and Western cultures ===
Shafak blends Eastern and Western ways of storytelling, and draws on oral and written culture. In The Washington Post, Ron Charles Wrote: "Shafak speaks in a multivalent voice that captures the roiling tides of diverse cultures." Mysticism and specifically Sufism has also been a theme in her work, particularly in The Forty Rules of Love. Her writing on the theme of European culture and heritage won her the 2026 Helena Vaz da Silva Award for Raising Public Awareness on Cultural Heritage, with the Award Jury saying that "Eli Shafak's writings bring to life the richness and complexity of our cultural memory and identity, connecting in a most imaginative way our past, present and future."

=== Feminism ===
A feminist and advocate for gender equality, Shafak's writing has addressed numerous feminist issues and the role of women in society. Examples include motherhood and violence against women. In an interview with William Skidelsky for The Guardian, she said: "In Turkey, men write and women read. I want to see this change."

=== Human rights ===
Shafak's novels have explored human rights issues, particularly those in Turkey. She has said: "What literature tries to do is to re-humanize people who have been dehumanized ... People whose voices we never hear. That's a big part of my work". Specific topics have included persecution of Yazidis, the Armenian genocide and the treatment of various minorities in Turkey.

== Views ==
=== Freedom of speech ===
Shafak is an advocate for freedom of expression. While taking part in the Free Speech Debate, she commented: "I am more interested in showing the things we have in common as fellow human beings, sharing the same planet and ultimately, the same sorrows and joys rather than adding yet another brick in the imaginary walls erected between cultures/religions/ethnicities."

=== Political views ===
Shafak has been critical of the presidency of Recep Tayyip Erdoğan, describing his tenure as leading to increased authoritarianism in Turkey. She signed an open letter in protest against Turkey's Twitter ban in 2014, commenting: "the very core of democracy ... is lacking in today's Turkey".

Shafak has spoken and written about various global political trends. In the 2010s, she drew parallels between Turkish political history and political developments in Europe and the United States. Writing in The New Yorker in 2016, she said "Wave after wave of nationalism, isolationism, and tribalism have hit the shores of countries across Europe, and they have reached the United States. Jingoism and xenophobia are on the rise. It is an Age of Angst—and it is a short step from angst to anger and from anger to aggression."

Shafak signed an open letter in protest against Russian persecution of homosexuals and blasphemy laws before Sochi 2014.

== Personal life ==
Shafak had lived in Istanbul, and in the United States before moving to the UK. Shafak has lived in London since 2013, but speaks of "carrying Istanbul in her soul". As of 2019, Shafak had been in self-imposed exile from Turkey due to fear of prosecution.

Shafak is married to the Turkish journalist Eyüp Can Sağlık, a former editor of the liberal newspaper Radikal, with whom she has a daughter and a son. In 2017, Shafak came out as bisexual.

Following the birth of her daughter in 2006, Shafak suffered from postnatal depression, a period she addressed in her memoir Black Milk.

== Awards and recognition ==
=== Book awards ===
- 1998: Pinhan, The Great Rumi Award, Turkey.
- 2000: The Gaze, Union of Turkish Writers' Best Novel Prize. and
- 2005: The Flea Palace, shortlisted for Independent Foreign Fiction Prize, United Kingdom.
- 2011: Soufi, mon amour (Phébus, 2011), Prix ALEF – Mention Spéciale Littérature Etrangère.
- 2012: The Forty Rules of Love, nominated for the International IMPAC Dublin Literary Award.
- 2013: Crime d'honneur (Phébus, 2013), Prix Relay des voyageurs.
- 2014: Honour, second place for the Prix Escapade, France.
- 2015: The Architect's Apprentice, shortlisted for RSL Ondaatje Prize.
- 2019: 10 Minutes 38 Seconds in This Strange World, shortlisted for the Booker Prize.
- 2020: 10 Minutes 38 Seconds in This Strange World, shortlisted for Ondaatje Prize.
- 2021: The Island of Missing Trees, shortlisted for the Costa Book Award.
- 2021: Halldór Laxness International Literature Prize.
- 2011: The Island of Missing Trees, shortlisted for the Women's Prize for Fiction.
- 2022: The Island of Missing Trees, shortlisted for the Edward Stanford Travel Writing Awards.
- 2023: The Island of Missing Trees, shortlisted for the British Book Awards.
- 2025: There Are Rivers in The Sky, Fiction with a Sense of Place Award at the Edward Stanford Travel Writing Awards.
- 2025: There Are Rivers in The Sky, Gordon Bowker Volcano Prize from the Society of Authors.
- 2025: There Are Rivers in The Sky, Prix Femina Etranger finalist.
- 2026: There Are Rivers in The Sky, translated by Dominique Goy-Blanquet into French (Éditions Flammarion), Prix Fragonard de Littérature Étrangère.
- 2026: There Are Rivers in The Sky, translated by Dominique Goy-Blanquet into French (Éditions Flammarion), Le Prix du Livre Lorientales.

=== Other recognition ===
- Maria Grazia Cutuli Award – International Journalism Prize, Italy 2006.
- Turkish Journalists and Writers Foundation "The Art of Coexistence Award, 2009".
- Marka Conference 2010 Award.
- Women To Watch Award, Mediacat & Advertising Age, March 2014.
- Asian Women of Achievement Awards 2015: Global Empowerment Award.
- 2016 GTF Awards for Excellence in Promoting Gender Equality.
- Elected Fellow of the Royal Society of Literature (FRSL), 2019.
- BBC's 100 most inspiring and influential women, 2021.
- British Academy President's Medal, 2024.
- Speaking at the launch of the Frankfurt International Book Fair, 2024.
- Helena Vaz da Silva European Award for Raising Public Awareness on Cultural Heritage, 2026

== Bibliography ==
Turkish				English			
Title	Year	Publisher	ISBN	Title	Year	Publisher	ISBN
Kem Gözlere Anadolu	1994	Evrensel	9789757837299				
Pinhan	1997	Metis	975-342-297-0				
Şehrin Aynaları	1999	Metis	975-342-298-9				
Mahrem	2000	Metis	975-342-285-7	The Gaze	2006	Marion Boyars Publishers Ltd	978-0714531212
Bit Palas	2002	Metis	975-342-354-3	The Flea Palace	2007	Marion Boyars Publishers Ltd	978 0714531205
Araf	2004	Metis	978-975-342-465-3	The Saint of Incipient Insanities	2004	Farrar, Straus and Giroux	0-374-25357-9
Beşpeşe (with Murathan Mungan, Faruk Ulay, Celil Oker and Pınar Kür)	2004	Metis	975-342-467-1				
Med-Cezir	2005	Metis	975-342-533-3				
Baba ve Piç	2006	Metis	978-975-342-553-7	The Bastard of Istanbul	2007	Viking	0-670-03834-2
Siyah Süt	2007	Doğan	975-991-531-6	Black Milk: On Writing, Motherhood, and the Harem Within	2011	Viking	0-670-02264-0
Aşk	2009	Doğan	978-605-111-107-0	The Forty Rules of Love: A Novel of Rumi	2010	Viking	0-670-02145-8
Kâğıt Helva	2010	Doğan	978-605-111-426-2				
Firarperest	2010	Doğan	978-605-111-902-1				
				The Happiness of Blond People: A Personal Meditation on the Dangers of Identity	2011	Penguin	9780670921768
İskender	2011	Doğan	978-605-090-251-8	Honour	2012	Viking	0-670-92115-7
Şemspare	2012	Doğan	978-605-090-799-5				
Ustam ve Ben	2013	Doğan	978-605-09-1803-8	The Architect's Apprentice	2014	Viking	978-024-100-491-3
Sakız Sardunya	2014	Doğan	978-605-09-2291-2				
Havva'nın Üç Kızı	2016	Doğan	978-605-09-3537-0	Three Daughters of Eve	2016	Viking	978-024-128-804-7
Sanma ki Yalnızsın	2018	Doğan	978-605-095-146-2				
On Dakika Otuz Sekiz Saniye	2019	Doğan	978-605-096-309-0	10 Minutes 38 Seconds in This Strange World	2019	Viking	978-024-129-386-7
Aşkın Kırk Kuralı (compilation based on Aşk)	2019	Doğan Novus	978-605-095-864-5				
Bölünmüş Bir Dünyada Akıl Sağlığımızı Nasıl Koruruz	2022	Doğan	978-625-821-547-2	How to Stay Sane in an Age of Division	2020	Welcome Collection / Profile Books	978-178-816-572-3
Kayıp Ağaçlar Adası	2023	Doğan	978-625-684-315-8	The Island of Missing Trees	2021	Viking	978-024-143-499-4
Gökyüzünde Nehirler Var	2025	Doğan		There Are Rivers in the Sky	2024	Viking	978-024-143-501-4
				In One Brief Moment All Eternity	2026	Viking	978-0-241-74546-5

Novel
Essay / Anthology
Autobiography
Children's book
Short story

NOTE: Marion Boyars Publishers Ltd was bought out by Viking in 2011.
