= Ruth Christie =

Ruth Christie CM OM is an Indigenous Canadian elder and scholar.

Raised at Loon Straits, Manitoba, Christie trained as a licensed practical nurse at Saint Boniface Hospital, graduating in 1960. She later worked as a teacher in Loon Straits, as an activity coordinator at a personal care home, a historical interpreter at Lower Fort Garry (portraying her own ancestor), a storyteller at the Manitoba Museum, and an elder.

Christie was named to the Order of Manitoba "for her dedication to the preservation of Indigenous history, education and community service". In 2022 she was named a Member of the Order of Canada "for her contributions to Indigenous history in Manitoba, and her mentorship as a storyteller and knowledge keeper". She received the Queen's Golden Jubilee Medal and an honorary Doctor of Laws from the University of Winnipeg.
