= Eleven to Fly =

Studio album by Tin Tin Out
- Released: 15 November 1999
- Recorded: 1998–1999
- Studio: Innovation Studios, Sarm East Studios, Strongroom Studios (London, England)
- Genre: Electronica; trip hop; house; pop rock
- Length: 57:31
- Label: Virgin; VC
- Producer: Tin Tin Out; Shelley Nelson

Tin Tin Out chronology
Always (1998)	Eleven to Fly (1999)

Singles from Eleven to Fly
- 1. "Here's Where the Story Ends" Released: 16 March 1998; 2. "Sometimes" Released: 31 August 1998; 3. "Eleven to Fly" Released: 30 August 1999; 4. "What I Am" Released: 1 November 1999; 5. "Anybody's Guess" Released: 2000

Eleven to Fly is the third studio album by English electronic music duo Tin Tin Out. It was released on 15 November 1999 by Virgin Records and VC Recordings.

== Singles ==
The album includes four singles which reached the top 40 of the UK Singles Chart: a cover of The Sundays' "Here's Where the Story Ends", featuring vocals by Shelley Nelson, peaked at number seven in early 1998, "Sometimes", also featuring Nelson on vocals, reached number 20 in the same year (on the album as an acoustic version), the title track "Eleven to Fly", with vocals by Wendy Page, reached number 26 a year later in 1999, and a cover of Edie Brickell & New Bohemians' "What I Am", featuring Emma Bunton from the Spice Girls, reached number two towards the end of 1999.

== Track listing ==
All tracks are written by Darren Stokes, Lindsay Edwards and Wendy Page, except where noted

No.	Title	Writer(s)	Length
1.	"Anywhere" (featuring Natasha Brice)	Darren Stokes; Lindsay Edwards; Giorgio Moroder; Natasha Brice	3:33
2.	"Eleven to Fly" (featuring Wendy Page)		4:18
3.	"Here's Where the Story Ends" (featuring Shelley Nelson)	David Gavurin; Harriet Wheeler	3:33
4.	"Language of Fingers" (featuring Wendy Page)		5:54
5.	"Anybody's Guess" (featuring Wendy Page)		4:30
6.	"Tell Me Your Reasons" (featuring Wendy Page)		4:50
7.	"Numb" (featuring Wendy Page)		4:57
8.	"Weird (Save Yourself)" (featuring Wendy Page)		5:49
9.	"What I Am" (featuring Emma Bunton)	Edie Brickell; Kenny Withrow	6:12
10.	"All I Need" (featuring Wendy Page)		7:31
11.	"Sometimes" (acoustic version) (featuring Shelley Nelson)	Stokes; Edwards; Shelley Nelson	3:52
Total length:			57:31

== Charts ==
Chart (1999)	Peak position
UK Albums (OCC)	187
