= She (song) =

Songs titled "She" include:

- "She" (Charles Aznavour song), 1974, covered by Elvis Costello in the film Notting Hill
- "She" (Green Day song), 1994
- "She" (Groove Coverage song), 2004
- "She" (Kiss song), 1975
- "She" (Jelly Roll song), 2023
- "She" (Tommy James and the Shondells song), 1970, from Travelin'
- "She" (Tyler, the Creator song), 2011
- "She" (Zayn song), 2016
- "She" (Selena Gomez song), 2020
- "She", by Dodie Clark from the EP Human, 2019
- "She", by Edie Brickell from the album Shooting Rubberbands at the Stars, 1988
- "She", by Fat Mattress from the album Fat Mattress II, 1970
- "She", by Girls Aloud from The Promise single, 2008
- "She", by Gram Parsons from the album GP, 1973, covered by Emmylou Harris on her album Luxury Liner, 1977
- "She", by Harry Connick Jr. from his She, 1994
- "She", by Harry Styles from the album Fine Line, 2019
- "She", by Hoodoo Gurus from the album Mars Needs Guitars!
- "She", by Jeff Lynne from the album Long Wave, 2012
- "She", by Jerusalem from the album She, 2010
- "She", by Keyshia Cole from the album Point of No Return, 2014
- "She", by the Misfits from the album Static Age, 1997
- "She", by the Monkees from the album More of the Monkees, 1967
- "She", by Patrick Sky from the album Photographs
- "She", by Saves the Day from the album In Reverie, 2003
- "She", by Stiltskin from the album She, 2006
- "She", by Suede from the album Coming Up, 1996
- "She", by the Sundays from the album Static & Silence, 1997
- "She", by Tenpenny Joke from the album Ambush on All Sides, 2005
- "She", by Tommy Boyce and Bobby Hart, from the album, More of the Monkees (1967)
- "She", by Viktor Lazlo from the album She, 1985
