= Edie Brickell (album) =

Studio album by Edie Brickell
- Released: January 11, 2011
- Recorded: 2003–10
- Genre: Folk rock
- Length: 42:45
- Label: RacecarLOTTA Records
- Producer: Charlie Sexton

Edie Brickell chronology
Volcano (2003)	Edie Brickell (2011)

Professional ratings
Review scores
Source	Rating
AllMusic	3.5/5 stars

Edie Brickell is the third solo album by American singer-songwriter Edie Brickell, released in January 2011, in the same month that she released another album with her new band, The Gaddabouts.

== Development ==
Brickell started work on the album during her 2003 tour supporting Volcano. According to Brickell, "The first three songs for the solo album were recorded on a day off during the tour. They were all new songs and I wanted to record them while they were fresh and we were feeling them. Too many times I had waited months, even years to record a song and by that time, the feeling was gone and the song came out like a memory instead of an experience. So, any time I got a batch of five or six songs, I’d get together with the band and record them while they were new. I wanted to make a record where every song communicated a strong and true energy."

== Track listing ==
All tracks are written by Edie Brickell except where noted

No.	Title	Writer(s)	Length
1.	"Give It Another Day"		4:18
2.	"Pill"		3:48
3.	"Been So Good"		4:17
4.	"Always"		2:58
5.	"2 O'clock in the Morning"		5:01
6.	"On the Avenue"		4:38
7.	"Waiting for Me"		3:25
8.	"You Came Back"		5:57
9.	"It Takes Love"		3:19
10.	"Bad Way"	Edie Brickell, David Boyle, Charlie Sexton	5:04
Total length:			42:45

== Personnel ==
Musicians

- Edie Brickell – vocals, guitars
- Carter Albrecht – acoustic piano, Wurlitzer electric piano, organ, vocals
- David Boyle – keyboards, acoustic piano, Wurlitzer electric piano, Chamberlin, sampling
- Dave Palmer – grand piano
- Charlie Sexton – acoustic piano, clavinet, Mellotron, organ, 12-string acoustic guitar, acoustic guitar, electric guitars, double bass, percussion, vocals
- Dave Monsey – bass guitar
- J.J. Johnson – drums
- Jim Oblon – drums, drum programming, dumbek

Production

- Charlie Sexton – producer
- Kyle Crusham – engineer
- Dave McNair – engineer
- Brian Scheuble – engineer
- Jared Tuten – engineer
- Andy Smith – mixing
- Kevin Porter – mixing
- Greg Calbi – mastering
- Amy Beth McNeely – package design
