= Tin Tin Out =

English electronic dance music duo

- Origin: London, England
- Genres: Electronic, house, trance, downtempo, trip hop
- Years active: 1994–2004
- Members: Darren Stokes; Lindsay Edwards

Tin Tin Out were an English electronic dance music duo, comprising Darren Stokes and Lindsay Edwards. They remixed songs for a variety of artists such as Duran Duran, Erasure, Pet Shop Boys, The Corrs and Des'ree, as well as collaborating with singers such as Shelley Nelson and Emma Bunton, scoring top ten hits with both.

== Career ==
They were well known as active remixers, working on increasingly higher-profile and more commercial songs as the 1990s progressed, however also have their own recording careers. They first hit the top 20 with their 1995 cover "Always (Something There to Remind Me)". It peaked at No. 14 on the UK Singles Chart and No. 1 on the UK Dance Singles Chart. The single "Strings for Yasmin" featured in the 2001 Vinnie Jones film Mean Machine, and was used as the 1997/98 Premier League's commercial soundtrack, featuring Sean Bean. It is frequently played at Elland Road before Leeds United F.C. and at Riverside Stadium before Middlesbrough F.C. games. Their highest charting singles in the UK are a 1998 cover of "Here's Where the Story Ends" by UK dream pop act the Sundays, and the 1999 cover of "What I Am" by US adult alternative act Edie Brickell & New Bohemians, featuring guest vocals by Emma Bunton, which peaked at number two in the UK Singles Chart. Their version of "Here's Where the Story Ends" was awarded the 1999 Ivor Novello Award for Best Contemporary Song. Tin Tin Out also remixed and produced under the alias Baby Blue. Edwards and Stokes collaborated with Daniele Davoli from Black Box and DJ Tall Paul (DJ) under the name 'Tall Tin Box' for the record "God's Love" in 2001.

In addition to his involvement with Tin Tin Out, Lindsay Edwards is an Oxford University-educated researcher and lecturer who holds qualifications in both physiology and mathematics. He specialises in the fields of systems biology and machine learning, was Lecturer in Physiology at King's College London, Head of AI for Respiratory & Immunology at AstraZeneca, and is now Chief Technical Officer and Head of Platform at Relation Therapeutics.

== Discography ==
=== Albums ===
List of albums, with selected chart positions
Title	Album details	Peak chart positions
Title	Album details	UK
Adventures in Tin Tin Out Land	Released: 1996; Format: CD; Label: VC Recordings	65
Always	Released: 1998; Format: CD, 2×LP, cassette; Label:	86
Eleven to Fly	Released: 1999; Format: CD, cassette; Label:	187

=== Singles ===
List of singles, with selected chart positions and certifications, showing year released and album name
Title	Year	Peak chart positions										Certifications	Album
Title	Year	UK	AUS	FRA	GER	IRE	NL	NZ	SVK	SWE	US Dance	Certifications	Album
"The Feeling" (featuring Sweet Tee)	1994	32	225	—	—	—	—	—	—	—	—		Always
"Always (Something There to Remind Me)" (featuring Espiritu)	1995	14	121	—	—	28	—	—	—	—	—		Always
"All I Wanna Do"	1997	31	—	—	—	—	—	—	—	—	—		Always
"Dance with Me" (featuring Tony Hadley)	1997	35	—	—	—	—	—	—	—	—	—		Always
"Strings for Yasmin"	1997	31	—	—	—	—	—	—	—	—	—		Always
"Here's Where the Story Ends" (featuring Shelley Nelson)	1998	7	187	—	—	—	—	—	—	—	15	UK: Silver	Always
"Sometimes"^{1} (featuring Shelley Nelson)	1998	20	—	—	—	—	—	—	—	—	—		Eleven to Fly
"Eleven to Fly" (featuring Wendy Page)	1998	26	—	—	—	—	—	—	—	—	—		Eleven to Fly
"What I Am" (featuring Emma Bunton)	1999	2	65	75	81	14	94	48	37	52	—	UK: Silver	Eleven to Fly
"Anybody's Guess" (featuring Wendy Page)	2000	—	—	—	—	—	—	—	—	—	—		Eleven to Fly

1. The album version of "Sometimes" is an acoustic version.

=== Selected remixes ===
- 1994 TLC – "Creep"
- 1994 D:Ream – "Blame it on Me"
- 1995 Erasure – "Fingers & Thumbs (Cold Summer's Day)"
- 1995 Pet Shop Boys – "Paninaro '95"
- 1995 Marc Almond – "The Idol"
- 1995 Crystal Waters – "Relax"
- 1996 Technotronic – "Pump Up the Jam"
- 1996 Olive – "You're Not Alone"
- 1997 Erasure – "Oh L'amour"
- 1997 Chumbawamba – "Tubthumping"
- 1997 Sparks – "No. 1 Song in Heaven"
- 1998 Sash! – "Mysterious Times"
- 1998 Billie – "Girlfriend"
- 1998 Vengaboys – "We Like to Party", "Up and Down"
- 1999 Duran Duran – "Electric Barbarella", "Girls on Film"
- 1999 Lene Marlin – "Sitting Down Here"
- 1999 The Corrs – "What Can I Do"
- 1999 Lene Marlin – "Unforgiveable Sinner"
- 1999 The Corrs – "Runaway"
- 2000 Sting – "After the Rain Has Fallen"
- 2000 Whitney Houston and Enrique Iglesias – "Could I Have This Kiss Forever"
- 2000 The Pretenders – "Human"
- 2001 Anastacia – "Cowboys & Kisses"
- 2001 Anastacia – "Made For Lovin' You"
- 2001 Faith Hill – "There You'll Be"
- 2001 Emma Bunton – "Take My Breath Away"
- 2003 Simply Red – "Home"
