= Volcano (Edie Brickell album) =

Studio album by Edie Brickell
- Released: October 14, 2003
- Studio: Brooklyn Recording, New York City; The Hit Factory, New York City
- Genre: Alternative rock, folk rock
- Length: 54:41
- Label: Cherry Records, Universal
- Producer: Charlie Sexton

Edie Brickell chronology
Picture Perfect Morning (1994)	Volcano (2003)	Edie Brickell (2011)

Professional ratings
Review scores
Source	Rating
AllMusic	3/5 stars
Blender	2/5 stars
The Music Box	3.5/5 stars
Fretplay	5/5 stars

Volcano is the second solo album (fourth album overall) by American singer-songwriter Edie Brickell, released in 2003. The album sold about 21,000 copies as of November 2003.

== Track listing ==
All tracks are written by Edie Brickell.

No.	Title	Length
1.	"Rush Around"	3:33
2.	"Oo La La"	3:57
3.	"I'd Be Surprised"	2:43
4.	"Songs We Used to Sing"	4:51
5.	"Once in a Blue Moon"	4:22
6.	"Volcano"	4:41
7.	"More Than Friends"	4:36
8.	"The Messenger"	3:23
9.	"The One Who Went Away"	3:35
10.	"Take a Walk"	4:20
11.	"Not Saying Goodbye"	4:19
12.	"Came a Long Way"	5:32
13.	"What Would You Do"	4:49
Total length:		54:41

== Personnel ==
- Edie Brickell – vocals, guitars (1–9), acoustic guitar (10), backing vocals (12, 13)
- Carter Albrecht – acoustic piano (1, 4, 6, 9, 10, 11), keyboards (2), vibraphone (4), clarinet (5, 12)
- Charlie Sexton – guitars (1–7, 9, 11, 12), backing vocals (4, 11, 12), Mellotron (6), cello (6), viola (6), violin (6), keyboards (7), percussion (9), acoustic guitar (10), electric guitar (10), gut-string guitar (10), lap steel guitar (13)
- Andy Fairweather-Low – electric guitar (10), high-string acoustic guitar (10)
- Pino Palladino – bass (1–5, 7, 9, 10, 12)
- Tony Garnier – bass (6, 11), electric upright bass (13)
- Steve Gadd – drums (1–5, 7, 9, 10, 12), percussion (1, 5, 9)
- George Recile – drums (6, 11)

== Production ==
- Charlie Sexton – producer
- Andy Smith – recording, mixing
- Dan Bucchi – assistant engineer
- Suzanne Kapa – assistant engineer
- Claudius Mittendorfer – assistant engineer
- Scott Hull – mastering
- Eloise Bryan – A&R
- Jolene Cherry – A&R
- Nina Freeman – A&R
- Meg Hansen – A&R, production coordinator
- Chris Testa – drum technician
- Yuek Wong – guitar technician
- Cindy Osborne – project coordinator
- Jill Dell'Abate – production coordinator
- Sandy Brummels – art direction
- Chris Kornmann – design
- Danny Clinch – photography
- Lulu McGillicutty – drawing
- Mr. Big Stuff – drawing

== Charts ==
Album – Billboard (North America)

Year	Chart	Position
2003	The Billboard 200	188
