= Reading, Writing and Arithmetic =

Studio album by the Sundays
- Released: 15 January 1990
- Recorded: 1989–1990
- Genres: Indie pop; dream pop; jangle pop
- Length: 38:23
- Labels: Rough Trade, DGC
- Producers: The Sundays, Ray Shulman

The Sundays chronology
Reading, Writing and Arithmetic (1990)	Blind (1992)

Singles from Reading, Writing and Arithmetic
- 1. "Can't Be Sure / I Kicked a Boy" Released: February 1989; 2. "I Won" Released: November 1989; 3. "Here's Where the Story Ends" Released: January 1990

Reading, Writing and Arithmetic is the debut studio album by English alternative rock band the Sundays. It was released on 15 January 1990 by Rough Trade Records in the United Kingdom and by DGC Records in the United States. The album's title is a play on the name of the band's hometown, Reading, Berkshire.

== Background ==
Harriet Wheeler and David Gavurin met while attending the University of Bristol in the mid-1980s. Wheeler studied English literature, while Gavurin pursued a degree in Romance languages. After graduating, the two began writing music together in their free time before recruiting bassist Paul Brindley and drummer Patrick Hannan to form the Sundays in 1988.

The band developed an initial repertoire, choosing to write songs outside a conventional touring schedule. The band made several recording demo tapes, and attracted attention following a performance at the Vertigo Club in London in August 1988. The band were of interest to several record labels, ultimately signing with Rough Trade Records, and DGC Records handling distribution in the United States.

In early 1989, the Sundays released their debut single, "Can't Be Sure". Over the following year, they continued developing material, and had a session for BBC radio presenter John Peel, with recordings from the session later being used in the album. Gavurin said that the band had relatively few songs prepared when they began work on Reading, Writing, and Arithmetic, and that he and Wheeler found it difficult to write under a deadline. Wheeler similarly said that they were more concerned with their own assessment of their work than with the expectations of the press.

== Music and lyrics ==
In a retrospective review for The Quietus in 2010, Iain Moffat identified vocalist Harriet Wheeler and guitarist David Gavurin as central to the album's appeal. He highlighted Wheeler's vocal range and expressive delivery, particularly her shifts between animated phrasing and intimate vocals on "Skin & Bones", as well as the contrast between her singing and the everyday lyrical details of "You're Not the Only One I Know". Moffat also praised Gavurin's melodic guitar playing, noting influences from Johnny Marr and James Honeyman-Scott while emphasising the distinctive character of his performances.

Moffat interpreted the album as a reflection of student life and the uncertainty associated with the transition to adulthood, and perceived "Hideous Towns" being about apprehension about the future, and "I Won" as an unusual treatment of tensions surrounding shared accommodation. Praising the songwriting for its wordplay, poetic imagery and observations drawn from everyday experiences, Moffat citied "My Finest Hour" as an example of the band's ability to find significance in an apparently mundane event.

== Critical reception ==
Professional ratings
Review scores
Source	Rating
AllMusic	4.5/5 stars
Chicago Sun-Times	4/4 stars
Classic Pop	4.5/5 stars
Entertainment Weekly	A−
NME	8/10
Q	3/5 stars
Record Mirror	4.5/5 stars
Rolling Stone	4/5 stars
Spin Alternative Record Guide	8/10
The Virgin Encyclopedia of Nineties Music	3/5 stars

Reviews were generally favourable toward Reading, Writing, and Arithmetic. The Toronto Star compared lead vocalist Harriet Wheeler to Edie Brickell, noting that "the two bring the same trippy sense of coquettish, off-the-cuff muse to a foundation of quirky, guitar-based arrangements." The Los Angeles Times wrote that the album "carries just enough mystery and grace to recall the early promise of 10,000 Maniacs".

Ira Robbins of Rolling Stone described the album as "a collection of uncommonly good songs graced by Harriet Wheeler's wondrous singing". He praised Wheeler's expressive voice and the melodies and lyrics, which he characterised as offering offbeat observations about life, love, and the English climate.

In a retrospective review for Stylus Magazine's On Second Thought series, John Polewach argued that the album became more rewarding with repeated listening, despite initially reminding him of the Smiths. He distinguished the Sundays' treatment of love and desire from what he regarded as the Smiths' more pessimistic perspective. Interpreting songs including "Can't Be Sure", "Skin & Bones" and "My Finest Hour", Polewach discussed their treatment of physical desire, emotional connection and uncertainty, arguing that "My Finest Hour", particularly its closing section, encapsulated the album's central themes.

Similarly, Ben French of Nude as the News described the album as "a masterpiece, by any standard" and wrote that repeated listening became more rewarding. He praised Wheeler's vocal range and expressiveness, the instrumental arrangements and the band's songwriting, highlighting the gradual build of "Can't Be Sure" and the bass-led arrangement of "Joy". French compared the group's sound to a combination of the Police's rhythmic precision and the more upbeat material of the Cure.

The album has also appeared on retrospective lists of notable albums. Pitchfork ranked it 15th on its list of "The 30 Best Dream Pop Albums". The publication also included it on its list of "The 25 Best Indie Pop Albums of the '90s", describing its bookish character and contrasting Wheeler's vocals with Gavurin's guitar playing. In 2024, Uncut ranked the album at No. 134 on its list of "The 500 Greatest Albums of the 1990s".

== Track listing ==
All tracks are written by David Gavurin and Harriet Wheeler.

No.	Title	Length
1.	"Skin & Bones"	4:16
2.	"Here's Where the Story Ends"	3:54
3.	"Can't Be Sure"	3:22
4.	"I Won"	4:23
5.	"Hideous Towns"	3:46
6.	"You're Not the Only One I Know"	3:50
7.	"A Certain Someone"	4:25
8.	"I Kicked a Boy"	2:16
9.	"My Finest Hour"	3:59
10.	"Joy"	4:10
Total length:		38:23

== Personnel ==
- Harriet Wheeler – vocals
- David Gavurin – guitar
- Paul Brindley – bass
- Patrick Hannan – drums
- Lindsay Jamieson – tambourine

== Charts ==
Chart performance for Reading, Writing and Arithmetic
Chart (1990)	Peak position
Australian Albums (ARIA)	40
Dutch Albums (Album Top 100)	56
New Zealand Albums (RMNZ)	37
UK Albums (Official Charts)	4
US Billboard 200	39

== Certifications ==
Certifications
Region	Certification	Certified units/sales
United Kingdom (BPI)	Gold	100,000^{‡}
^{‡} Sales+streaming figures based on certification alone.
