= Ghost of a Dog =

Studio album by Edie Brickell & New Bohemians
- Released: October 30, 1990
- Genre: Alternative rock, jangle pop, folk-rock
- Length: 53:29
- Label: Geffen
- Producer: Tony Berg

Edie Brickell & New Bohemians chronology
Shooting Rubberbands at the Stars (1988)	Ghost of a Dog (1990)	Stranger Things (2006)

Singles from Ghost of a Dog
- 1. "Mama Help Me" Released: 1990; 2. "Black and Blue" Released: 1991

Professional ratings
Review scores
Source	Rating
AllMusic	4/5 stars
The Encyclopedia of Popular Music	3/5 stars
Entertainment Weekly	B−
MusicHound Rock: The Essential Album Guide	3/5 stars
The Rolling Stone Album Guide	3.5/5 stars

Ghost of a Dog is the second album by American alternative rock band Edie Brickell & New Bohemians, released in 1990.

In the printed lyrics that accompany the album, each song has a word with a single letter missing. In order, they spell out "ghost of a dog."

The album sold about 500,000 copies. After a tour in support of the album, the band decided to take an indefinite hiatus.

== Production ==
The album was produced by Tony Berg. Unlike on the debut, where many tracks used session musicians, the New Bohemians play throughout Ghost of a Dog.

== Critical reception ==
The Los Angeles Times thought that "Brickell and the Bohemians band do a reasonable job of recycling the soothing elements of ‘60s pop-folk, but her own views are so childlike and her images so often pointless that it’s hard to work up any feeling for them." Entertainment Weekly wrote: "Brickell can write lyrically about the difference between the desire for romantic independence and desire itself. But just when she starts to show some grit, she’ll drift toward smiley-faced ditties like 'Oak Cliff Bra' — songs so cloying they make you wonder if Brickell underwent a lobotomy between tracks." Andrew Collins of NME wrote, "Twee? A little, but it's laced with a Lynchian fascination with death which adds a nice depth."

The New York Times declared that none of the songs recaptured the charm of the first album's "What I Am". The Chicago Tribune wrote that Brickell's "ability to write wisely about the bad stuff of romance with a marked lack of anger toward the opposite sex makes her unique and-for postmodern romantics-endearing."

== Track listing ==
No.	Title	Writer(s)	Length
1.	"Mama Help Me"	Edie Brickell, Kenny Withrow, John Bush	4:02
2.	"Black and Blue"	Edie Brickell	3:55
3.	"Carmelito"	Edie Brickell, Kenny Withrow, Wes Burt-Martin, Brad Houser, Matt Chamberlain, John Bush	4:12
4.	"He Said"	Edie Brickell	5:24
5.	"Times Like This"	Edie Brickell, Kenny Withrow	2:56
6.	"10,000 Angels"	Edie Brickell, Kenny Withrow, John Bush	6:06
7.	"Ghost of a Dog"	Edie Brickell, Kenny Withrow	1:34
8.	"Strings of Love"	Edie Brickell, Kenny Withrow	4:13
9.	"Woyaho"	Edie Brickell, Kenny Withrow	2:34
10.	"Oak Cliff Bra"	Edie Brickell	1:28
11.	"Stwisted"	Edie Brickell	5:09
12.	"This Eye"	Edie Brickell	3:18
13.	"Forgiven"	Edie Brickell, Kenny Withrow, Wes Burt-Martin, Brad Houser, Matt Chamberlain, John Bush	5:35
14.	"Me By the Sea"	Edie Brickell	3:03

== Personnel ==
The New Bohemians

- Edie Brickell – vocals, acoustic guitar
- Kenny Withrow – acoustic guitar, electric guitar, dobro, slide guitar, backing vocals
- Wes Burt-Martin – acoustic guitar, electric guitar, backing vocals, string arrangements (9)
- Brad Houser – bass
- Matt Chamberlain – drums
- John Bush – percussion

Additional musicians

- Tony Berg – keyboards, guitars, string arrangements (9)
- Paul Fox – keyboards
- Danny Timms – acoustic piano (1)
- Jo-El Sonnier – accordion (3)
- Paul "Wix" Wickens – keyboards (8)
- David Mansfield – acoustic guitar (8)
- Larry Corbett – cello (9)
- Novi Novog – viola (9)
- Sid Page – violin (9)
- John Lydon – backing vocals (8)

== Production ==
- Tony Berg – producer, mixing (5, 14)
- Chris Lord-Alge – recording
- Susan Rogers – recording, mixing (7, 12)
- David Thoener – recording
- Ken Jordan – additional recording
- Greg Goldman – assistant engineer
- Mike Reiter – assistant engineer
- Bob Clearmountain – mixing (1–4, 6, 8–11, 13)
- George Marino – mastering
- Robin Sloane – creative director
- Lyn Bradley – design, layout
- Janet Wolsborn – design, layout
- Ann Cutting – photographic tinting

Studios

- Recorded at Bearsville Studios (Bearsville, New York); The Village Recorder and Zeitgeist Studios (Los Angeles, California).
- Mixed at A&M Studios (Hollywood, California).
- Mastered at Sterling Sound (New York City, New York).

== Charts ==
Album – Billboard (United States)

Year	Chart	Position
1990	The Billboard 200	32

Singles – Billboard (United States)

Year	Single	Chart	Position
1990	"Mama Help Me"	Mainstream Rock Tracks	26
1990	"Mama Help Me"	Modern Rock Tracks	17
