= Picture Perfect Morning =

Studio album by Edie Brickell
- Released: August 16, 1994
- Genre: Rock
- Length: 41:04
- Label: Geffen
- Producers: David Bromberg, Roy Halee, Paul Simon

Edie Brickell chronology
| Picture Perfect Morning (1994) | Volcano (2003) |

Picture Perfect Morning is the solo debut album by American singer-songwriter Edie Brickell, released in 1994. The video for "Good Times" was among the multimedia samples included on Microsoft’s Windows 95 Companion CD-ROM.

== Critical reception ==
Professional ratings
Review scores
| Source | Rating |
|---|---|
| AllMusic | 2/5 stars |

The Washington Post concluded that "the music is severely compromised ... by Brickell's singsong delivery and her apparent inability to convey anything more compelling than a pervasive sense of ennui... Though she sings of good times and hard times, pleasure and pain, her emotional input is every bit as modest as her vocal range."

== Track listing ==
All tracks written by Edie Brickell.

1. "Tomorrow Comes" – 3:56
2. "Green" – 3:21
3. "When the Lights Go Down" – 3:48
4. "Good Times" – 3:09
5. "Another Woman's Dream" – 2:45
6. "Stay Awhile" – 4:35
7. "Hard Times" – 3:41
8. "Olivia" – 3:43
9. "In the Bath" – 2:43
10. "Picture Perfect Morning" – 3:20
11. "Lost in the Moment" – 6:03

== Personnel ==
- Edie Brickell – vocals, acoustic guitar (1, 2, 3, 7, 9, 10, 11)
- Art Neville – organ (1), keyboards (4), electric piano (5)
- Leon Pendarvis – synthesizers (2)
- Dr. John – acoustic piano (6), synthesizers (10)
- Joel Diamond – organ (6)
- Michael Bearden – synthesizers (7)
- Steve Riley – accordion (10)
- Bill Dillon – electric guitar (1–5, 7, 8, 9, 11)
- Brian Stoltz – electric guitar (1, 4, 5)
- John Leventhal – acoustic guitar (2), electric guitar (7, 11)
- Paul Simon – acoustic guitar (2, 3, 10)
- Kenny Withrow – electric guitar (3, 7, 8, 9)
- David Bromberg – slide guitar (6)
- Larry Campbell – pedal steel guitar (2, 6), violin (2)
- Jerry Douglas – dobro (6)
- Nelson González – tres (8)
- Tony Hall – bass (1, 4, 5)
- Butch Amiot – bass (2, 6)
- Brad Houser – bass (3, 9)
- Bakithi Kumalo – bass (7, 8, 10, 11)
- Willie Green – drums (1, 4, 5)
- Shawn Pelton – drums (3, 7–11)
- Richard Crooks – drums (6)
- Cyril Neville – percussion (1)
- Cyro Baptista – percussion (2)
- Mingo Araújo – percussion (3)
- Errol "Crusher" Bennett – percussion (5)
- Madeleine Yayodele Nelson – chakeire (5), backing vocals (5)
- Bashiri Johnson – congas (7), percussion (9, 11)
- Dave Samuels – vibraphone (7)
- John Bush – triangle (9)
- Skip La Plante – percussion (10)
- Herb Besson – trombone (6)
- Michael Davis – trombone (6)
- Keith O'Quinn – trombone (6)
- James Pugh – trombone (6)
- Michael Brecker – EWI (9)
- The Dixie Cups – backing vocals (1)
- Charles Elam III – backing vocals (4)
- Terrance Manuel – backing vocals (4)
- Earl Smith Jr. – backing vocals (4)
- Barry White – spoken voice (4)
- Phyllis Bethel – backing vocals (5)
- Victor Cook – backing vocals (7)
- Dennis King – backing vocals (7)
- Maurice Lauchner – backing vocals (7)
- Vivian Cherry – backing vocals (11)

Production

- Paul Simon – producer
- Roy Halee – producer, engineer
- Andy Smith – second engineer
- Malcolm Burn – recording (1, 4, 5)
- Roger Branch – recording assistant (1, 4, 5)
- David Bromberg – bass and violin recording (2), co-producer (6)
- Dave Wittman – bass and violin recording assistant (2)
- Greg Calbi – mastering
- Tom Zutaut – A&R
- Jimmy Corona – session coordinator
- Marc Silag – session coordinator
- Dolores Lusitana – project coordinator
- Leslie Horan Smith – painting
- Michael Halsband – photography
- Vaughn Hazell – back cover photography
- Kevin Mazur – photography (Edie and Roy Halee)

Studios

- Engineered at The Hit Factory (New York City, New York).
- Recorded at Electric Lady Studios (New York City, New York) and Sea-Saint Studio (New Orleans, Louisiana).
- Mastered at Masterdisk (New York City, New York).

== Charts ==
| Chart (1994) | Peak position |
|---|---|
| Australian Albums (ARIA Charts) | 59 |
| The Billboard 200 | 68 |
