= Sorta =

Sorta may refer to:

- Sorta (band), a rock band from Dallas, Texas
- Southwest Ohio Regional Transit Authority (SORTA), public transport agency in Cincinnati, Ohio
- sorta- was an unofficial early twenty-first-century proposal for an SI unit prefix standing for 10^{42}
