= Summertime (The Sundays song) =

1997 single by the Sundays

Single by the Sundays

from the album Static & Silence
- B-side: "Nothing Sweet"; "Gone"
- Released: 8 September 1997
- Studio: Home; RAK (London, England)
- Genre: Dream pop
- Length: 3:35
- Label: Parlophone
- Songwriters: David Gavurin; Harriet Wheeler
- Producers: David Gavurin; Harriet Wheeler

The Sundays singles chronology
"Goodbye" (1992)	"Summertime" (1997)	"Cry" (1997)

Music video
- "Summertime" on YouTube

"Summertime" is a song by English alternative rock band the Sundays. Written and produced by guitarist David Gavurin and lead singer Harriet Wheeler, the song was recorded for the band's third and final studio album, Static & Silence (1997), and released on 8 September 1997 as the first single from the album. Wheeler and Gavurin were inspired to write the song after several of their friends joined a dating service, and the lyrics reflect on how the pursuit of perfect romantic relationships can become taxing.

"Summertime" became the Sundays' most successful single worldwide, peaking at number 15 in their native United Kingdom and entering the top 50 in Australia and Canada. In the United States, the song was not eligible to chart on the Billboard Hot 100 at the time because it was not released as a physical single. It instead reached number 50 on the Billboard Hot 100 Airplay chart, number seven on the Triple-A chart, number 10 on the Modern Rock Tracks chart, and number 13 on the Adult Top 40.

== Background and meaning ==
According to band members Harriet Wheeler and David Gavurin, the couple wrote "Summertime" after a few of their friends signed up for a dating service. Gavurin elaborated that he was inspired to write the song because practices such as joining singles groups and advertising oneself for romance was becoming more "respectable", despite the fact that both he and Wheeler believed these practices were "tragic and funny" and took away the chance for people to meet face-to-face. Gavurin went on to say, "And people can really oppress themselves with that mythic picture of romance, so we just wanted to address in a tongue-in-cheek way that the easily gained perfect partnership is indeed a myth." The lyrics of the song reflect their beliefs. According to Billboard editor Bradley Bambarger, the song "examines the burdensome ideal of romantic bliss".

== Composition ==
"Summertime" is a dream pop song in the key of A major and has a tempo of 96 beats per minute, featuring Wheeler on vocals, Gavurin on guitar, Paul Brindley on bass guitar, and Patrick Hannan on drums.

== Track listings ==
UK CD1

1. "Summertime" – 3:35
2. "Nothing Sweet" – 3:03
3. "Gone" – 3:52

UK CD2

1. "Summertime" – 3:34
2. "Skin & Bones" (live) – 4:12
3. "Here's Where the Story Ends" (live) – 4:01

UK limited-edition 7-inch single

A. "Summertime"
B. "Nothing Sweet"

European and Australian CD single

1. "Summertime" – 3:34
2. "Here's Where the Story Ends" (live) – 4:03
3. "Nothing Sweet" – 3:03
4. "Gone" – 3:51

== Credits and personnel ==
Credits are lifted from the Static & Silence booklet and the UK CD2 liner notes.

Studios

- Recorded at home and RAK (London, England)
- Mixed at Air Studios, Abbey Road Studios, and Mayfair Studios (London, England)

The Sundays

- Harriet Wheeler – writing, vocals, production, engineering, mixing, sleeve artwork
- David Gavurin – writing, guitars, production, engineering, mixing, sleeve artwork
- Paul Brindley – bass guitar
- Patrick Hannan – drums

Other personnel

- Dave Anderson – engineering, mixing
- Slim Smith – sleeve artwork
- Zela Pictures – photography

== Charts ==
=== Weekly charts ===
Chart (1997–1998)	Peak position
Australia (ARIA)	41
Canada Top Singles (RPM)	48
Canada Adult Contemporary (RPM)	49
Estonia (Eesti Top 20)	11
Europe (Eurochart Hot 100)	56
Scottish Singles Sales (Official Charts)	14
UK Singles (Official Charts)	15
US Hot 100 Airplay (Billboard)	50
US Adult Top 40 (Billboard)	13
US Modern Rock Tracks (Billboard)	10
US Triple-A (Billboard)	7

=== Year-end charts ===
Chart (1997)	Position
US Modern Rock Tracks (Billboard)	63
US Triple-A (Billboard)	40

Chart (1998)	Position
US Adult Top 40 (Billboard)	55

== Release history ==
Region	Date	Format(s)	Label(s)	Ref(s).
United States	18 August 1997	Modern rock radio	DGC	
United States	26 August 1997	Contemporary hit radio	DGC	
United Kingdom	8 September 1997	7-inch vinyl; CD	Parlophone	
