= Oh My Soul (disambiguation) =

"Oh My Soul" is a 1958 song by Little Richard.

Oh My Soul may also refer to:

- "O My Soul", a 1974 song by Big Star from Radio City
- "Oh My Soul", a 1976 song by Crystal Gale from Crystal
- "Oh My Soul", a 1978 song by Garland Jeffreys from One-Eyed Jack
- "Oh My Soul!", a 1999 song by Thrush Hermit from Clayton Park
- "Oh My Soul", a 2003 by Keith Getty and Margaret Becker from New Irish Hymns 2
- "Oh My Soul", a 2006 song by Edie Brickell & New Bohemians from Stranger Things
- "Oh My Soul", a 2016 song by Casting Crowns from The Very Next Thing
