= Sorta (band) =

American rock band

- Genres: Rock
- Years active: 2001–2007
- Members: Danny Balis; Trey Carmichael; Ward Williams; Chris Holt
- Past members: Carter Albrecht; Scott Randall; Tom Bridwell; Trey Johnson
- Website: Official Myspace site Official band website

Sorta was a rock band based in Dallas, Texas. The band has been honored with various awards over the years, including awards for individual group members, and a "Best Act in Town" win in 2006. In September 2007, the band's keyboardist, Carter Albrecht (who also played with Edie Brickell & New Bohemians) was shot and killed by his girlfriend's neighbor.

== Career ==
Sorta was formed in 2000 by Trey Johnson and Danny Balis, after meeting in the Dallas bar the Barley House. Albrecht sat in on the keyboards at a gig shortly thereafter. They released their debut EP, Plays for Lovers, later that year. The band expanded in 2002, and released their first full-length album, Laugh Out Loud that same year. In 2003, Albrecht was honored as both Musician and Songwriter of the year by the Dallas Observer, while Trey Johnson received the Male Vocalist honors that same year. Two years later, they released Little Bay—which has been called their "most fully realized studio creation to date"—to wide acclaim. Paste called it "a batch of tunes as well crafted as any you’re likely to encounter this year." A song from that album, "Sink or Swim", was chosen by Liz Phair as one of 10 songs to be included on the Maybelline New York/JANE Reader CD for 2004. Chris Holt, who plays guitar and keys, joined the band in 2006, after having won the "Musician of the Year" given by the Dallas Observer the year before.

After a long delay, caused by disagreements with the small label the band had signed with, Sorta released 2006's Strange and Sad but True. It was well received by both critics, and fans alike, as it was listed at #7 in the "Local Favorites" section of the October 7, 2007 issue of Rolling Stone, landing just ahead of Wilco, and just behind The White Stripes on the chart. The band was honored as "Best Act in Town" by the Observer in 2006, following a run that saw Liz Phair pick one of their songs in 2004, and shows such as Grey's Anatomy use their work as well. In 2007, Holt was honored again as Musician of the Year. The band released its final album, titled simply Sorta, in the fall of 2008 and performed its last show at the House of Blues in Dallas on October 23, 2008.

== Death of Carter Albrecht ==
In the pre-dawn hours of 3 September 2007, Albrecht was shot and killed by his girlfriend's neighbor, William "Smokey" Logg, ironically also a local musician of some renown. After having some drinks with his girlfriend Ryann Rathbone at a Dallas bar, Albrecht became intoxicated. Rathbone drove him to her house, and they both took their dose of controversial prescription smoking cessation drug Chantix. A short while later, Albrecht began speaking incoherently, broke a drinking glass on a table, and hit Rathbone several times, something he had never done before. She ran outside, and Albrecht followed. Rathbone re-entered her home and locked the doors behind her. Albrecht yelled and pounded on her front door in an unsuccessful attempt to reenter her house.

At this point, Albrecht went into Logg's backyard, apparently mistaking that yard for Rathbone's. Logg and his wife were awakened by the loud pounding and yelling at their back door. Logg told Albrecht to stop, but he did not; Logg then says he fired a "warning shot" through the door. The door was made of thick, opaque glass, and the porch was well lit. The shot hit the 6' 5" Albrecht in the head, and he died at the scene. No charges were filed. This effectively ended the band.

== Lineup ==
Sorta's lineup was as follows:

- Trey Johnson-vocals, guitars (died 2022)
- Danny Balis-bass, guitar, vocals
- Trey Carmichael-drumkit
- Ward Williams-pedal steel, slide guitar
- Chris Holt-guitar, keys, vocals
- Tom Bridwell-drums
