= Blind (The Sundays album) =

Studio album by The Sundays
- Released: 19 October 1992
- Genres: Indie pop; dream pop; alternative pop; folk
- Length: 45:45
- Labels: Parlophone, DGC
- Producers: The Sundays, Dave Anderson

The Sundays chronology
Reading, Writing and Arithmetic (1990)	Blind (1992)	Static & Silence (1997)

Singles from Blind
- 1. "Love" Released: 1992; 2. "Goodbye" Released: 1992

Professional ratings
Review scores
Source	Rating
AllMusic	3/5 stars
Chicago Tribune	2.5/4 stars
Robert Christgau	(dud)
The Encyclopedia of Popular Music	3/5 stars
Entertainment Weekly	B−
MusicHound Rock: The Essential Album Guide	4/5 stars
Select	5/5
Spin Alternative Record Guide	6/10

Blind is the second studio album by the Sundays. It was released by Parlophone on 19 October 1992 in the UK, then in the US by Geffen the following day. It is often considered the darkest and most experimental of The Sundays' albums, noted for its melancholic lyrics and closer resemblance to the darker dream pop work of artists such as Cocteau Twins. The title of the album is from a lyric in the song "24 Hours".

The album peaked at No. 15 on the UK Albums Chart.

== Background and production ==
The album was co-produced by Dave Anderson.

== Music ==
Musically, the album contains "gentle, folk-based guitars and pop melodies."

== Critical reception ==
Trouser Press wrote that "while increased confidence and ambition make Wheeler’s singing more technically accomplished, her development from adolescent wonder to adult aplomb deducts some of the band’s gravity-defying magic."

Stephen Thomas Erlewine of AllMusic gave the album three stars out of five, stating his opinion that The Sundays does not feature as many strong tracks as its predecessor, Reading, Writing and Arithmetic.

== Track listing ==
All songs by David Gavurin and Harriet Wheeler, except "Wild Horses", written by Mick Jagger and Keith Richards.

1. "I Feel" – 4:02
2. "Goodbye" – 4:45
3. "Life & Soul" – 2:37
4. "More" – 2:43
5. "On Earth" – 2:23
6. "God Made Me" – 4:50
7. "Love" – 4:33
8. "What Do You Think?" – 3:57
9. "24 Hours" – 3:29
10. "Blood on My Hands" – 3:40
11. "Medicine" – 3:42
12. "Wild Horses" – 4:45

The final track only appears on American release of this album and as a B-side of the UK single version of "Goodbye".

== Personnel ==
- Harriet Wheeler – vocals, production
- David Gavurin – guitar, production
- Paul Brindley – bass
- Patrick Hannan – drums
- Lindsay Jamieson – tambourine
- Dave Anderson – engineer, production

== Charts ==
Chart performance for Blind
Chart (1992–1993)	Peak position
Australian Albums (ARIA)	78
UK Albums (Official Charts)	15
US Billboard 200	103
