= Look Out Now! =

Studio album by The Gaddabouts
- Released: April 16, 2012
- Recorded: April, July 2011
- Genre: Jazz pop, folk rock, Americana
- Length: 1:07:39
- Label: RacecarLOTTA Records
- Producer: Steve Gadd

The Gaddabouts chronology
The Gaddabouts (2011)	Look Out Now! (2012)

Professional ratings
Review scores
Source	Rating
PopMatters	6/10 stars

Look Out Now! is the second album by The Gaddabouts, released in April 2012 as a double CD. The band consists of Edie Brickell, drummer Steve Gadd, guitarist Andy Fairweather Low and bass player Pino Palladino.

== Development ==
The album takes a casual easygoing approach that marries Brickell's laid-back songs with the skills of the seasoned session professional musicians. The album consists of a certain amount of improvisation. The first song, a one-minute tune called "Meat on Your Bones", was spontaneously written and recorded, setting a tone of not taking the recording of the music too seriously for the first few songs, aiming for loose, spontaneous, and inviting, creating a playful band dynamic. Gadd, who is the de facto bandleader, reports that the song creation process has Brickell creating songs, and the rest of the band develop the ideas, inspiring music of the others. Brickell reports that the band transforms the song into something with a lot more personality than she had conceived. Brickell found that working with The Gaddabouts inspired a joy of music creation because instead of playing a song 50 times, with the seasoned crew they could develop the song they wanted in one take, keeping everything as live as possible in the studio. Gadd had a goal of preserving the magic of first takes when developing the album.

== Track listing ==
- Total length: 1:07:39
- All tracks written by Edie Brickell

Disc one
No.	Title	Length
1.	"Meat on Your Bones"	1:01
2.	"Look Out Now!"	3:41
3.	"Wicked William"	2:55
4.	"House on Fire"	4:31
5.	"I'm a Van"	3:49
6.	"River Rises"	5:50
7.	"The Horse's Mouth"	3:34
8.	"Blessed Days"	4:01
9.	"Devil's Story"	5:47
10.	"Down"	4:04
Total length:		39:13

Disc two
No.	Title	Length
11.	"Free"	4:22
12.	"The Mountain"	4:29
13.	"Don't Take All Day"	4:37
14.	"How I Love You"	3:00
15.	"Can You Feel It"	3:14
16.	"Younger Woman"	4:08
17.	"Corruption"	4:36
Total length:		28:26

== Personnel ==
The Gaddabouts

- Edie Brickell – vocals, guitar
- Steve Gadd – drums, percussion, vocals
- Andy Fairweather Low – guitars, bass harmonica, vocals
- Pino Palladino – bass, tres, guitars, vocals

Guest musicians

- Ronnie Cuber – baritone saxophone, tenor saxophone, flute, bass clarinet, vocals
- Larry Goldings – piano, keyboards, organ, accordion
- Pedro Martínez – batá, bongos, congas, timbales, güiro, vocals
- Axle Tosca – piano, vocals
- Andrea Zahn – violin
- Mike Mainieri – marimba, orchestra bells, vibraphone
- Bob Mallory, Roy Hendrickson, Kirk Imamura, Tyler Hartman – ambient sounds, mumblings for "Horse's Mouth"
- Ingrid Ingrate, Greta Kline, Lulu, Bob Mallory, Pedro Martinez, Axle Tosca, Steve Gadd, Pino Palladino, Ronnie Cuver, Andy Fairweather Low – vocals on "Corruption"

Production

- Producer – Steve Gadd
- Engineer, mixing, recording – Andy Smith
- Mastering – Greg Calbi
- Second engineers – Bob Mallory, David Rowland
- Instrument technician – Mike Burns
- Design and art Direction – Amy Beth McNeely
- Cover painting – Jennifer Delilah
