= Cry (The Sundays song) =

1997 single by the Sundays

Single by the Sundays

from the album Static & Silence
- B-side: "Through the Dark"; "Life Goes On"
- Released: 10 November 1997
- Length: 4:07
- Label: Parlophone
- Songwriters: David Gavurin; Harriet Wheeler
- Producers: David Gavurin; Harriet Wheeler

The Sundays singles chronology
"Summertime" (1997)	"Cry" (1997)

"Cry" is a song by English alternative rock band the Sundays. Written and produced by guitarist David Gavurin and lead singer Harriet Wheeler, the song was recorded for the band's third and final studio album, Static & Silence (1997), and released on 10 November 1997 as the second single from the album. The song reached number 43 on the UK Singles Chart.

== Track listings ==
UK CD1

1. "Cry"
2. "Can't Be Sure" (demo)
3. "You're Not the Only One I Know" (demo)

UK CD2

1. "Cry"
2. "Through the Dark"
3. "Life Goes On"

UK cassette single

1. "Cry"
2. "Through the Dark"

== Personnel ==
- Harriet Wheeler – vocals, engineering, mixing
- David Gavurin – guitar, engineering, mixing
- Paul Brindley – bass guitar
- Patrick Hannan – drums
- Dave Anderson – engineering, mixing

== Charts ==
Chart (1997)	Peak position
Scotland Singles (OCC)	37
UK Singles (OCC)	43

== Release history ==
Region	Date	Format(s)	Label(s)	Ref.
United Kingdom	10 November 1997	CD; cassette	Parlophone	
United States	12 January 1998	Modern rock radio	DGC	
United States	10 February 1998	Contemporary hit radio	DGC	
