= Rocket (Edie Brickell & New Bohemians album) =

Studio album by Edie Brickell & New Bohemians
- Released: October 12, 2018
- Recorded: 2017
- Studio: Arlyn Studios and Cicada Moon Studios (Austin, Texas).
- Genre: Rock
- Length: 48:50
- Label: Verve Forecast
- Producer: Kyle Crusham

Edie Brickell & New Bohemians chronology
Stranger Things (2006)	Rocket (2018)	Hunter and the Dog Star (2021)

Singles from Rocket
- 1. "What Makes You Happy" Released: September 13, 2018; 2. "Tell Me" Released: September 27, 2018

Rocket is an album by Edie Brickell & New Bohemians. The album was released on October 12, 2018, and is their first album since 2006's Stranger Things. The band wrote the songs on the album during the rehearsals of their 2017 La Rondalla Benefit Concert. After that they decided to record them, and the band recorded seven songs in eight days. The lead singer of the band, Edie Brickell, says that the album doesn't have too much structure, and often bounces between genres. Brickell also hopes that this album becomes a new beginning for the band and will bring them back on the radar.

== Singles ==
"What Makes You Happy" was released as the first single on September 13, 2018 along with a music video to accompany it. The second single, "Tell Me" was released on September 27, 2018.

== Track listing ==
No.	Title	Writer(s)	Length
1.	"What Makes You Happy"	Edie Brickell	4:02
2.	"Superhero"	Brickell, Kenny Withrow	4:34
3.	"Obvious"	Brickell, Withrow, Brad Houser, John Bush, Brandon Aly	5:03
4.	"Trust"	Brickell, Withrow	3:50
5.	"Singing in the Shower"	Brickell, Withrow	2:44
6.	"I Don't Need a Man"	Brickell	2:57
7.	"Exaggerate"	Brickell, Withrow, Houser, Bush, Aly	2:45
8.	"Eyes in the Window"	Brickell, Withrow	4:47
9.	"Colors"	Brickell, Withrow, Houser, Bush, Aly	4:17
10.	"Drawn to You"	Brickell, Withrow	3:22
11.	"Tell Me"	Brickell, Withrow, Houser, Bush, Aly	3:24
12.	"Green Magic"	Brickell, Withrow, Houser, Bush, Aly	4:38
13.	"Far Away"	Brickell	2:26
Total length:			48:49

== Personnel ==
- Edie Brickell – vocals, electric guitar (6), acoustic guitar (13)
- Kyle Crusham – Hammond B3 organ (1), Roland Juno-106 (2), wind controller (2), Prophet-6 (3), Moog bass (3), ARP synthesizer (6, 8), acoustic guitar (6), acoustic piano (8), Mellotron (8, 13), baritone guitar (8), treatments (12)
- Matt Hubbard – organ (1, 4, 7, 12), Prophet-6 (1, 9), backing vocals (1), Hammond B3 organ (2, 5, 8, 9, 10), Wurlitzer electric piano (2, 3, 8, 9), acoustic piano (3, 4, 7, 10, 11), Roland Juno-106 (3), Mellotron (3, 9, 11), Moog synthesizer (3, 5), synthesizers (4, 12), vibraphone (11)
- Dave Monsey – acoustic piano (6), Rhodes piano (6), Hammond B3 organ (6), bass guitar (6, 13)
- Jordan Knull – Moog synthesizer (12)
- Dave Palmer – acoustic piano (13)
- Kenny Withrow – electric guitars (1–6, 8–11, 13), bass guitar (1), backing vocals (1, 5), acoustic guitar (2, 4, 5, 11), guitars (7, 12), 12-string acoustic guitar (10)
- Brad Houser – Moog bass (1), backing vocals (1), bass guitar (2–5, 7, 8, 9, 11, 12), Moog synthesizer (8), electric upright bass (10), saxophone (12)
- Brandon Aly – drums (1–5, 7–12), backing vocals (1)
- Matt Chamberlain – drums (6), percussion (6)
- Aaron Comess – drums (13)
- John Bush – percussion (1–5, 7–12), backing vocals (1, 8), drums (2), Roland Juno-106 (8)
- Todd Crusham – toy bells (12)
- Alice Spencer – backing vocals (1, 9)
- Lulu Simon – backing vocals (3)
- Hunter Hendrickson – backing vocals (7)

== Production ==
- Kyle Crusham – producer, engineer, mixing (1–5, 7–13)
- Dave Monsey – co-producer (6)
- Charlie Sexton – producer (13)
- Tchad Blake – mixing (6)
- Natalie Weber – A&R
- Melody Ewing – A&R administration
- Femi Onafowokan – A&R administration
- Rafaela Hernández – production manager
- Julie Johantgen – release coordinator
- Chad Evans – packaging, artwork
- Jacob Lerman – design
- Todd Crusham – photography
- Jeff Kramer – management
- Cindy Osborne – management
