= Can't Be Sure =

1989 single by The Sundays

Single by The Sundays

from the album Reading, Writing and Arithmetic
- B-side: "I Kicked a Boy" "Don't Tell Your Mother"
- Released: January 1989
- Recorded: 1989
- Genre: Indie pop; dream pop
- Length: 3:22
- Label: Rough Trade
- Songwriter(s): David Gavurin; Harriet Wheeler
- Producer(s): The Sundays; Ray Shulman

The Sundays singles chronology
"Can't Be Sure" (1989)	"Here's Where the Story Ends" (1990)

"Can't Be Sure" is the debut single by British indie pop group the Sundays. It was the first (and in the United Kingdom, only) single to be released from their album Reading, Writing and Arithmetic, which was released a year later. The B-side was "I Kicked a Boy", which also appeared on the album. The 12" single contained an additional, non-album track, "Don't Tell Your Mother". The single reached number 45 on the UK Singles Chart and number 74 in Australia, and it was voted number one in John Peel's Festive Fifty for 1989.

== Lyrical content ==
The song's lyrical theme is "desire", treated as a general concept rather than being directed towards anything or anyone in particular.

And did you know desire's a terrible thing?
The worst that I can find
Did you know desire's a terrible thing?
But I rely on mine.

By the song's closing refrain, the song's narrator appears to have come to terms with, if not necessarily resolved, the dichotomy:

And it's my love, And it's my life
And though I can't be sure if I want any more
It will come to me later.

== Charts ==
Chart performance for "Can't Be Sure"
Chart (1989–1990)	Peak position
Australia (ARIA)	74
UK Singles (OCC)	45
