= Stranger Things (Edie Brickell & New Bohemians album) =

Studio album by Edie Brickell & New Bohemians
- Released: July 25, 2006
- Studio: Tomcast Studios, Dallas, Texas; Trout Recording, Brooklyn, New York
- Genre: Alternative rock, folk rock, jam rock, Southern rock
- Label: Fantasy/Brick Elephant
- Producer: Bryce Goggin, Edie Brickell & New Bohemians

Edie Brickell & New Bohemians chronology
Ghost of a Dog (1990)	Stranger Things (2006)	Rocket (2018)

Professional ratings
Review scores
Source	Rating
AllMusic	3.5/5 stars
PopMatters	7/10 stars

Stranger Things is the third album by American jam band Edie Brickell & New Bohemians, their first studio album in sixteen years. It was released on July 25, 2006, via Fantasy Records.

== Track listing ==
1. "Stranger Things" (Edie Brickell, Kenny Withrow, New Bohemians) - 3:20
2. "Oh My Soul" (Brickell, Withrow) - 2:52
3. "Buffalo Ghost" (Brickell, New Bohemians) - 4:36
4. "No Dinero" (Brickell, New Bohemians) - 5:30
5. "Early Morning" (Brickell, Withrow, New Bohemians) - 5:00
6. "Lover Take Me" (Brickell, Brad Houser, New Bohemians) - 4:23
7. "A Funny Thing" (Brickell, Withrow, New Bohemians) - 3:05
8. "Mainline Cherry" (Brandon Aly, Brickell, New Bohemians) - 4:14
9. "Long Lost Friend" (Brickell, Withrow, New Bohemians) - 3:13
10. "Wear You Down" (Brickell) - 4:12
11. "One Last Time" (Brickell, Withrow) - 4:00
12. "Spanish Style Guitar" (Brickell, Withrow, New Bohemians) - 5:28
13. "Elephants and Ants" (Brickell, Withrow) - 6:41

== Personnel ==
The New Bohemians

- Edie Brickell – lead vocals, electric guitar (10)
- Carter Albrecht – keyboards, guitars, harmonica, backing vocals
- Kenny Withrow – electric guitars, acoustic guitar, slide guitar, backing vocals
- Brad Houser – bass guitar, bass clarinet, baritone saxophone
- Brandon Aly – drums
- John Bush – percussion

Additional personnel

- Bryce Goggin – backing vocals (4)
- Adam Sacks – backing vocals (4)
- Tommy Bridwell – backing vocals (5)

== Production ==
- Edie Brickell & the New Bohemians – producers
- Bryce Goggin – producer, recording
- Tommy Bridwell – engineer, recording (5)
- Adam Sacks – assistant engineer
- S. Husky Hoskulds – mixing
- Gavin Lurssen – mastering
- Abbey Anna – art direction
- Andrew Pham – art direction, package design
- Edie Brickell – illustrations
- Carla Sacks – management

Studios

- Engineered at Tomcast Studios (Dallas, Texas).
- Recorded at Tomcast Studios and Trout Recording (Brooklyn, New York).
- Mixed at The Mute Matrix (Los Angeles, California).
- Mastered at The Mastering Lab (Ojai, California).
