= Pino Palladino =

Welsh bassist and record producer (born 1957)

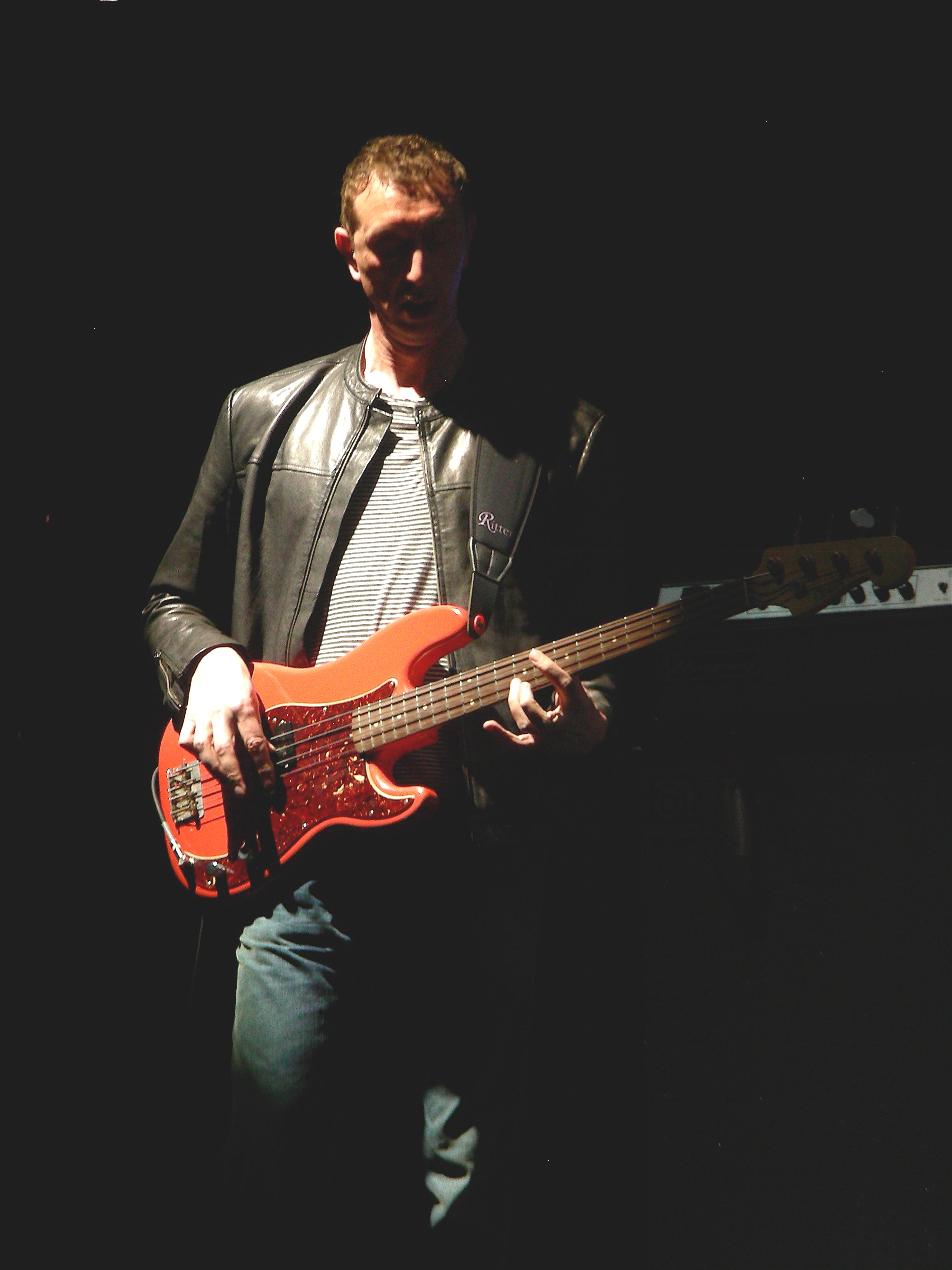
- Palladino performing with the Who in 2008

Background information
- Born: Giuseppe Henry Palladino; 17 October 1957 (age 68); Cardiff, Wales
- Origin: Finchley, London, England
- Genres: Rock; soul; funk; pop; new wave; jazz fusion
- Occupations: Bassist; songwriter; record producer
- Instrument: Bass guitar
- Years active: 1974–present
- Member of: The Vanguard; John Mayer Trio
- Formerly of: The Law; The Soultronics; The Gaddabouts

Giuseppe Henry "Pino" Palladino (born 17 October 1957) is a Welsh musician, songwriter, and record producer. A session bassist, he has played bass for a number of acts such as the Who, the John Mayer Trio, Gary Numan, Paul Young, Don Henley, David Gilmour, Go West, Tears for Fears, Nine Inch Nails, Jeff Beck, Adele and D'Angelo.

== Early life ==
The son of a Welsh mother and Italian father (from Campobasso), Giuseppe Henry Palladino was born in Cardiff on 17 October 1957. He was raised Catholic. He began playing guitar at age 14, due to the influence of his parish priest, and bass guitar at 17, after his priest took him to a Ralph McTell concert featuring bassist Danny Thompson. He bought his first fretless bass one year later, influenced by Motown music and playing mostly R&B, funk and reggae with a rock and roll backbeat. He was also drawn to jazz and took classical guitar lessons.

== Career ==
Palladino was influenced in his early years by Led Zeppelin and Yes and started a rock band. In 1982, Palladino recorded with Gary Numan on the album I, Assassin. Following this, he was asked to contribute to Paul Young's debut album. Young's cover version of "Wherever I Lay My Hat (That's My Home)" by Marvin Gaye became a hit in Europe, and Palladino subsequently joined Young's band, the Royal Family. He received offers to record with Joan Armatrading, Go West, and David Gilmour. He cites as early influences James Jamerson, Danny Thompson, and Norman Watt-Roy and also admires Jaco Pastorius, Stanley Clarke, Bootsy Collins, Larry Graham, Michael Henderson, Anthony Jackson, Marcus Miller, and Rocco Prestia.

In 1988-1989, Palladino played on the Don Henley album The End of the Innocence on three tracks, including the single "New York Minute". In 1989 he participating in the recording of Ryuichi Sakamoto's album Beauty, and was part of the lineup who played with the Japanese musician at the Hammersmith Odeon in 1991.

In 1990, he played on Mike Lindup's first solo album, Changes, with Dominic Miller on guitar and Manu Katché on drums. In 1991, he joined the Law with Paul Rodgers, formerly of Bad Company, and drummer Kenney Jones, who succeeded Keith Moon in the Who after Moon died, and recorded the album The Law.

In the 1990s, Palladino alternated between fretless bass and fretted 4-string and 6-string bass. He played with Melissa Etheridge, Richard Wright, Elton John, and Eric Clapton.

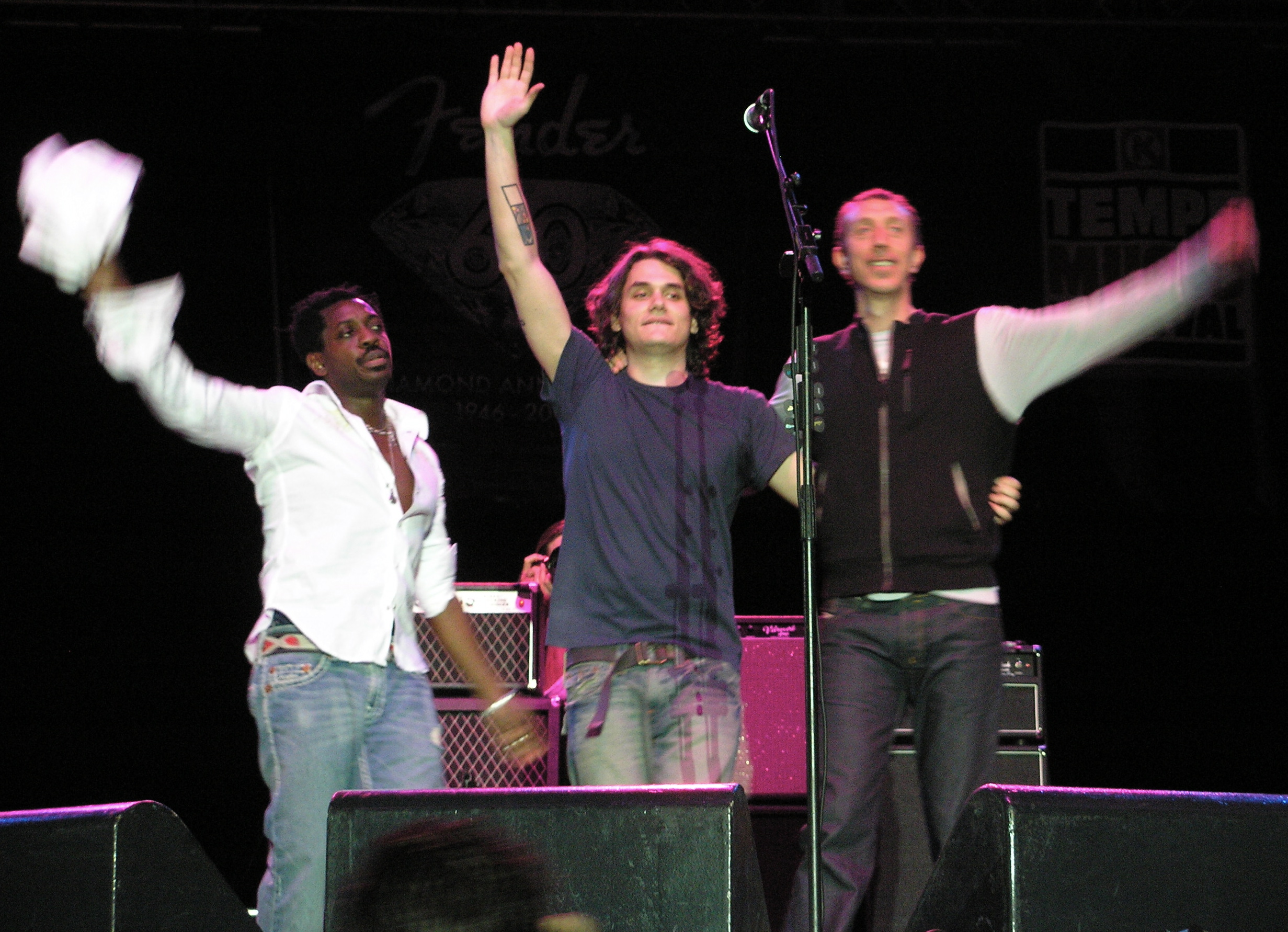
Left to right: Steve Jordan, John Mayer, and Pino Palladino

In 1999, he began working with Richard Ashcroft of the Verve on Ashcroft's debut solo album, Alone With Everybody.

Also in the late 1990s, Palladino and the neo-soul artist D'Angelo developed a connection over their mutual love of Motown and other classic soul music. Palladino then became active in the Soulquarians, playing on the majority of their discography and serving as a member of the Soultronics touring band that supported D'Angelo's Voodoo tour.

Palladino played with Simon and Garfunkel on their Old Friends reunion tour from 2003 to 2004.

After the Who's bassist John Entwistle died the night before the start of their first tour in two years, Palladino became the band's bass guitarist on tour. In 2006, he joined the remaining band members on their first album in twenty-four years, Endless Wire. He played with the Who at the Super Bowl XLIV half-time show in 2010 with Simon Townshend on guitar, Zak Starkey on drums, and John "Rabbit" Bundrick on keyboards. In 2012, Palladino toured with the Who on their Quadrophenia revival. He stopped touring with the Who in 2016. However, Palladino is still occasionally involved in studio sessions; he appeared on their 2019 album titled Who.

Palladino met Steve Jordan in the mid-1980s while both were working as session musicians the collaboration blossomed into a friendship. Jordan credits Palladino's apparent ability to "feel" changes in music, through melodies, basslines, and an embrace of genres of nearly every kind. According to Jordan, he had planned to meet up with John Mayer and Willie Weeks in January 2005 to perform Tsunami Aid: A Concert of Hope for victims of the tsunami that struck southeast Asia. Weeks was unable to make the performance, and Jordan suggested Palladino, who had heard some of Mayer's work and was willing to come. Beginning a set that included the Jimi Hendrix song "Bold as Love", the three found a chemistry together. They recorded an album and toured as a trio.

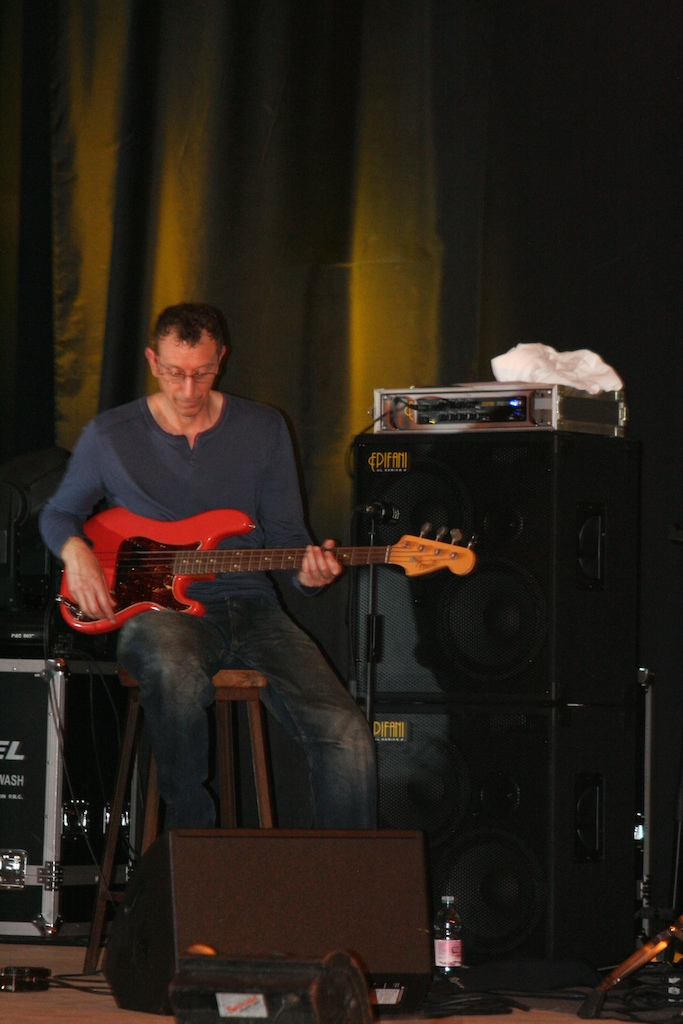
At the Amarone in Jazz festival, San Pietro in Cariano, Italy, September 2008

Palladino and Jordan released the album Try!, on 22 November 2005. The eleven-track live album includes cover versions of "Wait Until Tomorrow" by Jimi Hendrix and "I Got a Woman" by Ray Charles, two songs from Mayer's album Heavier Things, and new songs by Mayer. In addition, Mayer, Palladino, and Jordan are credited as songwriters on three songs: "Good Love Is on the Way", "Vultures", and "Try!". Palladino appeared on Mayer's third album Continuum, fourth album Battle Studies and seventh album The Search for Everything.

In March and April 2006, Palladino toured with Jeff Beck and played with J. J. Cale, and Eric Clapton on their 2006 album The Road to Escondido. In 2009, he formed a trio with keyboardist Philippe Saisse and Simon Phillips.

In January 2011, he entered the studio with D'Angelo to finish recording Black Messiah. In 2013, he played on the Nine Inch Nails album Hesitation Marks and was a member of the touring band. Additionally, he co-produced José James' album No Beginning No End (2013).

In 2024, he appeared on "II Most Wanted", the third single off of Beyoncé's album, Cowboy Carter; additionally, the song featured Miley Cyrus.

== Technique and equipment ==
Palladino is noted for his use of the fretless bass on many albums. While it was typical for a bass in a commercial track to have a rather generic sound and stay "playing the low notes", Palladino preferred a different sound, combining fretless tone with an octaver effect, and basslines that frequently added chords, lead lines, and counter-melodies in the higher range of the instrument. Typical of this style was his playing on Paul Young's "Wherever I Lay My Hat". His equipment at that time included a fretless 1979 Music Man StingRay Bass and Boss octave pedal (OC-2).

From the 1990s onward, Palladino has leaned mainly towards a Fender Precision Bass. He used his 1963 Sunburst Fender Precision on Voodoo, using heavy gauge LaBella strings (tuned down to DGCF), a foam mute, and an Ampeg B-15 amplifier. He has also played Fender Jaguar Bass, Lakland Jazz Bass, and Larry Graham Signature JJ-4B Bass.

The Fender Pino Palladino Signature Precision Bass is modeled after two of Pino's Fender Precision Basses. The body features faded fiesta red paint over desert sand paint, based on Palladino's 1961 Precision Bass, while the neck shape and round-lam rosewood fretboard are based on his 1963 sunburst Precision Bass.

In 2024, Ernie Ball Music Man released a Pino Palladino signature StingRay bass, closely replicating his 1979 sunburst fretless StingRay. It is available as a regular model, and a limited-edition "Icon" version, which is an exact replica of Palladino's original instrument that utilises new-old stock parts.

== Personal life ==
In 1992, Pino married Marilyn "Maz" Roberts, a member of Paul Young's vocal group, the Fabulous Wealthy Tarts. They have three children: Fabiana, Giancarla, and Rocco, who are all involved in the music industry.

== Discography ==
=== As leader ===
- Notes with Attachments (2021) (with Blake Mills)
- That Wasn't a Dream (2025) (with Blake Mills)

=== As session musician ===
With David Knopfler

- 1983 Release
- 1985 Behind the Lines
- 1987 Cut the Wire

With Don Henley

- 1984 Building the Perfect Beast
- 1989 The End of the Innocence

With Go West

- 1985 Go West
- 1987 Dancing on the Couch

With Elton John

- 1985 Ice on Fire
- 1992 The One

With John Mayer

- 2005 Try! (as the John Mayer Trio)
- 2006 Continuum
- 2009 Battle Studies
- 2017 The Search for Everything
- 2021 Sob Rock

With Jeff Beck

- 1999 Who Else!
- 2006 Official Bootleg USA '06
- 2010 Emotion & Commotion

With D'Angelo

- 2000 Voodoo
- 2014 Black Messiah

With The Gaddabouts

- 2011 The Gaddabouts
- 2012 Look Out Now!

With The Who

- 2006 Endless Wire
- 2014 Quadrophenia Live in London
- 2015 Live in Hyde Park
- 2017 Live at the Isle of Wight 2004 Festival
- 2019 WHO

With Paul Young

- 1983 No Parlez
- 1985 The Secret of Association
- 1986 Between Two Fires
- 1990 Other Voices
- 1993 The Crossing

With Eric Clapton

- 1989 Journeyman
- 1998 Pilgrim
- 2001 Reptile
- 2004 Me and Mr. Johnson
- 2005 Back Home
- 2006 The Road to Escondido (with J. J. Cale)

With Ed Sheeran

- 2017 ÷
- 2019 No. 6 Collaborations Project

With others

- 1981 Jools Holland, Jools Holland and His Millionaires
- 1982 Gary Numan, I, Assassin
- 1983 Nick Heyward, North of a Miracle
- 1984 David Gilmour, About Face
- 1984 Jools Holland, Jools Holland Meets Rock 'A' Boogie Billy
- 1985 Dream Academy The Dream Academy (various tracks)
- 1985 Pete Townshend, White City: A Novel
- 1986 Chris Eaton, Vision
- 1986 Chris De Burgh, Into the Light
- 1987 Pino Daniele, Bonne Soirée
- 1988 Joan Armatrading, The Shouting Stage
- 1989 Tears for Fears, The Seeds of Love
- 1989 Phil Collins, ...But Seriously
- 1989 Julia Fordham, Porcelain
- 1990 The Christians, Colour
- 1990 Joan Armatrading, Hearts and Flowers
- 1990 Oleta Adams, Circle of One
- 1990 Mike Lindup Changes
- 1990 Claudio Baglioni Oltre
- 1991 Julia Fordham, Swept
- 1992 Peter Cetera, World Falling Down
- 1993 Melissa Etheridge, Yes I Am
- 1993 David Crosby, Thousand Roads
- 1993 Michael McDonald, Blink of an Eye
- 1994 Bryan Ferry, Mamouna
- 1994 Carly Simon, Letters Never Sent
- 1995 Oleta Adams, Moving On
- 1995 Peter Cetera, One Clear Voice
- 1996 Richard Wright, Broken China
- 1996 Jimmy Nail, Crocodile Shoes II
- 1996 Duncan Sheik, Duncan Sheik
- 1997 Steve Lukather, Luke
- 1997 B.B. King, Deuces Wild
- 1997 Garland Jeffreys, Wildlife Dictionary
- 1998 Judie Tzuke, Secret Agent
- 1998 Richie Sambora, Undiscovered Soul
- 1999 Robbie McIntosh, Emotional Bends
- 1999 Tina Turner, Twenty Four Seven
- 1999 Beverley Craven, Mixed Emotions
- 2000 Richard Ashcroft, Alone With Everybody
- 2000 Gerry Rafferty, Another World
- 2000 Erykah Badu, Mama's Gun
- 2001 Nikka Costa, Everybody Got Their Something
- 2001 Rod Stewart, Human
- 2002 Ronan Keating, Destination
- 2003 Edie Brickell, Volcano
- 2004 Daniel Bedingfield, Second First Impression
- 2005 Charlotte Church, Tissues and Issues
- 2005 Will Young, Keep On
- 2006 Paul Simon, Surprise
- 2008 Amos Lee, Last Days at the Lodge
- 2009 Gerry Rafferty, Life Goes On
- 2010 Alain Clark, Colorblind
- 2011 Robbie Robertson, How to Become Clairvoyant
- 2011 Rebecca Ferguson, Heaven
- 2011 Garland Jeffreys, The King of in Between
- 2011 Adele, 21
- 2011 Kelly Clarkson, Stronger
- 2012 Mika, The Origin of Love
- 2013 José James, No Beginning No End
- 2013 Nine Inch Nails, Hesitation Marks
- 2015 Keith Richards, Crosseyed Heart
- 2015 The Corrs, White Light
- 2016 Keith Urban, Ripcord
- 2016 John Legend, Darkness and Light
- 2016 Corinne Bailey Rae, The Heart Speaks in Whispers
- 2018 Bahamas, Earthtones
- 2018 José James, Lean on Me
- 2018 Kimbra, Primal Heart
- 2018 Josh Groban, Bridges
- 2018 Chris Dave, Chris Dave and the Drumhedz
- 2018 Lionel Loueke, The Journey
- 2019 Jacob Collier, Djesse Vol. 2
- 2019 Harry Styles, Fine Line
- 2019 Rex Orange County, Pony
- 2019 Emeli Sandé, Real Life
- 2019 Robbie Robertson, Sinematic
- 2022 Maggie Rogers, Surrender
- 2024 Beyoncé, Cowboy Carter
- 2025 Dijon, Baby
