= The Heavy Circles =

American indie rock band

- Origin: New York, New York, United States
- Genres: Indie rock Indie pop
- Years active: 2008–present
- Label: Dynamite Child
- Members: Edie Brickell

The Heavy Circles is an American indie rock band featuring Edie Brickell and Harper Simon. The album features contributions from many guest musicians including Sean Lennon, Money Mark, Yuka Honda from the band Cibo Matto, Patrick Warren and Jeff Buckley/Rufus Wainwright drummer Matt Johnson.

On February 12, 2008, The Heavy Circles released their self-titled debut album on the indie rock label Dynamite Child. The album was released in the UK in April 2008.

The name "Heavy Circles" was originally taken by a Los Angeles-based band that featured Oscar Mitt on vocals, Charlie Campagna on electric guitar, Eric Potter on bass guitar, Ron Bartlett on drums. Mitt borrowed the name from a 1927 painting by Vasily Kandinsky. Members of The Heavy Circles admired the music of Jennifer Charles so it is possible that Charles may have thought to re-appropriate the name.

== Track listing ==
1. "Henri" - 2:47
2. "Better" - 3:10
3. "Ready to Play" - 3:45
4. "Confused" - 3:57
5. "Easier" - 4:31
6. "Maximo" - 3:07
7. "Wait and Wait" - 4:14
8. "Need a Friend" - 3:06
9. "Dynamite Child" - 1:45
10. "Oh Darling" - 3:52
