= Hunter and the Dog Star =

Studio album by Edie Brickell & New Bohemians
- Released: February 19, 2021
- Studio: Arlyn Studio, Austin, Texas
- Label: Shuffle
- Producer: Kyle Crusham

Edie Brickell & New Bohemians chronology
Rocket (2018)	Hunter and the Dog Star (2021)

Hunter and the Dog Star is the fifth studio album by Edie Brickell & New Bohemians, released in 2021.

== Reception ==
Writing for American Songwriter, Lee Zimmerman gave the album four out of five stars, and called it a "remarkably uplifting effort". In Forbes, Steve Baltin described it as "stellar" and "a smart, highly literate, enjoyable song cycle that goes on a full journey".

== Track listing ==
1. "Sleeve"
2. "Don't Get in the Bed Dirty"
3. "I Don't Know"
4. "Stubborn Love"
5. "Rough Beginnings"
6. "Tripwire"
7. "Horse's Mouth"
8. "I Found You"
9. "Miracles"
10. "Evidence"
11. "My Power"
