= The Gaddabouts (album) =

Studio album by The Gaddabouts
- Released: January 25, 2011
- Genre: Folk rock
- Length: 41:40
- Label: RacecarLOTTA Records
- Producer: Steve Gadd

The Gaddabouts chronology
The Gaddabouts (2011)	Look Out Now! (2012)

Professional ratings
Review scores
Source	Rating
AllMusic	3/5 stars

The Gaddabouts is the first album by The Gaddabouts, released in January 2011, in the same month that band vocalist Edie Brickell released her third solo album. The band consists of Edie Brickell, drummer Steve Gadd, guitarist Andy Fairweather Low and bass player Pino Palladino.

== Development ==
The group built on a foundation of demo sessions performed by Brickell and Gadd in 2000. When they continued with further sessions, they recruited Fairweather Low and Palladino. The musicians developed a groove, but due to conflicting touring schedules and family commitments, they shelved the project at the time. When the four musicians got back together in 2010, they used several of the songs they composed during the previous decade, and others they wrote and recorded during the current sessions. Brickell wrote some of the songs on the same day they were recorded, on the train ride into New York City. One of the songs, "Mad Dog", was recorded in one take live, which captured an energy that Brickell feels is missing in songs that take over 15 takes to capture.

== Track listing ==
All tracks are written by Edie Brickell

No.	Title	Length
1.	"Never So Far Away"	3:25
2.	"Let It Slide"	4:08
3.	"Remind Me"	3:05
4.	"My Heart"	5:07
5.	"They Say Everything"	2:39
6.	"Mad Dog"	3:01
7.	"Gonna Hold On"	3:24
8.	"Good Day"	2:27
9.	"Good for Me"	4:26
10.	"More Than Anybody"	4:40
11.	"Feelin' Better"	5:18
Total length:		42:45

== Personnel ==
The band

- Edie Brickell – vocals, guitar
- Steve Gadd – drums, percussion
- Andy Fairweather Low – vocals, electric guitar, acoustic guitar
- Pino Palladino – bass, guitar

Additional musicians

- Joey DeFrancesco – piano, organ, Rhodes piano, melodica, trumpet
- Gil Goldstein – accordion, Hammond B3 organ
- Ronnie Cuber – baritone saxophone
- Marcus Rojas – tuba
- Luisito Quintero – congas
- Dan Block – clarinet

Production

- Producer – Steve Gadd
- Engineer – Andy Smith
- Mixing – Andy Smith
- Recorded – Andy Smith
- Mastering – Greg Calbi
- Sequencing – Phil Ramone
- Second engineers – Christian Baker, Dan Bucchi, Mark Johnson, Craig Luchen, Claudius Mittendorfer, Neo Tanusakdi, Tyler van Dalen
- Instrument technician – Mike Burns
- CD Design – Amy Beth McNeely
- Cover painting – Jennifer Delilah
