= Static & Silence =

Studio album by the Sundays
- Released: 22 September 1997
- Genres: Indie pop; dream pop; jangle pop; folk
- Length: 38:46 (UK edition); 42:14 (US edition)
- Labels: Parlophone; Geffen
- Producers: David Gavurin; Harriet Wheeler

The Sundays chronology
Blind (1992)	Static & Silence (1997)

Singles from Static & Silence
- 1. "Summertime" Released: 8 September 1997; 2. "Cry" Released: 10 November 1997

Professional ratings
Review scores
Source	Rating
AllMusic	3/5 stars
Entertainment Weekly	A−
The Guardian	3/5 stars
Los Angeles Times	2.5/4 stars
NME	3/10
Pitchfork	8.8/10
Rolling Stone	3/5 stars
Select	4/5
The Times	8/10
USA Today	3/4 stars

Static & Silence is the third and final studio album by English alternative rock band The Sundays. It was released in the UK by Parlophone on 22 September 1997 and in the US by Geffen on 23 September 1997. The title is a quote from the album's final track, "Monochrome," and the album's cover photo refers to the subject of "Monochrome," the TV screening of the Apollo 11 Moon landing.

Guitarist and leader David Gavurin has said that by the time of the recording of Static & Silence, the band had mellowed somewhat with age. He and his wife, Harriet Wheeler, were influenced more by Van Morrison, who gave some songs on the album their folk-rock bent ("Folk Song" even quotes from Morrison's "And It Stoned Me"). The couple had also been listening to Frank Sinatra songs and 1960s French film music.

Kevin Jamieson, who performed some percussion work on the album, joined The Sundays as a backup guitarist during their UK and US album support tour. He is perhaps best known for his prior work as the lead singer for Jim Jiminee.

== Singles ==
Lead single "Summertime" charted at No. 15 in the UK Singles Chart, making it their highest-charting single in their home country, at No. 10 and 13 on the US Modern Rock and Adult Top 40 charts, respectively, and at No. 41 in Australia. The Second single, "Cry," peaked at No. 44 on the UK Singles Chart.

== Track listing ==
All songs written by David Gavurin and Harriet Wheeler.

UK version
No.	Title	Length
1.	"Summertime"	3:34
2.	"Homeward"	3:49
3.	"Folk Song"	3:04
4.	"She"	3:07
5.	"When I'm Thinking About You"	4:17
6.	"I Can't Wait"	2:23
7.	"Another Flavour"	3:18
8.	"Leave This City"	4:24
9.	"Your Eyes"	2:30
10.	"Cry"	4:05
11.	"Monochrome"	4:15

US version
No.	Title	Length
1.	"Summertime"	3:34
2.	"Homeward"	3:49
3.	"Folk Song"	3:04
4.	"She"	3:07
5.	"When I'm Thinking About You"	4:17
6.	"I Can't Wait"	2:23
7.	"Cry"	4:05
8.	"Another Flavour"	3:18
9.	"Leave This City"	4:24
10.	"Your Eyes"	2:30
11.	"So Much"	4:05
12.	"Monochrome"	4:15

Japan version bonus tracks
No.	Title	Length
12.	"Through The Dark" (B-side of "Cry")	4:25
13.	"Gone" (B-side of "Summertime")	3:53
14.	"Nothing Sweet" (B-side of "Summertime)	3:02

== Personnel ==
- Harriet Wheeler – vocals, string arrangements and orchestration, brass and flute orchestration
- David Gavurin – guitar, Hammond organ, piano, percussion, string arrangements and orchestration, brass and flute arrangements and orchestration
- Paul Brindley – bass
- Patrick Hannan – drums
- Dave Anderson – Hammond organ, piano
- Kev Jamieson – Hammond organ, piano
- Martin Ditcham – percussion
- Dave Pulfreman – percussion
- Audrey Riley – string arrangements and orchestration
- Martin Green – brass and flute arrangements and orchestration

== Charts ==
Chart performance for Static & Silence
Chart (1997)	Peak position
Australian Albums (ARIA)	45
New Zealand Albums (RMNZ)	33
UK Albums (Official Charts)	10
US Billboard 200	33
