= Shelley Nelson =

English singer and songwriter

Shelley Nelson is an English singer and songwriter from London, best known as the vocalist on the two top-20 hits by Tin Tin Out, "Here's Where the Story Ends" and "Sometimes", as well as the UK garage top-40 hit by Ed Case, "Something in Your Eyes". She has provided vocals on several songs by different artists, including a 2001 duet with Chris de Burgh, Two Sides to Every Story.

In 2018, Nelson recorded a new orchestral version of the K-Warren mix of "Something in Your Eyes" for the UK garage covers album Garage Classics with the House & Garage Orchestra. She also featured on another track on the album, a cover of the Doolally hit "Straight from the Heart".

== Discography ==
=== Charted singles ===
- Top of the World - with Dudearella (1996) - UK #83
- "Treat Infamy" (Alternative 7" and 12" mixes) - with Rest Assured (1998) - UK #14
- "Here's Where the Story Ends" - with Tin Tin Out (1998) - UK #7, UK Dance #5, SCO #10, U.S. Dance #15, ICE #21, NZ #45
- "Sometimes" - with Tin Tin Out (1998) - UK #20
- "Fall from Grace" (1999) - UK #90
- "Something in Your Eyes" - with Ed Case (2000) - UK #38, UK Dance #2
- "Two Sides to Every Story" - with Chris de Burgh (2001) - UK #172
