= Shooting Rubberbands at the Stars =

Studio album by Edie Brickell & New Bohemians
- Released: August 9, 1988
- Studios: Rockfield Studios (Rockfield, Wales)
- Genres: Alternative rock, jangle pop, folk rock
- Length: 48:22
- Label: Geffen
- Producer: Pat Moran

Edie Brickell & New Bohemians chronology
Shooting Rubberbands at the Stars (1988)	Ghost of a Dog (1990)

Shooting Rubberbands at the Stars is the debut studio album by American alternative rock band Edie Brickell & New Bohemians, released on August 9, 1988, by Geffen Records. The album went double platinum in the United States.

"What I Am" was the lead single and hit from the album, reaching No. 7 on the Billboard Hot 100. The follow-up single, "Circle", was about strained relationships. Although described by author Brent Mann as "the perfect follow up single to 'What I Am'" and which "had 'smash' written all over it", it stalled at No. 48 on the Billboard Hot 100 and fared slightly better on the Billboard Mainstream Rock chart, reaching No. 32. Cash Box said of "Circle" that "The key to this gentle song is Brickell’s breathy intensity. Supported by an acoustic-slanted track, she manages to sell the unusually dark lyric shadings." Another song from the album, "Little Miss S." was inspired by Edie Sedgwick and reached No. 38 on the Mainstream Rock chart and No. 14 on the Modern Rock Tracks chart.

== Reception ==
Professional ratings
Review scores
Source	Rating
AllMusic	4.5/5 stars
Q	4/5 stars
Rolling Stone	3/5 stars
The Village Voice	B−

"Shooting Rubberbands at the Stars is almost impossible to be cynical about (I tried)," remarked Time Out, "and the band are so likeable it's almost unreal."

== Track listing ==
Shooting Rubberbands at the Stars track listing
No.	Title	Writer(s)	Length
1.	"What I Am"	Edie Brickell, Kenny Withrow	4:54
2.	"Little Miss S."	Brickell, Withrow, Brad Houser, Brandon Aly, John Bush	3:37
3.	"Air of December"	Brickell, Withrow, Houser, Aly, Bush	5:54
4.	"The Wheel"	Brickell, Withrow, Houser, Aly, Bush	3:53
5.	"Love Like We Do"	Brickell	3:13
6.	"Circle"	Brickell, Withrow	3:11
7.	"Beat the Time"	Brickell, Withrow	2:58
8.	"She"	Brickell, Withrow	5:06
9.	"Nothing"	Brickell, Withrow, Houser, Aly, Bush	4:49
10.	"Now"	Brickell, Withrow, Houser, Aly, Bush	6:00
11.	"Keep Coming Back"	Brickell	2:42
12.	"I Do" (Hidden track)	Brickell	2:00

== Personnel ==
The New Bohemians

- Edie Brickell – vocals
- Kenny Withrow – guitars
- Brad Houser – bass
- Brandon Aly – drums
- John Bush – percussion

with

- Paul "Wix" Wickens – keyboards
- Robbie Blunt – guitars
- Chris Whitten – drums
- John Henry – backing vocals

Both Chris Whitten and Paul "Wix" Wickens were/are members of Paul McCartney's band; Whitten from 1989 to 1990 and Wickens from 1989–present.

== Production ==
- Pat Moran – producer, engineer
- George Marino – mastering at Sterling Sound (New York City, New York)
- Barry Diament – CD mastering at Barry Diament Mastering (New York City, New York)
- Gabrielle Raumberger – art coordinator
- Terry Robertson – CD design
- Edie Brickell – cover illustration
- Mark Abrahams – solo photography
- Bob Cook – band photography
- Tracks 6 & 8 published by Geffen Music-Withrow Publishing-Edie Brickell Songs.
- Tracks 11 & 12 published by Geffen Music-Edie Brickell Songs.
- All other tracks published by Geffen Music-Strangemind Productions-Enlightened Kitty-Withrow Publishing-Edie Brickell Songs.

== Charts ==
=== Weekly charts ===
Chart	Position
Australian Albums Chart	31
Austrian Albums Chart	12
Dutch Mega Albums Chart	33
German Media Control Albums Chart	29
Italian Albums Chart	5
New Zealand Albums Chart	10
UK Albums Chart	25
United States Billboard 200	4

=== Year-end charts ===
Chart (1989)	Position
Australian Albums Chart	81
Canadian Albums Chart	26
Italian Albums Chart	16
U.S. Billboard 200	18

=== Certifications ===
Region	Certification
United States (RIAA)	2× Platinum
