= Tenpenny Joke =

- Origin: Melbourne, Victoria, Australia
- Genres: Alternative rock
- Years active: 1997–2011
- Labels: Sing Sing/Shock; Promoting the Bands
- Past members: Anthony Casey; Brian Rimmer; Craig Boswell; Tim Kill; Keith Ratnan; Peter Coon; Julian Senserrick; Jay Pinfold; Daniel French; Matt Steadman; Phil Westrup

Tenpenny Joke were an Australian rock band, formed in 1997. They signed to Shock Records/Sing Sing Productions in 2004, and released their debut album, Ambush on all Sides in 2005, produced by Matt Voigt (The Living End, Kiss, Aaliyah). It was released internationally by BMG.

== History ==
Tenpenny Joke were formed on Melbourne's Mornington Peninsula in 1997. They issued their debut studio album, Ambush on all Sides, in September 2005 via Shock Records. It was recorded at Sing Sing Studios, Richmond during two sessions: one in November 2004 and the other in April 2005. By the time the album appeared the line-up was Craig "Boz" Boswell on drums, Anthony Casey on vocals, Peter Coon on guitars, Tim Kill on bass guitar and Brian Rimmer on vocals and guitar. In January 2006 Rimmer explained their sound to Australian Music Online's interviewer, "Melodic rock is probably the label that comes closest, but it has also been described as progressive and alternative." By May 2012 the group had disbanded, "the future of the band doesn't look too bright and according to their defunct website they are currently on hiatus."

== Touring ==
The band toured regularly around Australia, sharing the stage with acts such as Dallas Crane, End Of Fashion, Mandy Kane, Cosmic Nomads and Kisschasy. 2006 saw the band touring New Zealand with Ruptus Jack sponsored by Jägermeister. Tenpenny Joke began 2007 performing at the Rip Curl Pro Surf Festival in Bells Beach, Torquay.

TPJ have completed multiple tours of Australia promoting their debut album 'Ambush On All Sides', performing shows throughout Queensland, Sydney, Melbourne, Adelaide and Mount Hotham. In early 2006 the band performed in Mildura to launch the first issue of Forty 2, a new Mildura youth/arts magazine featuring TPJ on the cover.

== Radio ==
The band have been featured on Australian radio with their single She becoming one of Triple J presenter Rosie Beaton's picks for 2007. They also have been featured on the French webradio "Muzeeli".

Tenpenny Joke have also been featured regularly on 'Yellowbeat' radio in Tokyo (where Across The Ocean became a most-requested track) and have received airplay in the US, UK, Europe, New Zealand and parts of Asia. The album has also been featured on college radio in the US as well as on internet radio stations and podcasts worldwide.

== Film & Television ==
The 2010 German film "En Familie" (A Family) features Evil Things on the soundtrack. "Snow Job" - Australian film featuring Evil Things & Sirens on the soundtrack. Australian Surfing Life - Retail DVD (Australia) featuring Flood & Sirens as the soundtrack. I Surf: Issue 6 - Australian surfing magazine/DVD featuring Sense video. I Surf: Issue 3 - Australian surfing magazine/DVD featuring Flood & Sense as the soundtrack. Brazilian Surf - Retail DVD (Brazil) featuring She & Caroline as the soundtrack. Rage - Australia's longest running music video show has featured some of the bands videos.

== Live Shows ==
Tenpenny Joke were a regular on the Melbourne live circuit. The band have also performed in Queensland, New South Wales, Victoria, South Australia, Sydney, Brisbane, Mount Hotham, Auckland, Wellington, Christchurch, various regional areas and the Rip Curl Pro Surf Festival.

== Press Reviews ==
- "From the opening stereopanned hypnotic indian riffs, this album began to reel me in. Expertly executed performances from all. "She" - a great rock song sandwiched between the aforementioned 'indianisms' and a beautiful chamber orchestra finale! Then the straight-ahead riffing of "Sirens" gets serious. Comparisons to anyone do this band a disservice. "Sense", like "She" makes fine use of the stereo picture in its guitar and vocal work. Simple but highly effective. Great contemporary rock harmonies, just enough edge to the singer's vocals - which are inherently listenable. You get the feeling that this band's creative well runneth over. A truly great rock album, by anyone's standards." - Kevin Moore, Jamendo UK.
- "Excellent music: vocals, instrumentation (especially the guitars), production ...all is superb. Recalls the glory days of Alice in Chains. You've just gotten yourself a new fan." Peter Greenway, Pro Music Reviewer, Broadjam USA
- "The philosophy of Tenpenny Joke is deceptively simple - hit songs, and more of them." Damon Carrol, Triple R Radio

Garageband.com Awards:

- Track of the Day on 1, Sep2005 in Alternative Rock
- Track of the Day on 16, Sep2005 in Rock
- Track Of The Week on 31, Jul2006 in Alternative Rock
- Track Of The Week on 28, Aug2006 in Rock
- No. 18 Best Guitars in Alternative Rock, all-time
- No. 19 Best Production in Alternative Rock, all-time
- Best Male Vocals in Alternative Rock, week of 16, Oct2006
- Best Guitars in Alternative Rock, week of 22, Aug2005
- Best Guitars in Alternative Rock, week of 29, Aug2005
- Best Guitars in Alternative Rock, week of 9, Oct2006
- Best Drums overall, week of 29, Aug2005
- Best Drums in Alternative Rock, week of 22, Aug2005
- Best Drums in Alternative Rock, week of 29, Aug2005
- Best Drums in Alternative Rock, week of 9, Oct2006
- Best Programming in Alternative Rock, week of 22, Aug2005
- Best Production in Alternative Rock, week of 22, Aug2005
- Best Production in Alternative Rock, week of 29, Aug2005
- Best Production in Alternative Rock, week of 16, Oct2006
- Best Lyrics in Alternative Rock, week of 9, Oct2006
- Best Melody in Alternative Rock, week of 9, Oct2006
- Best Melody in Alternative Rock, week of 16, Oct2006
- Best Beat in Alternative Rock, week of 22, Aug2005
- Best Beat in Alternative Rock, week of 9, Oct2006
- Most Original in Alternative Rock, week of 22, Aug2005
- Most Original in Alternative Rock, week of 9, Oct2006 Rocking Track overall, week of 22, Aug2005
- Most Original in Alternative Rock, week of 9, Oct2006
- Rocking Track overall, week of 22, Aug2005
- Rocking Track in Alternative Rock, week of 22, Aug2005
- Rocking Track in Alternative Rock, week of 12, Sep2005
- Grooviest Rhythm in Alternative Rock, week of 9, Oct2006

== Discography ==
=== Albums ===
- Ambush on all Sides (5 September 2005): – Shock Records (SHK SS001)

=== EPs ===
- Even Harbour (2003)
- Tenpenny Joke (self-titled) (2000)

=== Videos ===
Tenpenny Jokes videos are available on YouTube.

- Black Satellite (2007)
- Don't Go (2007)
- Sirens (2006)
- She (2005)
- Sense (2004)
- Even Harbour (2003)
- Caroline (2008)
