= What I Am =

1988 single by Edie Brickell & New Bohemians

Single by Edie Brickell & New Bohemians

from the album Shooting Rubberbands at the Stars
- B-side: "I Do"; "Walk on the Wild Side"
- Released: November 1, 1988
- Studio: Rockfield (Wales, UK)
- Length: 4:54 (album version); 3:40 (single edit)
- Label: Geffen
- Songwriters: Edie Brickell; Kenny Withrow
- Producer: Pat Moran

Edie Brickell & New Bohemians singles chronology
"What I Am" (1988)	"Circle" (1988)

Music video
- "What I Am" on YouTube

"What I Am" is a song written by Edie Brickell and Kenny Withrow and recorded by Edie Brickell & New Bohemians for their debut album, Shooting Rubberbands at the Stars (1988). The song is highlighted by a guitar solo that notably features an envelope filter. It peaked at No. 7 on the US Billboard Hot 100, topped the Canadian RPM 100 Singles chart, and became a top-20 hit in Australia and New Zealand. "What I Am" was ranked No. 23 on VH1's list of the "100 Greatest One-Hit Wonders of the 80s".

English music duo Tin Tin Out collaborated with Spice Girl Emma Bunton to release a cover of "What I Am" in November 1999. This version became the more successful one in the UK, peaking at No. 2 on the UK Singles Chart and receiving a silver certification from the British Phonographic Industry.

== Background ==
Edie Brickell said:

The lyrics came from my one elective in my first year in college, world religions. From the time I could first think, I wondered, What does the rest of the world think? I know what these Texas folks think, but what's going on in the rest of the world? So I took this world religions class, and I was immediately annoyed at the chatter going on in the classroom. To adopt behaviors, to adopt some sort of dogma, I felt defeated the purpose of evolution. That song just blossomed from irritation.

On the "choke me in the shallow water" lyric, she said, "That's the part that was irritating about the class. Everybody was getting so deep in terms of making things up—'Does this mean this and does that mean that?' I was just irritated, like, just kill me now before I get out there and lose myself and my sense of who I am."

== Composition ==
"What I Am" is written in the key of B minor in 4/4 time with a tempo of 89 beats per minute. The song follows a chord progression of Bsus2–Dsus2–Asus2, and the vocals span from G_{3} to B_{4}.

== Critical reception ==
Betty Page from Record Mirror wrote, "Like so many other singles this week, this is pleasantly quirky but not terribly inspiring. Edie's yet another female singer/songstress who sings and strums a guitar in a rustic fashion which makes you forget what the song sounds like before it's finished." Cash Box called it "one of the catchiest, anti-philosophical, tongue-in-cheek ditties since Peggy Lee's 'Is That All There Is?'"

== Track listings ==
US, European, and Australian 7-inch single; US cassette single

A. "What I Am" (LP version) – 4:54
B. "I Do" (LP version) – 2:00

Canadian and UK 7-inch single

A. "What I Am" (edit) – 3:43
B. "I Do" (LP version) – 2:00

12-inch and UK mini-CD single

1. "What I Am" (LP version)
2. "I Do" (LP version)
3. "Walk on the Wild Side" – 5:52

== Personnel ==
New Bohemians

- Edie Brickell – vocals
- Kenny Withrow – guitar
- Brad Houser – bass guitar
- Brandon Aly – drums
- John Bush – percussion

Additional personnel

- Robbie Blunt – guitar
- Chris Whitten – drums
- Paul "Wix" Wickens – keyboards
- John Henry – background vocals

== Charts ==
=== Weekly charts ===
Chart (1988–1990)	Peak position
Australia (ARIA)	18
Canada Top Singles (RPM)	1
Canada Retail Singles (RPM)	4
Europe (Eurochart Hot 100)	90
Ireland (IRMA)	23
Italy (Musica e dischi)	14
Italy Airplay (Music & Media)	7
New Zealand (Recorded Music NZ)	11
UK Singles (Official Charts)	31
UK Airplay (Music & Media)	15
US Billboard Hot 100	7
US Adult Contemporary (Billboard)	30
US Alternative Airplay (Billboard)	4
US Mainstream Rock (Billboard)	9
US Cash Box Top 100	6

=== Year-end charts ===
Chart (1989)	Position
Brazil (Crowley)	90
Canada Top Singles (RPM)	37
US Billboard Hot 100	84

== Release history ==
Region	Date	Format(s)	Label(s)	Ref(s).
United States	November 1, 1988	7-inch vinyl; cassette	Geffen	
United Kingdom	January 16, 1989	7-inch vinyl; 12-inch vinyl	Geffen	
Japan	February 10, 1989	Mini-CD	Geffen	
United Kingdom	February 20, 1989	7-inch vinyl box set; mini-CD	Geffen	

== Tin Tin Out and Emma Bunton version ==
"What I Am"

Single by Tin Tin Out and Emma Bunton

from the album Eleven to Fly
- B-side: "Weird (Save Yourself)"
- Released: November 1, 1999
- Recorded: June 1999
- Studio: Sarm West (London, England)
- Length: 3:54
- Label: Virgin; VC
- Songwriters: Edie Brickell; Kenny Withrow
- Producer: Tin Tin Out

Tin Tin Out singles chronology
"Eleven to Fly" (1999)	"What I Am" (1999)	"Anybody's Guess" (2000)

Emma Bunton singles chronology
"What I Am" (1999)	"What Took You So Long?" (2001)

Audio
- "What I Am" on YouTube

The song was covered by English electronic music duo Tin Tin Out and Spice Girls singer Emma Bunton. It was released on November 1, 1999, as the second single from Tin Tin Out's second studio album, Eleven to Fly (1999). It also appeared on Bunton's debut solo album, A Girl Like Me (2001). Bunton recorded her vocals at London's Sarm West Studios in June 1999. The collaboration was the first release for Bunton to appear as a solo artist.

Tin Tin Out and Bunton's version debuted and peaked at No. 2 on the UK Singles Chart, 29 places higher than the original version 11 years previously. It sold 106,300 copies during its first week of release and has sold over 234,000 copies in the UK. "What I Am" was the UK's 88th-best-selling single of 1999.

=== Track listings ===
Standard CD and UK cassette single

1. "What I Am" (radio version)
2. "What I Am" (Gangstarr remix)
3. "Weird (Save Yourself)" (featuring Wendy Page)

UK 12-inch single

A1. "T.W.M." (DJ Jam X & De Leon remix)
B1. "What I Am" (Gangstarr remix)
B2. "What I Am" (Groove Chronicles remix)

European CD single

1. "What I Am" (radio version)
2. "What I Am" (Gangstarr remix)

=== Personnel ===
Personnel are taken from the UK CD single liner notes.

- Edie Brickell – writing
- Kenny Withrow – writing
- Emma Bunton – vocals
- John Jorgenson – guitars
- Lindsay Edwards – guitars, keyboards
- Marcus Cliffe – bass
- Preston Heyman – percussion
- Tin Tin Out – production
- Stylorouge – design
- Rankin – photography

=== Charts ===
==== Weekly charts ====
Chart (1999–2000)	Peak position
Australia (ARIA)	65
Europe (Eurochart Hot 100)	13
France (SNEP)	75
Germany (GfK)	81
Iceland (Íslenski Listinn Topp 40)	18
Ireland (IRMA)	14
Netherlands (Dutch Top 40 Tipparade)	20
Netherlands (Single Top 100)	94
New Zealand (Recorded Music NZ)	48
Scotland Singles (Official Charts)	10
Sweden (Sverigetopplistan)	52
UK Singles (Official Charts)	2
UK Airplay (Music Week)	6

==== Year-end charts ====
Chart (1999)	Position
UK Singles (OCC)	88

=== Certifications and sales ===
Region	Certification	Certified units/sales
United Kingdom (BPI)	Silver	234,000

=== Release history ===
Region	Date	Format(s)	Label(s)	Ref.
United Kingdom	November 1, 1999	12-inch vinyl; CD; cassette	Virgin; VC	
New Zealand	December 13, 1999	CD; cassette	Virgin; VC	
