= Carter Albrecht =

American musician

Jeffrey Carter Albrecht (23 June 1973 – 3 September 2007) was an American musician best known for his keyboard and guitar work in Edie Brickell & New Bohemians.

== Biography ==
Originally from Derby, Kansas and a 1995 graduate of Southern Methodist University with a degree in piano performance, Albrecht was a pianist with the Dallas Symphony Orchestra and taught piano in the mid-1990s.

== Career ==
A member of the Dallas band Sorta, Albrecht played keyboards, guitar, and provided vocals. Albrecht also fronted his own popular Dallas band, Sparrows, which included Ward Williams and Danny Balis (also of Sorta), Bryan Wakeland (Polyphonic Spree), Mike Daane (Andy Timmons Band), and later on Brant Cole and Dave Monsey (Fiona Apple). Sparrows released two critically acclaimed albums, Rock and Roll Days (2002) and Snowflakes (2004) before disbanding in 2005. Prior to Sparrows, Albrecht played guitar in another popular local band, The Limes, which also included his friend Ward Williams on bass and Joey Shanks (Slider Pines) on guitar and vocals.

Albrecht made guest appearances on several albums recorded in Dallas in the last few years. He was putting the final touches on his first solo effort, Jesus is Alive...and Living in London at the time of his death. The album was approximately 75% complete at the time. With financial assistance from Edie Brickell, the material was mastered and finally released in February 2009.

== Death ==
In the pre-dawn hours of 3 September 2007, Albrecht was shot and killed by his girlfriend's neighbor. After having some drinks with his girlfriend Ryann Rathbone at a Dallas bar, Albrecht became intoxicated. Rathbone drove him to her house, and they both took a dose of Chantix (a drug to break nicotine addiction). A short while later, Albrecht began speaking incoherently, broke a drinking glass on a table, and hit Rathbone several times, something he had never done before. She ran outside, and Albrecht followed. Rathbone re-entered her home and locked the doors behind her. Albrecht yelled and pounded on her front door in an unsuccessful attempt to reenter her house.

At this point, Albrecht went into Rathbone's neighbor's backyard, and he and his wife were awakened by the loud pounding and yelling at their back door. Albrecht was told to stop, but he did not; Rathbone's neighbor then says he fired a "warning shot" through the door. The door was made of thick, opaque glass, and the porch was well lit. The shot hit the 6' 5" Albrecht in the head, and he died at the scene. No charges were filed. The autopsy report indicated Albrecht had a blood alcohol content of 0.29 g/dl (grams/deciliter), more than three times the legal driving limit in Texas of 0.08 g/dl, when he was shot.

People close to Albrecht state that his actions prior to the shooting were atypical, even after having had too much to drink, and that his behavior may have been affected by his use of the prescription drug Chantix, which he was taking to help him stop smoking. Addiction expert Dr. Bryon Adinoff considers that the interaction of Chantix with the alcohol he consumed that evening might have been a factor.
