= The Sundays =

English rock band (1988–1997)

- The Sundays c. 1990; From left to right: Patrick Hannan, Harriet Wheeler, Paul Brindley, and David Gavurin

Background information
- Origin: Bristol, England
- Genres: Alternative rock; dream pop; jangle pop; indie pop
- Years active: 1988–1997
- Labels: Rough Trade; Geffen; Parlophone
- Past members: David Gavurin; Harriet Wheeler; Patrick Hannan; Paul Brindley; Lindsay Jamieson

The Sundays were an English alternative rock band formed in Bristol in 1988. The band's lineup consisted of lead vocalist Harriet Wheeler, guitarist David Gavurin, bassist Paul Brindley, and drummer Patrick Hannan. Their music combined jangling guitar arrangements with Wheeler's distinctive vocals, drawing on elements of dream pop and indie pop.

Wheeler and Gavurin met while attending the University of Bristol and formed the band with Brindley and Hannan in 1988. After signing with Rough Trade Records, The Sundays released their debut single "Can't Be Sure" in 1989. Their first album, Reading, Writing and Arithmetic (1990), reached number four on the UK Albums Chart. The album's lead single, "Here's Where the Story Ends", topped the United States Billboard Modern Rock Tracks chart.

The Sundays' next single, "Goodbye", released in 1992. The band's second album, Blind, arrived the same year, and reached the UK top 15. The single "Love" reached number 2 on the US Billboard Modern Rock Tracks chart. Their third album, Static & Silence, was released in 1997 and included "Summertime", which reached the UK top 15. The Sundays subsequently ceased releasing new music, although later interviews indicated that Wheeler and Gavurin had continued writing and recording together.

== History ==
=== 1988: Formation ===
The Sundays formed in 1988.

Vocalist Harriet Wheeler and guitarist David Gavurin had met as students at Bristol University in the mid-1980s. Wheeler was from Reading, the daughter of an architect and a teacher, and studied English literature. Gavurin was from Wembley and actively pursued a degree in the Romance languages, particularly French and Spanish. The two fell in love and began living together. Following graduation, they wrote music in their free time while collecting unemployment benefits. Previously, Wheeler had played gigs with Cruel Shoes, an early incarnation of the band Jim Jiminee; otherwise, the couple had no musical background. Commenting on his desire to compose, Gavurin said, "It was something I'd always wanted to do, although I never wanted to be in a band when I was younger, like many kids do. It just dawned on me gradually." Wheeler displayed similar feelings: "There was never a time I wanted to be incredibly famous, or in a pop group," she said. "It just seemed a great thing to do to spend time working on something that's your own."

After the couple completed several songs – and moved to London – they enlisted the support of bassist Paul Brindley and drummer Patrick Hannan, who had also attended Bristol University. Hannan's brother, Nick, had also been a member of Jim Jiminee, which briefly featured Wheeler as vocalist (see paragraph above). The band chose the name "The Sundays" as it was the only one everyone could agree upon. Demo tapes were sent out to several London clubs after the group felt energized by their efforts; Gavurin stated in a Rolling Stone interview that "by the end of the year we were thinking, 'Hang on a minute, some of this [music] is good!'" Responses to the tape were enthusiastic and an employee at Vertigo Club offered the band an opening slot for an upcoming show in August 1988. "By chance there were three reviewers from the top music papers there," said Wheeler. "They were supposed to review the main band, but instead they wrote about us." The group subsequently became the focus of a record label bidding war. They eventually signed with Rough Trade Records and had a distribution deal signed for the United States with DGC Records.

=== 1989–1990: Reading, Writing and Arithmetic ===
The Sundays released their first single "Can't Be Sure" in January 1989. It topped the British indie charts and received acclaim as one of the best singles of 1989. The group performed three songs in a session with popular disc jockey John Peel. These songs would later turn up on their debut album, Reading, Writing and Arithmetic. The group worked on their debut for over a year. "A lot of bands who get signed, who have been playing the circuit for years, have 30 songs for the first album," said Gavurin. "But we didn't have enough for our first album, let alone our second. We can't write to deadline. You can't force a whole load of songs out quickly." Asked whether the band felt pressured when working on the album, Wheeler responded, "No, because to start off with, we're far more critical of ourselves than anyone else, and that's more a concern to us than what the press think." Gavurin also commented: "The main pressure we felt was with the single, and even then, we thought, well, they're either going to like it or they're not, and there's not much we can do to influence that."

Reading, Writing and Arithmetic was released in January 1990 and became a commercial success, reaching number 4 on the UK charts and peaking at number 39 on the Billboard 200 in the United States. It went on to sell over half a million copies worldwide. Its distinct Englishness in lyrics, augmented by Harriet Wheeler's accent, alongside their lighter-than-air guitar pop, influenced the nascent Britpop scene, notably impacting bands like Sleeper. The hit single "Here's Where the Story Ends" also gained considerable success in the USA, propelled by extensive radio play and MTV rotation. It was also on the 1994 "Blown Away" motion picture soundtrack. The Sundays devoted nearly a year to an "exhausting" promotional tour, which encompassed America, Europe, and Japan. The tour was considered successful, although it was not without some mishaps; a London show had to be rescheduled due to Wheeler losing her voice and the group experienced some amusement when a Dallas, Texas, show was advertised with the slogan "See The Sundays on Sunday with ice-cream sundaes".

=== 1991–1993: Blind ===
The band experienced some hardships leading up to the recording of their second album. In 1991 Rough Trade Records went bankrupt, which caused the band to sign with Parlophone Records in the UK. Their debut went out of print in the UK and would stay that way until 1996. Constant touring coupled with their decision to manage themselves hampered the group's creative output, which was already slow due to Gavurin and Wheeler, the main songwriters, "being chained by pokiness and perfectionism when it [came] to writing and recording music." Additionally, the band kept a "low public profile", which fuelled rumours that the group had disbanded. The Sundays eventually released a new single, "Goodbye", a minor hit, in Autumn 1992. The release came almost three years after their last UK show. The "Goodbye" B-side, a cover of The Rolling Stones' "Wild Horses", also appeared on the US release of Blind as well as in the movie Fear (1996), on the 1999 soundtrack album for the popular television series Buffy the Vampire Slayer, and in the episode 01x01 of the series Friends from College (2017).

Their next album, entitled Blind, was finally released in October 1992. The album experienced commercial success similar to their debut when it peaked at number 103 on the Billboard 200, and sold nearly half a million copies. Critical reception was also positive, but some critics thought the album lacked the quality songwriting of its predecessor. In a review for Time in January 1993, the magazine praised Wheeler's vocals and Gavurin's compositions, describing the album's guitar-led arrangements as an effective backdrop of Wheeler's singing. Despite Blind's initial appeal with audiences, it drifted off the charts by the summer of 1993. The Sundays toured Britain in the winter of 1992. The shows were "rapturously received by fans starved of fresh product or gigs." An American tour was greeted with sold-out shows. Gavurin explained that they weren't necessarily attempting to promote the new album: "A lot of people didn't see us the first time we played over here, and they want to hear earlier material. So we're playing half and half." In the end, the tour was cut short in light of exhaustion and homesickness.

During a performance at the Academy in New York City on February 25, 1993, the band played a set drawing primarily from Reading, Writing, and Arithmetic, alongside songs from Blind. Rolling Stone journalist Kara Manning wrote that the performance was characterized by Wheeler's understated stage presence and the interplay between her vocals and Gavurin's guitar. For their second encore, Wheeler and Gavurin performed an untitled and unreleased acoustic duet.

=== 1994–1997: Static & Silence ===
The band holidayed in Thailand and, upon returning to England, "put their music career on the back burner for a time." During this time the only appearance of the band was their cover of "Wild Horses" by The Rolling Stones appearing in a 1994 American Budweiser television commercial. Gavurin and Wheeler expressed a desire to settle down. Wheeler gave birth to the couple's daughter, Billie, in March 1995. They also built a recording studio in their home, not only to save on the cost of renting a studio, but also to expand their creative freedoms. Their third, and most recent album, Static & Silence, was released to mixed reviews in September 1997, a full five years after Blind. Although the band retained much of the sound developed on their previous albums, they added horns to several tracks. In a review for Rolling Stone, Jill Hamilton described the album's songs as generally gentle, highlighting the pairing of David Gavurin's guitars with Harriet Wheeler's vocals. The album was not as successful as Reading, Writing and Arithmetic; however, the single "Summertime" became their most successful hit to date on the UK chart and achieved a top 10 spot on the US Alternative Rock chart. In an interview with Billboard, Wheeler and Gavurin explained that the song was inspired by friends who had joined a dating service and described it as a tongue-in-cheek examination of the unrealistic expectations surrounding romantic relationships. It was The Sundays' third most successful single in the US, behind "Here's Where the Story Ends" (which made it to number 1 on the US Alternative Rock chart) and "Love" (which made it to number 2).

As of 2026, the band have not released any music since 1997.

=== 2014: Possible return ===
In April 2014, Adam Pitluk, the editor of American Airlines' magazine American Way, tracked down and conducted an interview with Wheeler and Gavurin in which he put forward the idea of a reunion. They responded, "First let's see if the music we’re currently writing ever sees the light of day, and then we can get on to the enjoyable globe-trotting-meets-concert-planning stage."

On 10 October 2014, during an interview on BBC Radio 6 Music's Radcliffe & Maconie radio programme, David Baddiel described Dave Gavurin as his "oldest mate" and stated that "they [Dave and Harriet] are doing music, but whether they ever put that out there, I’ve no idea. They're the most paranoid people about actually putting stuff out there".

In an interview with the C86 Show Podcast released on August 18, 2020, Patrick Hannan revealed that Wheeler and Gavurin had "never stopped making music" and that he had played drums on a number of their tracks. Hannan added that these recordings may never be released.

== Band members ==
- Paul Brindley – bass (1988–1997)
- David Gavurin – guitars, Hammond organ, piano, percussion (1988–1997)
- Patrick (Patch) Hannan – drums, percussion (1988–1997)
- Harriet Wheeler – lead vocals (1988–1997)
- Lindsay Jamieson – tambourine (1990–1992)

== Discography ==
=== Studio albums ===
Year	Details	Peak chart positions					Certifications (sales thresholds)
Year	Details	UK	AUS	NED	NZ	US	Certifications (sales thresholds)
1990	Reading, Writing and Arithmetic: Released: 15 January 1990; Label: Rough Trade	4	40	56	37	39	BPI: Gold; RIAA: Gold
1992	Blind: Released: 19 October 1992; Label: Parlophone/Geffen	15	78	—	—	103	RIAA: Gold
1997	Static & Silence: Released: 22 September 1997; Label: Parlophone/Geffen	10	45	—	33	33	BPI: Silver
"—" denotes releases that did not chart or were not released.

=== Singles ===
Year	Single	Peak chart positions					Album
Year	Single	UK	AUS	CAN	US Air	US Alt	Album
1989	"Can't Be Sure"	45	74	—	—	—	Reading, Writing and Arithmetic
1990	"Here's Where the Story Ends"	—	123	—	—	1	Reading, Writing and Arithmetic
1992	"Love"	—	—	—	—	2	Blind
1992	"Goodbye"	27	175	—	—	11	Blind
1997	"Summertime"	15	41	48	50	10	Static & Silence
1997	"Cry"	43	—	—	—	—	Static & Silence
"—" denotes releases that did not chart or were not released.

=== B-sides / unreleased songs ===
- "Black Sessions" (Live 1992 - Album) (French radio show - France Inter)
- "Can't Be Sure" [demo] (b-side of "Cry")
- "Don't Tell Your Mother" (b-side of "Can't Be Sure", eventually appearing also on DGC Rarities Vol. 1)
- "Gone" (b-side of "Summertime")
- "Here's Where the Story Ends" [live] (from the Black Session - b-side of "Wild Horses" US cassette single and b-side of "Summertime")
- "I Kicked a Boy" (b-side of "Can't Be Sure", released on Reading, Writing and Arithmetic)
- "Life Goes On" (b-side of "Cry")
- "Noise" (b-side of "Goodbye")
- "Nothing Sweet" (b-side of "Summertime")
- "Skin & Bones" [live] (from the Peel Session - b-side of "Summertime")
- "Something More" (unreleased)
- "So Much" (only on the US version of Static & Silence)
- "Through the Dark" (b-side of "Cry")
- "Turkish" (only performed live, and at almost every concert on the Blind and Static & Silence tours)
- "Wild Horses" (b-side of "Goodbye", appearing also on US copies of Blind)
- "You're Not the Only One I Know" [demo] (b-side of "Cry")

=== Music videos ===
Year	Title	Director	Album
1990	"Can't Be Sure"	Peter Scammell	Reading, Writing and Arithmetic
1990	"Here's Where the Story Ends"	Peter Scammell	Reading, Writing and Arithmetic
1990	"Joy"	Peter Scammell	Reading, Writing and Arithmetic
1992	"Love"	Unknown	Blind
1992	"Goodbye"	Peter Scammell	Blind
1993	"Wild Horses"	Josh Taft	Blind
1997	"Summertime"	Pedro Romhanyi	Static & Silence
