= Edie Brickell =

American singer-songwriter (born 1966)

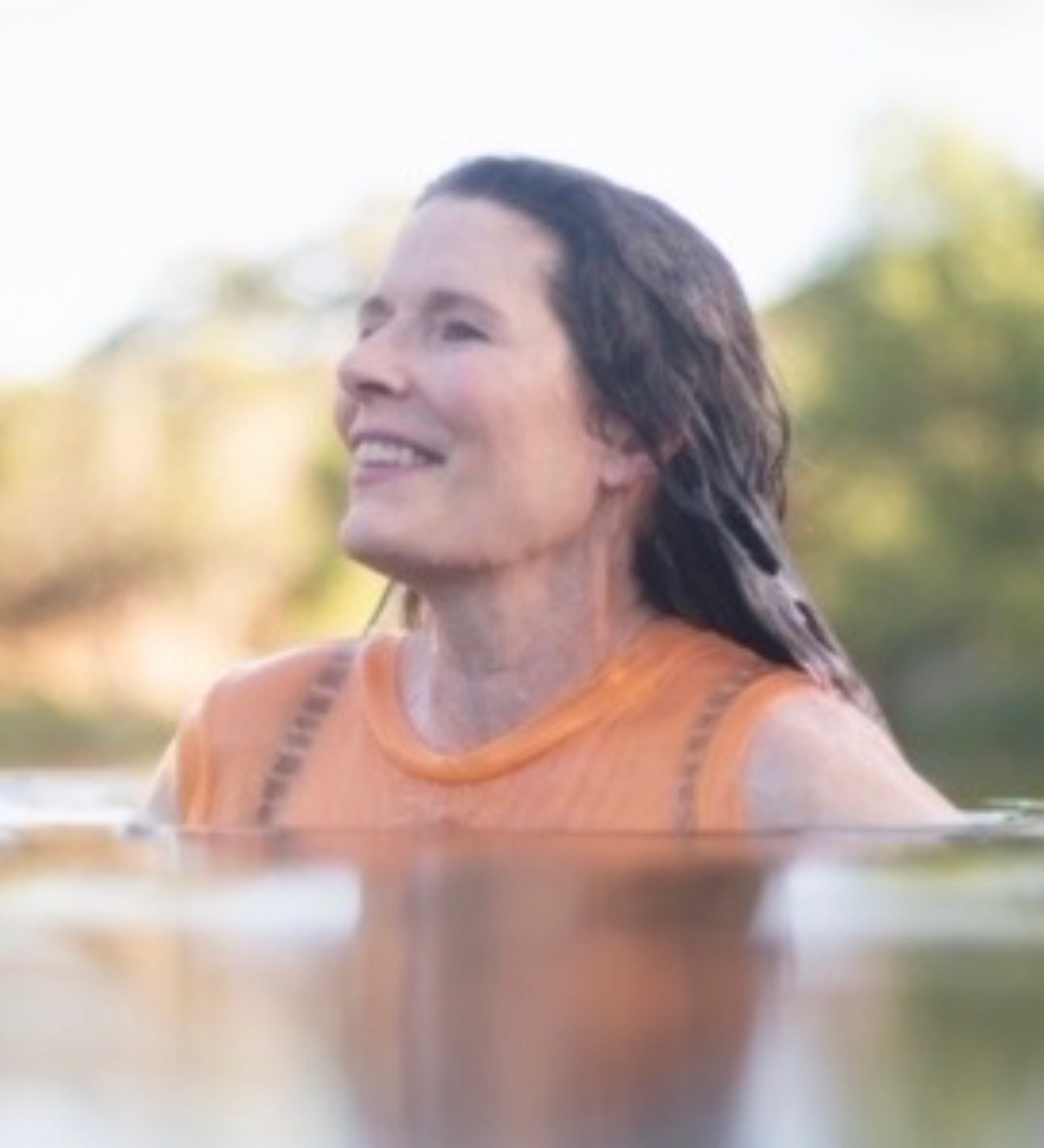

Background information
- Born: Edie Arlisa Brickell; March 10, 1966 (age 60); Dallas, Texas, U.S.
- Genres: Alternative rock, folk rock, jam rock, jangle pop, neo-psychedelia, bluegrass
- Occupations: Singer-songwriter, guitarist
- Instruments: Vocals, guitar
- Years active: 1985–present
- Label: Geffen
- Member of: Edie Brickell & New Bohemians; The Heavy Circles; Heavy MakeUp; The Gaddabouts; World Famous Pets
- Spouse: Paul Simon (m. 1992)

Edie Arlisa Brickell (born March 10, 1966) is an American singer-songwriter widely known for 1988's Shooting Rubberbands at the Stars, the debut album by Edie Brickell & New Bohemians, which went to No. 4 on the Billboard albums chart. She is married to singer-songwriter Paul Simon.

== Early life ==
Brickell was born in Oak Cliff, a neighborhood of Dallas, Texas, to Larry Jean (Sellers) Linden and Paul Edward Brickell. She was raised with her older sister, Laura Strain. She attended Booker T. Washington High School for the Performing and Visual Arts in Dallas, and later studied at Southern Methodist University until she joined a band and decided to focus on songwriting.

== Music career ==
=== Edie Brickell & New Bohemians ===
In 1985, Brickell was invited to sing one night with friends from her high school in a local folk rock group, New Bohemians. She joined the band as lead singer. After the band was signed to a recording contract, the label changed the group's name to Edie Brickell & New Bohemians. Their 1988 debut album, Shooting Rubberbands at the Stars, became a critical and commercial success, including the Top Ten single "What I Am". The band's follow-up album, Ghost of a Dog (1990), was a deliberate effort to highlight the band's eclectic personality and move away from the pop sound of their first record.

In these first two albums and subsequent tours Brickell became known as a singer who could create lyrics on the spot. Of this talent she said, "It's nothing special...strange thoughts are always running through my head."

The band sporadically played gigs after the album Ghost of a Dog in 1990, and in 2006 released Stranger Things. In 2018 they announced their latest album, Rocket, along with dates for a US tour. The band released their fifth studio album Hunter and the Dog Star in 2021 available on CD and vinyl.

=== Solo career ===
As a solo artist, Brickell released Picture Perfect Morning (1994), Volcano (2003) and Edie Brickell (2011). The video for Picture Perfect Morning's "Good Times" was included as part of the multimedia samples featured on Microsoft's Windows 95 Companion CD-ROM. In 1992, she worked with producer Bob Wiseman in New York and Toronto on a collection of songs, utilizing a wind ensemble, unusual keyboards, and Ron Sexsmith. The songs were rejected by the record company and remain unreleased.

=== The Gaddabouts ===
In 2010, Brickell became a founding member of new band The Gaddabouts, consisting of Steve Gadd on drums, Edie Brickell as lead vocalist and guitar, Andy Fairweather Low on electric and acoustic guitars and background vocals, Pino Palladino on bass and guitar, and featuring Dan Block, Ronnie Cuber, Joey DeFrancesco, Gil Goldstein, and Marcus Rojas. In 2011, Brickell wrote the title track, "The Meaning of Life", for Tamar Halpern's film, Jeremy Fink and the Meaning of Life.

=== Edie Brickell and Steve Martin ===
Love Has Come for You was released on April 23, 2013. The album is a collaboration with Steve Martin. Both appeared on talk shows, such as The View and Late Show with David Letterman, to promote the album in April 2013.

Starting in May 2013, she toured with Martin and the Steep Canyon Rangers throughout North America.

In 2016, the musical Bright Star – to which she contributed music, lyrics, and story – opened on Broadway at the Cort Theatre.

In 2017, Brickell and Martin appeared in the documentary film The American Epic Sessions directed by Bernard MacMahon. They recorded "The Coo Coo Bird", a traditional English folk song, live on the first electrical sound recording system from the 1920s. The track appeared on the accompanying soundtrack, Music from The American Epic Sessions.

=== Heavy MakeUp ===
In 2023, Brickell became the founding vocalist of new band Heavy MakeUp, alongside brass player CJ Camerieri and trumpeter Trever Hagen. The band combines vocals, synth, brass, and drum machines in their music. Their self-titled debut album was released in 2023, and their second album, Here It Comes, was released in 2024.

=== World Famous Pets ===
In 2026, Brickell revealed her band, World Famous Pets, with Matt Chamberlain, Kaveh Rastegar, and Mason Stoops.

== Personal life ==
Brickell married singer-songwriter Paul Simon on May 30, 1992. It was her first marriage and Simon's third. Brickell was performing "What I Am" on NBC's Saturday Night Live on November 5, 1988, when she noticed Simon standing in front of the cameraman. "Even though I'd performed the song hundreds of times in clubs, he made me forget how the song went when I looked at him. We can show the kids the tape and say, 'Look, that's when we first laid eyes on each other.'" Brickell and Simon have three children: Adrian, Lulu, and Gabriel.

== Discography ==
=== Albums ===
==== Edie Brickell & New Bohemians ====
- It's Like This... (cassette-only, 1986)
- Shooting Rubberbands at the Stars (1988) US No. 4, 2× platinum
- Ghost of a Dog (1990)
- The Live Montauk Sessions (2000)
- The Ultimate Collection (2002)
- Stranger Things (2006)
- Rocket (2018)
- Hunter and the Dog Star (2021)

==== Solo ====
- Picture Perfect Morning (1994)
- Volcano (2003)
- Edie Brickell (2011)

==== Other ====
- The Heavy Circles (2008) - The Heavy Circles
- The Gaddabouts (2011) – The Gaddabouts
- Look Out Now! (2012) – The Gaddabouts
- Love Has Come for You (2013) – with Steve Martin
- LIVE: Steve Martin and Steep Canyon Rangers featuring Edie Brickell (2014)
- So Familiar (2015) – with Steve Martin
- Heavy MakeUp (2023) - Heavy MakeUp
- Here It Comes (2024) - Heavy MakeUp

=== Singles ===
- "What I Am" (Edie Brickell & New Bohemians) (1988) No. 7 on Billboard Hot 100 |UK No. 31
- "Circle" (Edie Brickell & New Bohemians) No. 48 on Billboard Hot 100 |UK No. 74
- "Love Like We Do" (Edie Brickell & New Bohemians) UK No. 139
- "Little Miss S." (Edie Brickell & New Bohemians) (1989)
- "A Hard Rain's A-Gonna Fall" (Edie Brickell & New Bohemians) (1990) UK No. 83 The song appears on the motion picture soundtrack to Born on the Fourth of July (1989).
- "Mama Help Me" (Edie Brickell & New Bohemians)
- "Good Times" (Edie Brickell) No. 60 on Billboard Hot 100
- "Pretty Little One" (Steve Martin and Steep Canyon Rangers featuring Edie Brickell)
- "Like to Get to Know You" (duet with Paul Simon) (2014)

=== Other contributions ===
- MSG Grateful Dead 1993 (September 20, 1993) – "Space" > "The Other One" > "Going Down the Road Feeling Bad"
- Trios (1994) – Rob Wasserman
- Windows 95 (1995) – "Good Times" Video
- First Wish (1995) – Chris Botti
- WFUV: City Folk Live VII (2004) – "Take a Walk"
- The Way, Way Back OST (2013) - "For the Time Being" & "Go Where the Love Is" – The Gaddabouts
- Music from The American Epic Sessions: Original Motion Picture Soundtrack (2017) – "The Coo Coo Bird"
