= Here's Where the Story Ends =

1990 single by the Sundays

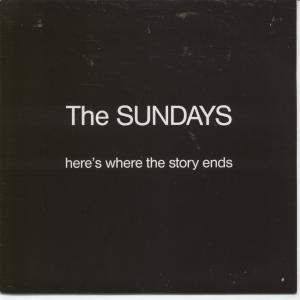

Single by the Sundays

from the album Reading, Writing and Arithmetic
- Released: January 1990
- Genre: Jangle pop; alternative rock; dream pop
- Length: 3:54
- Label: DGC; Rough Trade
- Songwriters: David Gavurin; Harriet Wheeler
- Producers: The Sundays; Ray Shulman

The Sundays singles chronology
"Can't Be Sure" (1989)	"Here's Where the Story Ends" (1990)	"Love" (1991)

Music video
- "Here's Where the Story Ends" on YouTube

"Here's Where the Story Ends" is a song by English alternative rock band the Sundays. It was the second single released from the band's debut album, Reading, Writing and Arithmetic (1990). The song was the Sundays' breakthrough hit, topping the US Billboard Modern Rock Tracks chart. "Here's Where the Story Ends" has been covered by Tin Tin Out, who had a top-10 hit in the United Kingdom with their version, and the song's writers won an Ivor Novello Award for Best Contemporary Song following the success of the cover version.

== Reception ==
"Here's Where the Story Ends" was released as the second single from the Sundays' debut album, Reading, Writing and Arithmetic (1990). The song reached number one on the US Modern Rock Tracks chart and became the band's breakthrough hit. It also placed No. 36 on John Peel's Festive Fifty for 1990.

PopMatters described the song as follows: "Set to an upbeat, jangly guitar-pop backdrop, Harriet Wheeler enchants listeners with her brisk, crystalline vocals and a crisp melodic hook. The song’s feel is evocative of a breezy, moderately cool yet still lovely autumn afternoon".

According to Pitchfork, "Here's Where the Story Ends" had "more than one leg stuck in the 1980s, its gentle jangle pop and bookish miserabilism inevitably recalling fellow Rough Trade signees the Smiths. At the same time, [it] has such a titanically strong pop melody—conveying a bittersweet tale of nostalgic longing—that it feels untethered to anything as prosaic as the calendar year".

== Charts ==
=== Weekly charts ===
Chart (1990)	Peak position
US Modern Rock Tracks (Billboard)	1

=== Year-end charts ===
Chart (1990)	Position
US Modern Rock Tracks (Billboard)	3

== Tin Tin Out version ==
"Here's Where the Story Ends"

Single by Tin Tin Out featuring Shelley Nelson

from the album Always
- Released: 16 March 1998
- Genre: Dance-pop; house
- Length: 4:03
- Label: VC; Virgin
- Songwriters: David Gavurin; Harriet Wheeler
- Producer: Tin Tin Out

Tin Tin Out singles chronology
"Strings for Yasmin" (1997)	"Here's Where the Story Ends" (1998)	"Sometimes" (1998)

Music video
- "Here's Where the Story Ends" on YouTube

English electronic music duo Tin Tin Out recorded "Here's Where the Story Ends" for their second album, Always, in 1998. The Tin Tin Out version of the song features vocals by English singer-songwriter Shelley Nelson. The track, released by labels VC Recordings and Virgin Underground, reached number one on the UK airplay charts, number seven on the UK Singles Chart, number 10 in Scotland, number 21 in Iceland and number 30 on the Eurochart Hot 100. Outside Europe, it peaked at number 15 on the US Billboard Dance Club Play chart and number 45 in New Zealand. The song's writers, Harriet Wheeler and David Gavurin, won the 1999 Ivor Novello Award for "Best Contemporary Song" for "Here's Where the Story Ends" following the success of the cover version.

=== Critical reception ===
Upon the release, pan-European magazine Music & Media wrote, "This dance duo − DJ Darren Stokes and multi-instrumentalist Lindsay Edwards − started out as remixers for the likes of Urban Cookie Collective, Espiritu and Captain Hollywood. However, their own output could just as easily be described as pop with a strong dance element as the other way around. 'Here's Where the Story Ends' has taken the British Isles by storm, and first indications are that it could also do pretty well on the continent. A host of remixes render the song suitable for formats ranging from fairly mellow AC to dance."

Chris Finan of Record Mirror gave the song a full score of five out of five, saying, "Stokesy & Edwards follow 'Strings for Yasmin' with another full-power house track. Big beats and heavy bass dominate their own mix — huge kicks and loud samples, much like their recent non-speed-garage productions." Marcus Berkmann from The Spectator called it a "redundant new interpretation". He added, "So perhaps we should praise the enterprise, if nothing else, of Tin Tin Out (whoever they are) for taking one of the Sundays' best tunes, reproducing it almost exactly and then slapping a thumpy dance beat all over it. Result: instant top ten single, which is one more than the Sundays themselves have managed up to now." Sunday Mirror described the song as a "good (but sacrilegious) version" and named it one of the "highlights" from the Always album.

=== Track listings ===
UK CD single
No.	Title	Length
1.	"Here's Where the Story Ends" (radio version)	4:03
2.	"Here's Where the Story Ends" (Mansa's soundtrack version)	6:11
3.	"Here's Where the Story Ends" (original extended mix)	5:50
4.	"Here's Where the Story Ends" (Tin Tin Out club mix)	7:53
5.	"Here's Where the Story Ends" (Canny remix)	7:14
6.	"Here's Where the Story Ends" (KLM remix)	8:11

UK 12-inch single
No.	Title	Length
1.	"Here's Where the Story Ends" (Tin Tin Out club mix)	7:55
2.	"Here's Where the Story Ends" (KLM remix)	9:04
3.	"Here's Where the Story Ends" (Canny remix)	9:15
4.	"Here's Where the Story Ends" (Mansa's soundtrack version)	6:30

UK cassette single
No.	Title	Length
1.	"Here's Where the Story Ends" (radio version)	4:03
2.	"Here's Where the Story Ends" (Mansa's soundtrack version)	6:11
3.	"Here's Where the Story Ends" (Canny remix)	7:14

=== Charts ===
==== Weekly charts ====
Weekly chart performance
Chart (1998)	Peak position
Australia (ARIA)	187
Estonia (Eesti Top 20)	6
Europe (Eurochart Hot 100)	30
Iceland (Íslenski Listinn Topp 40)	21
New Zealand (Recorded Music NZ)	45
Scottish Singles Sales (Official Charts)	10
UK Airplay (Media Control UK)	1
UK Singles (Official Charts)	7
UK Dance (Official Charts)	5
US Dance Club Play (Billboard)	15

==== Year-end charts ====
Chart (1998)	Position
UK Singles (OCC)	114

=== Certifications ===
Region	Certification	Certified units/sales
United Kingdom (BPI)	Silver	200,000^{‡}
^{‡} Sales+streaming figures based on certification alone.

== See also ==
- List of Billboard number-one alternative singles of the 1990s
