= Edie Brickell & New Bohemians =

Alternative rock jam band

- Edie Brickell & New Bohemians, 1988

Background information
- Also known as: New Bohemians; The Slip
- Origin: Dallas, Texas, U.S.
- Genres: Alternative rock, folk rock, neo-psychedelia, southern rock, jam rock
- Years active: 1985–1991, 1997–2023
- Labels: Geffen, Thirty Tigers
- Members: Brandon Aly; Edie Brickell; Kenny Withrow; John Bush
- Past members: Brad Houser; Eric Presswood; Wes Burt-Martin; Matt Chamberlain; Carter Albrecht; Chris Wheatley; Chris Whitten; Wix Wickens
- Website: ebnewbos.com

Edie Brickell & New Bohemians is an American alternative rock jam band that originated in Dallas, Texas, in the mid-1980s. The band is widely known for their 1988 hit "What I Am" from the album Shooting Rubberbands at the Stars. Their music contains elements of rock, folk, blues, and jazz. Following the 1990 release of their second album Ghost of a Dog, lead singer Edie Brickell left the band and married singer-songwriter Paul Simon. In 2006, she and the band launched a new web site and released a new album, Stranger Things.

== History ==
=== Early years and beginnings ===
New Bohemians started as a trio in the early 1980s, gaining experience in the Deep Ellum neighborhood of downtown Dallas, Texas. The original line-up featured Brad Houser on vibraslap, Eric Presswood on guitar, and Brandon Aly on drums.

Drummer Aly, guitarist Kenny Withrow, and percussionist John Bush went to the same arts magnet high school in Dallas: Booker T. Washington High School for the Performing and Visual Arts. Singer Edie Brickell also went to this school; however, the other members of the band didn't know her until later, and according to Houser, Edie was there for art. Houser attended Hillcrest High School and lived in the same neighborhood as other band members. He played in various neighborhood bands like The Knobs which included Kenny Withrow, and was also in the Munch Puppies.

The additional core members joined in 1985. Edie became the singer after being encouraged to join the band onstage during a show. It was soon after this first show that a local agent who was booking bands at Rick's Casablanca was brought to hear the band. The band signed a six-month management contract which brought with it better paying gigs at Rick's. When the six months ended, they started regular gigging in the Deep Ellum neighborhood of the city. Presswood left and Kenny Withrow joined as guitarist, playing his first show in July 1985 at the Starck Club in Dallas. John Bush joined on percussion in September of that year: his first show with the band was September 12, 1985, at Poor David's Pub in Dallas, when the band was backing Bo Diddley.

New Bos, as the band was often referred to, were a local favorite, packing in the fans at now-famous Deep Ellum venues such as "Theater Gallery", "500 Cafe", and "Club Dada". They were also regular performers at the annual Fry Street Fair on the University of North Texas campus in Denton, Texas. During this period of the band history, Edie's name was not used.

=== Release of the albums and the successful first one ===
Their debut album, Shooting Rubberbands at the Stars, was released in 1988 and became a commercial success. It produced the US top 10 hit "What I Am". The following album, Ghost of a Dog, was released in 1990 and was less successful. New Bohemians disbanded soon after the album's release. In the mid-1990s, Brickell, Bush and Withrow gave birth to The Slip, a side project.

Years later, New Bohemians released both a compilation and a live album. In 2006, current members reunited to record and tour, with the release of the album Stranger Things on July 25 that year. On September 3, 2007, the group mourned the death of band member Carter Albrecht, who was shot in Dallas that day.

On October 12, 2018, the band released the album Rocket. On February 19, 2021, the band released the third album after the reunion, Hunter and the Dog Star.

=== Live shows and concerts ===
The band played live at the North Oak Cliff Music Festival in October 2014 with the current lineup as well as keyboardist and multi-instrumentalist Matt Hubbard. The band reunited again in April 2017 with three concerts at the Kessler Theater in Oak Cliff.

== Members ==
=== Current members ===
- Brandon Aly – drums
- Edie Brickell – vocals, guitar
- John Walter Bush – percussion
- Kenneth Neil Withrow – guitar

=== Previous members ===
- Carter Albrecht – keyboards, electric guitar, harmonica, vocals (died 2007)
- Wes Burt-Martin – guitar
- Matt Chamberlain – drums
- John Bradley Houser – bass guitar, woodwinds (died 2023)
- Eric Presswood – guitar
- Chris Wheatley – keyboards
- Chris Whitten – drums
- Paul "Wix" Wickens – keyboards

== Discography ==
=== Albums ===
==== Studio albums ====
Title	Album details	Peak chart positions									Certifications
Title	Album details	US	AUS	AUT	CAN	GER	IT	NL	NZ	UK	Certifications
Shooting Rubberbands at the Stars	Released: August 9, 1988; Label: Geffen; Formats: CD, LP, MC	4	31	12	3	29	5	33	10	25	UK: Gold; US: 2× Platinum
Ghost of a Dog	Released: October 30, 1990; Label: Geffen; Formats: CD, LP, MC	32	148	—	43	—	—	—	—	63	
Stranger Things	Released: July 25, 2006; Label: Fantasy; Formats: CD	—	—	—	—	—	—	—	—	—	
Rocket	Released: October 12, 2018; Label: Verve Forecast; Formats: CD, LP, digital download	—	—	—	—	—	—	—	—	—	
Hunter and the Dog Star	Released: February 19, 2021; Label: Shuffle/Thirty Tigers; Formats: CD, LP, digital download	—	—	—	—	—	—	—	—	—	
"—" denotes releases that did not chart or were not released in that territory.

==== Live albums ====
Title	Album details
The Live Montauk Sessions	Released: 2000; Label: Self-released; Formats: CD

==== Compilation albums ====
Title	Album details
Ultimate Collection	Released: 10 September 2002; Label: Hip-O/Geffen; Formats: CD

=== Singles ===
Title	Year	Peak chart positions										Album
Title	Year	US	US Alt	US Main	AUS	CAN	IRE	IT	NL	NZ	UK	Album
"What I Am"	1988	7	4	9	18	1	23	14	—	11	31	Shooting Rubberbands at the Stars
"Little Miss S." [airplay]	1989	—	14	38	—	—	—	—	—	—	—	Shooting Rubberbands at the Stars
"Circle"	1989	48	—	32	80	35	—	—	39	—	74	Shooting Rubberbands at the Stars
"Love Like We Do"	1989	—	—	—	—	—	—	—	—	—	—	Shooting Rubberbands at the Stars
"A Hard Rain's a-Gonna Fall"	1990	—	21	28	85	—	—	—	—	—	83	Born on the Fourth of July soundtrack
"Mama Help Me"	1990	—	17	26	165	89	—	—	—	—	—	Ghost of a Dog
"Black & Blue"	1991	—	—	—	—	—	—	—	—	—	—	Ghost of a Dog
"One Last Time"	2006	—	—	—	—	—	—	—	—	—	—	Stranger Things
"What Makes You Happy"	2018	—	—	—	—	—	—	—	—	—	—	Rocket
"Tell Me"	2018	—	—	—	—	—	—	—	—	—	—	Rocket
"Exaggerate"	2019	—	—	—	—	—	—	—	—	—	—	Rocket
"My Power"	2020	—	—	—	—	—	—	—	—	—	—	Hunter and the Dog Star
"—" denotes releases that did not chart or were not released in that territory.

== Awards and nominations ==
Year	Awards	Work	Category	Result
1988	Billboard Music Awards	"What I Am"	Top Modern Rock Track	Nominated
1989	International Rock Awards	Themselves	Newcomer of the Year	Nominated
1989	Pollstar Concert Industry Awards	Tour	Small Hall Tour of the Year	Nominated
1989	Pollstar Concert Industry Awards	Tour	Best Debut Tour	Nominated
1989	MTV Video Music Awards	"What I Am"	Best New Artist	Nominated
1990	ASCAP Pop Music Awards	"What I Am"	Most Performed Song	Won
1990	MTV Video Music Awards	"A Hard Rain's a-Gonna Fall"	Best Video from a Film	Nominated
1991	MTV Video Music Awards	"Mama Help Me"	Best Art Direction	Nominated
