= Belle de Jour =

Belle de Jour may refer to:

- Belle de Jour (novel), a 1928 novel by French writer Joseph Kessel
- Belle de Jour (film), 1967 film by Luis Buñuel, based upon the book
- Belle de Jour (writer), a pen name of Brooke Magnanti
- Belle de Jour (character), a character in the television series Secret Diary of a Call Girl, based on one of Magnanti's books
- "Belle de Jour", a song on the album Grace for Drowning by Steven Wilson.
