= Billie and the Real Belle Bare All =

- Billie and the Real Belle Bare All intertitle
- Directed by: John Pereira
- Presented by: Billie Piper
- Theme music composer: Amy Winehouse
- Opening theme: "You Know I'm No Good"
- Country of origin: United Kingdom

Production
- Production locations: The May Fair Hotel, London
- Running time: 23 minutes
- Production company: Tiger Aspect Productions

Original release
- Network: ITV2
- Release: 25 January 2010

Related
- Secret Diary of a Call Girl

Billie and the Real Belle Bare All is a one-off television programme that aired on ITV2 on 25 January 2010, ahead of the Series 3 premiere of Secret Diary of a Call Girl. The programme, which took place at The May Fair, consisted of Billie Piper, who stars as Hannah Baxter in Secret Diary of a Call Girl, interviewing Dr. Brooke Magnanti, a former call girl who, until November 2009 remained anonymous, known only by the pseudonym, "Belle de Jour."

Magnanti first rose to fame as a blogger who documented her life as a call girl. She later released a series of books, including The Intimate Adventures of a London Call Girl, and writes a column in various newspapers.

== Summary ==
The programme starts with Billie Piper entering a hackney carriage, as her character frequently does on Secret Diary of a Call Girl, and driving to the Mayfair Hotel. Whilst in the cab, Piper, through a voice-over, says "the first thing you should know is today, I'm going to meet a whore", a reference to the line in Episode 1 of Secret Diary of a Call Girl, "the first thing you should know about me is that I'm a whore". Piper walks into the Mayfair Hotel and walks across the lobby, heading towards the lift, another direct reference to Secret Diary of a Call Girl. As she enters the hotel the screen splits in two, showing the original scene from Secret Diary of a Call Girl.

The interview was then conducted in the Schiaparelli Suite of the hotel, where Piper and Magnanti discussed her experiences of being a call girl and the social issues surrounding prostitution. Towards the end of the interview Piper asked various quick questions, such as how much Magnanti would earn, to which she replied that she would charge £300 and keep £200 (£100 was given to the agency). She also revealed whilst doing the 'girlfriend experience' she would earn anything from £800 to £1,400.

Piper and Magnanti then took part in a photoshoot on the bed in the suite, and whilst doing so Piper narrated through voice-overs, summarising her thoughts on Magnanti and prostitution itself.

== Reception ==
The Guardian stated that Piper's interviewing style was "very much girls on the couch for a cosy chat" and that Piper did not negatively interview Magnanti on topics surrounding prostitution, stating that Piper gave Magnanti a "pretty easy ride". However Sam Wollaston of the same publication gave a more negative review, saying "[Piper's] never interviewed anyone before. To be honest, it shows. She interrupts mid-answer, sometimes when Dr Magnanti is in the middle of saying something quite interesting." Wollaston later satirically stated that "maybe her interviewing style is quite refreshing after the machismo of Humphrys and Paxman".

The episode, which aired from 10:00 pm, attracted 344,000 viewers, a 1.4% audience share. Although Billie and the Real Belle Bare All received moderate ratings considering ITV2 is a digital channel, its rating were significantly lower than any Secret Diary of a Call Girl episode.
