= List of Secret Diary of a Call Girl episodes =

Secret Diary of a Call Girl is a British television drama broadcast on ITV2 based on the blog and books by the pseudonymous "Belle de Jour," starring Billie Piper as "Belle", a high-class London call girl. The series was written by Lucy Prebble, who is also known as the author of The Sugar Syndrome and ENRON. The series has been compared to Sex and the City by many critics, mainly due to its humorous approach to sex. The third series began on 28 January 2010, on ITV2. The fourth and final series began on 1 February 2011, on ITV2.

== Series overview ==
Series	Episodes	Originally released		Ave. viewers (millions)
Series	Episodes	First released	Last released	Ave. viewers (millions)
1	8	27 September 2007	15 November 2007	1.24
2	8	11 September 2008	23 October 2008	0.98
Special		25 January 2010		0.34
3	8	28 January 2010	11 March 2010	0.83
4	8	1 February 2011	22 March 2011	0.65

== Episodes ==
=== Series 1 (2007) ===
No.	Episode	Directed by	Written by	Original release date	UK viewers (millions)
1	Episode 1.1	Yann Demange	Lucy Prebble	27 September 2007	2.00
Belle is a high-end call girl. She explains to the viewers how she goes about her business, what rules she puts on herself and strategies she uses to find the client's fantasy and desired act. In her private life, she is Hannah, a woman who hangs out with her ex-boyfriend and buddy Ben, and do fun stuff like pretend to be a young couple to check out some luxury townhomes. When one of Belle's clients abandons the act, she learns from her agent that he really wanted a plain girl next door so she dresses that part on their next visit. Another client initially just wanted her to be on top, but in his return visit she gets to ride him like a horse.
2	Episode 1.2	Yann Demange	Lucy Prebble	4 October 2007	1.48
Belle attends an exclusive adult party with a client who mainly wants her to act as eye candy to make the other folks jealous and so he can have her all to himself later that night. She bumps into her favorite novelist and wants to go home with him and his female companion. She to tries break off the deal with the client, citing "personal reasons", but then gets a call from her family and uses the personal reasons excuse for real to get out of both situations so she can visit her sister who has just had a baby.
3	Episode 1.3	Yann Demange	Lucy Prebble & Julie Gearey	11 October 2007	1.10
A regular client hires Belle for a girlfriend experience, starting with attending some theatre event, but leaving early to have sex with her at a hotel. When he falls asleep, Belle gets bored as she was hired for the entire night. She leaves the room to hang out in the lobby where another guy hires her and she has to finish that work before the first client wakes up.
4	Episode 1.4	Yann Demange	Lucy Prebble	18 October 2007	1.11
When her tax accountant shows interest in S&M, Belle gets a dominatrix to teach her. Meanwhile, Ben surprises her with the news that he got engaged over a month ago. This upsets Belle that she doesn't want to answer his phone calls and then she gets a little too harsh on the accountant. She and Ben talk it out briefly afterwards about what their friendship is. Afterwards, she texts Ben a link to her secret identity.
5	Episode 1.5	Sue Tully	Nicole Taylor	25 October 2007	1.08
Belle's agent wants her to do a threesome with her long-time client Ashok and a new colleague named Naomi. The session goes fine, and afterwards, it seems like the two women could become friends, until she learns that the next week Ashok is going with Naomi from now on. She gets Ben to come over to commiserate.
6	Episode 1.6	Sue Tully	Katie Douglas	1 November 2007	1.00
When Belle gets a bad online review, Stephanie sets her up with a difficult client which makes her situation worse. Ben has her take a day off and observe what life is like in the daytime world. She meets a guy (Matt Smith) and they have a fling, but when he overstays his welcome and questions what she does for work, Ben comes to bail her out. Stephanie tells Belle that she's back in demand thanks to a favorable review (secretly written by Ben).
7	Episode 1.7	Sue Tully	Julie Gearey	8 November 2007	1.19
Ben volunteers himself to be the male escort in Belle's upcoming foursome involving a married couple for their anniversary. She doesn't think it's a good idea, but after interviewing some other prospects, she agrees to have him do it. She teaches him some basics on how to behave and gives him some Viagra. During the evening, the couple gradually end up focused on each other, leaving Ben to wonder if he should get intimate with her.
8	Episode 1.8	Sue Tully	Lucy Prebble	15 November 2007	0.99
Belle's client Mitchell encourages her apply for a position as a courtesan. The job requires someone who is "up-market quality", but she is able to convince her interviewers to give her a chance. She quits her old service and moves into Mitchell's flat. She learns that courtesans have very few select clients. Mitchell gets frustrated with her during a trip to Scotland, she calls her new agent and learns that Mitchell is a "collector", with courtesans all over the world where he travels. She then invites Ben round to the apartment but they begin to argue since Ben is concerned that he's been spending more time with her than his fiancee. Frustrated with her job, she returns to her old flat and starts her own independent escort business.

=== Series 2 (2008) ===
No.	Episode	Directed by	Written by	Original release date	UK viewers (millions)
9	Episode 2.1	Fraser MacDonald	Lucy Prebble	11 September 2008	1.07
Belle meets her client Alex in the hotel bar and asks to go to his room, but when she checks his payment envelope he finds a passport and realises she met the wrong guy. She excuses herself and meets her client. However, she soon learns that her client is a politician and she gets a call from a journalist who wants to get her perspective on the soon-to-be-publicized sex scandal. She is late to her sister's baby christening and then messes up one of their activities. Ben, who has broken off his engagement with Vanessa, tries to console her. Meanwhile, a girl who goes by Bambi wants Belle's advice on how to get into the escort business.
10	Episode 2.2	Fraser MacDonald	Lucy Prebble	11 September 2008	1.04
Belle gets a consultation from a plastic surgeon regarding her breasts. Bambi continues to solicit advice from Belle, who refers her briefly to Stephanie. Bambi encourages Belle to go on a date with Alex, but while Belle goes to respond on the date, Bambi takes on Belle's potential client, but gets in trouble when the client gets aggressive, prompting Belle to interrupt her date to check on her.
11	Episode 2.3	Fraser MacDonald	Julie Gearey	18 September 2008	1.08
Belle talks about giving her clients girlfriend experiences, but then the wife of a client shows up and accuses her of having an affair with her husband. Belle begins to question whether she can have a relationship outside of work, checking in with Ben, and also being a girlfriend with Alex. Meanwhile, Bambi joins Stephanie's agency.
12	Episode 2.4	Fraser MacDonald	Chloe Moss	25 September 2008	0.88
Belle is unable to do a threesome with Bambi and a nightclub owner, because she gets thoughts about Alex. Ben tells her that if she wants to continue a relationship with Alex, she will have to tell him the truth about her work. Meanwhile, Alex becomes more curious as to her deviousness and not answering his straightforward concerns like not being able to visit her flat. She sets up a meeting among herself, Alex and Ben, but that leaves more questions.
13	Episode 2.5	Peter Lydon	Nicole Taylor	2 October 2008	0.90
Hannah decides she will tell Alex that she is a prostitute. She invites him over but he has a weekend function, so she says to come the next day. She services a young man in a wheelchair, but that same day, Alex decides to visit and catches her in the act. Alex is disgusted and runs off to confront Ben about it. Hannah sees the two talking and returns to her flat. Alex later arrives and wordlessly dumps her belongings on the floor and leaves.
14	Episode 2.6	Peter Lydon	Rebecca Lenkiewicz	9 October 2008	0.97
Belle tries to get her mind off Alex by going with Bambi to a sex party at a manor out in the country. They dress up as fantasy characters Rapunzel and Little Red Riding Hood respectively. But when one of the clients ties Belle up and is being forceful, she screams. Bambi bails her out and they escape, requesting Ben to pick them up. Belle has Ben stay the night, and they end up sleeping together and have sex.
15	Episode 2.7	Peter Lydon	Tim Price	16 October 2008	0.96
After the awkward one-night stand with Ben, Hannah tries to make up to Alex by trying to "go straight", boxing away all her call girl outfits and stuff, and getting a job in an office. She persuades Alex to spend the night with her after his car battery runs out. Meanwhile, Ben gets hit on by a woman at his workplace and sleeps with her. The next day, Hannah is late to work and then botches her first tasks, and eventually quits. Alex is in Hannah's apartment when Ben arrives, having gotten really drunk. Ben tells Hannah he broke up with Vanessa, so Hannah tries to comfort him.
16	Episode 2.8	Peter Lydon	Julie Gearey	23 October 2008	0.90
Stephanie offers Belle one last job, but she refuses. She sees Alex off and pretends to go to her day job but returns to her flat. She meets with Ben to see what other jobs she could do, when Ben suggests she writes about something she knows. Alex discovers Hannah isn't working at her workplace. Hannah sits at her laptop and starts writing about being Belle, but she walks out from keeping a meeting Ben has arranged with a potential publisher of her memoirs as a call girl. She returns to Stephanie and accepts a job paying £5000, but the client turns out to be Alex confirming that she has not given up her call girl lifestyle, and they part ways. She finishes writing her memoirs and gets them published, and lands a television interview where she disguises herself in dark hair and shades.

=== Billie and the Real Belle Bare All (2010) ===
Billie and the Real Belle Bare All is a one-off television program that aired on ITV2 on 25 January 2010, ahead of the Series 3 premiere of Secret Diary of a Call Girl. The program, which took place at The May Fair, consisted of Billie Piper, who stars as Hannah Baxter in Secret Diary of a Call Girl, interviewing Dr. Brooke Magnanti, a former call girl who, until November 2009 remained anonymous known only by the pseudonym "Belle de Jour".

=== Series 3 (2010) ===
No.	Episode	Directed by	Written by	Original release date	UK viewers (millions)
17	Episode 3.1	Owen Harris	Chloe Moss	28 January 2010	0.92
18	Episode 3.2	Owen Harris	Tim Price	28 January 2010	0.88
19	Episode 3.3	Owen Harris	Richard Hurst	4 February 2010	0.73
20	Episode 3.4	Owen Harris	Rebecca Lenkiewicz	11 February 2010	0.81
21	Episode 3.5	China Moo-Young	Rebecca Lenkiewicz	18 February 2010	0.94
22	Episode 3.6	China Moo-Young	Richard Hurst	25 February 2010	0.89
23	Episode 3.7	China Moo-Young	Chloe Moss & Tim Price	4 March 2010	0.81
24	Episode 3.8	China Moo-Young	Julie Gearey	11 March 2010	0.73

=== Series 4 (2011) ===
No.	Episode	Directed by	Written by	Original release date	UK viewers (millions)
25	Episode 4.1	Alex García López & Wayne Che Yip	Julie Gearey	1 February 2011	0.83
Belle is back from her trip, moves into a new townhouse, and entertains a young barrister with a "downstairs" problem. She learns that Stephanie is remanded in custody for money laundering. Whilst reluctant to take over the business she agrees to host Stephanie's daughter Poppy, who is innocent of her mother's work. Also, she debates whether or not to give a relationship with Ben another try.
26	Episode 4.2	Alex García López & Wayne Che Yip	Richard Hurst	8 February 2011	0.67
Belle juggles being Stephanie's replacement and handling an awkward virgin client.
27	Episode 4.3	Alex García López & Wayne Che Yip	Simeon Goulden	15 February 2011	0.61
Belle meets Detective Harry Keegan who has a passion for public sex, while Poppy finds out some uncomfortable home truths about Stephanie and Belle. Belle's sister Jackie makes a surprise re-appearance which causes some awkward moments between Hannah and Ben.
28	Episode 4.4	Alex García López & Wayne Che Yip	Laura Neal	22 February 2011	0.57
Accompanying Poppy on a visit to prison, Belle watches as she confronts Stephanie about her secrets, while Belle is offered a movie deal for her best-selling book. Mother and daughter merely end up rowing. Belle takes parental control when she catches Poppy in bed with a boy she picked up in a bar. This leads to an argument between Ben and Belle.
29	Episode 4.5	Sam Donovan	Simeon Goulden	1 March 2011	0.66
Belle travels to New York City to oversee production of the movie based on her book, but the female actor and male director of her projected film adaptation get a little too carried away enacting scenes. She misses Ben and the feeling is mutual as he fights off the attentions of Poppy, whom Charlotte tries to recruit as a call-girl.
30	Episode 4.6	Sam Donovan	James Graham	8 March 2011	0.67
Belle returns to London and finds Ben and Poppy sleeping in the same bed, giving Belle the wrong idea. Furthermore, she find Charlotte running the business. She immerses herself in work, pleasuring a Japanese client who likes wrestling as well as winning back star client David from Charlotte. She also wins back Ben after Poppy admits he was innocent
31	Episode 4.7	Sam Donovan	Dan Sefton	15 March 2011	0.58
Belle has a vampire as client, who dies during the session. Hannah and Ben still fight and are tempted by new partners.
32	Episode 4.8	Sam Donovan	Nancy Harris	22 March 2011	0.60
Ben asks Belle to give up her job. With the added complication of the attractive and predatory Harry, Belle is left confused, but ultimately breaks up with Ben. Belle, walking away from Ben, passes Harry but looks away, leaving the impression she has decided to be alone.
