= Blog fiction =

Genre of fiction in the style of a blog

- Features: Fictional stories published as online weblogs.

Related genres
- Netprov, Hypertext fiction, Instapoetry, Creepypasta, Fan fiction

Blog fiction is an online literary genre that tells a fictional story in the style of a blog. In the early years of weblogs, blog fictions were described as an exciting new genres creating new opportunities for emerging authors, but were also described as "notorious" in part because they often uneasily tread the line between fiction and hoax. Sometimes blog fictions are republished as print books, and in other cases conventional novels are written in the style of a blog without having been published as an online blog. Blog fiction is a genre of Electronic literature.

== History ==
One of the first online stories to include blog-like elements is the online drama Online Caroline (2000). By 2004 blogging had become very popular, and blog fictions were the subject of several news articles that list a range of examples of the genre. Angela Thomas wrote a book chapter on blog fictions in 2006. A chapter of the book Blogging discusses fictional blogs in a chapter on blogs as narratives. In 2017, Emma Segar argued that "social and transmedia storytelling owe much to the narrative conventions established by the practice of blogging, but blog fiction itself has been a much overlooked form of digital literature".

Segar argues that a main feature of blog fiction is relationity between readers and fiction.

Blog fictions have been a particularly popular genre of electronic literature in Africa. The literary orality of blogs has also been analysed as a feature of African American blogs.

== Fiction, truth or hoax ==
Blog fictions are often presented as though they are true, much as early novels were often presented as a "real" diary or letters that had been found by the author. The uncertainty can be part of their attraction to readers. For example, the first blog described in a 2004 article in The Guardian about fiction blogs is Belle de Jour, a blog that turned out not to be fiction but a real diary by Brooke Magnanti. The blog was adapted into a print book, The Intimate Adventures of a London Call Girl, and the television series Secret Diary of a Call Girl. Other blogs, like Kaycee Nicole's blog, were assumed to be real, but then revealed to be a hoax. Yet others, like the video blog Lonelygirl15 were thought to be real but then revealed to be art projects.

Other early examples of blogs that were discussed as possible fiction include She's a Flight Risk. Some novels were written online as blog fictions and later published as print novels. An example is An Opening Act of Unspeakable Evil. (Blog: Roommate from Hell, 2003-2004).

There are also many conventional novels that are wholly or partially written in the style of a blog.

== Fan fiction and transmedia ==
Fan fiction is often written in the form of a fictional blog belonging to one of the characters in a show. Similarly, TV shows and transmedia stories often produce fictional blogs for characters either to extend the story or as a marketing strategy. In recent years, these blogs are more likely to be on existing social media platforms like Facebook or Instagram than on independent websites. For example, the popular show Skam had Instagram and YouTube accounts for several of the characters.

== Awards ==
Self-publishing provider Lulu sponsors the Lulu Blooker Prize, which began in 2006. The Blooker prize is an award given to the best "blook" of the year: a work of fiction begun as blog fiction and then transformed into a printed publication.
