= Belle de Jour (film) =

1967 film by Luis Buñuel

- Theatrical release poster
- Directed by: Luis Buñuel
- Screenplay by: Luis Buñuel; Jean-Claude Carrière
- Based on: Belle de Jour (1928 novel) by Joseph Kessel
- Produced by: Henri Baum; Robert Hakim; Raymond Hakim
- Starring: Catherine Deneuve; Jean Sorel; Michel Piccoli
- Cinematography: Sacha Vierny
- Edited by: Louisette Hautecoeur
- Production companies: Paris Film Production; Five Film
- Distributed by: Valoria (France); Euro International Films (Italy)
- Release dates: 24 May 1967 (France); 14 September 1967 (Italy)
- Running time: 101 minutes
- Countries: France; Italy
- Language: French
- Box office: 2,162,160 admissions (France)

Belle de Jour (pronounced [bɛl də ʒuʁ]) is a 1967 surrealist erotic psychological drama film directed by Luis Buñuel, from a screenplay he co-wrote with Jean-Claude Carrière. Based on the 1928 novel by Joseph Kessel, the film stars Catherine Deneuve in the leading role as Séverine, a bored young housewife who spends her midweek afternoons as a high-class prostitute while her husband is at work. It co-stars Jean Sorel, and Michel Piccoli, and features Geneviève Page, Francisco Rabal, Pierre Clémenti, Francis Blanche and Georges Marchal in supporting roles.

The title of the film is a play on words on the French term belle de nuit ("beauty of the night", i.e., a prostitute), as Séverine works during the day under the pseudonym "Belle de Jour". Her nickname can also be interpreted as a reference to the French name of the morning glory (Convolvulaceae), meaning "beauty of [the] day", a flower that blooms only during the day.

Belle de Jour is one of Buñuel's most successful and famous films. It was Deneuve's second acclaimed success after The Umbrellas of Cherbourg. It won the Golden Lion and the Pasinetti Award for Best Film at the Venice Film Festival in 1967. Deneuve was nominated for BAFTA Award for Best Actress in a Leading Role.

== Plot ==
Séverine Serizy, a young and beautiful housewife, is unable to share physical intimacy with her wealthy husband, Dr. Pierre Serizy, despite their love for each other. Her sexual life is restricted to elaborate surrealist fantasies involving her submitting to extreme forms of domination, sadomasochism, and bondage. Although frustrated by Pierre's wife's frigidity toward him, he respects her wishes.

While visiting the ski resort of Valberg, Pierre and Séverine meet two friends, Henri Husson and Renée. Séverine does not like Husson's manner and the way he looks at her. Back in Paris, Séverine meets up with Renée and learns that a common friend, Henriette, now works at a brothel. At her home, Séverine receives roses from Husson and is unsettled by the gesture. At the tennis courts, she bumps into Husson again, where they discuss Henriette and houses of pleasure. Husson mentions a high-class brothel at 11 Cité Jean de Saumur in Paris. He also confesses his desire for her, but Séverine rejects his advances.

Haunted by childhood memories, including one involving a man who appears to touch her inappropriately, Séverine goes to the high-class brothel, which is run by Madame Anaïs, who names her "Belle de Jour." That afternoon, Séverine services her first client. Reluctant at first, she responds to the "firm hand" of Madame Anaïs and has sex with the stranger. After staying away for a week, Séverine returns to the brothel and begins working from two to five o'clock each day, with one client being a submissive gynaecologist who rejects her for not understanding his fantasy, and another client being an Asian man who she takes a shine to. Every day at 5:00 pm, Séverine returns to her unsuspecting husband.

One afternoon, Séverine gets talking to an aristocratic Duke at an outdoor cafe. The Duke offers her a lot of money to visit him at his home one hour outside Paris, and gives her his business card. Some days later, Séverine is taken by horse and carriage to the Duke's enormous chateau. The Duke's footman orders Séverine to pretend to be dead in a coffin. The Duke comes into the room where Séverine is pretending to be dead, and he begins speaking to her as if Séverine is his dead daughter. The Duke apologises to his daughter for her death, and then lies down on the floor where he begins masturbating.

One day, Husson comes to visit Séverine at home, but she refuses to see him. Still, she fantasizes about submitting to Husson, who smashes a wine bottle and uses it on her underneath a dining table in a busy restaurant, while Pierre and Renée stay seated at the table, with Renée explaining to Pierre what Henri is doing to Séverine. As Séverine expresses her sexuality at the brothel, her physical relationship with her husband is improving and she begins having sex with him.

Séverine becomes involved with one of her clients, Marcel, a young criminal who offers her the kind of thrills and excitement of her submissive fantasies. One day, Husson visits the brothel and discovers Séverine, who asks him not to tell her husband about her secret life. He agrees and rejects her services, stating that he is no longer attracted to her. Séverine decides to leave the brothel with Madame Anaïs' blessing, as she believes it is due to Marcel becoming increasingly jealous and demanding. After one of his associates follows Séverine to her home, Marcel visits her at her home and threatens to reveal her secret to her husband. Séverine pleads with him to leave before Pierre comes home, to which Marcel agrees, referring to her husband as "the obstacle".

Marcel waits downstairs for Pierre to return home and shoots him three times. Marcel then flees, but is shot dead by police. Séverine's husband survives, but is left in a coma. The police are unable to find a motive for the attempted murder. Some time later, Séverine is at home taking care of Pierre, who is now paralysed from the neck down, blind, mute and in a wheelchair. Husson visits Pierre to tell him the truth about his wife's secret life; she does not try to stop him. After Husson leaves, Séverine returns to see Pierre crying, his paralysed hand half-clenched in a fist. In an ambiguous ending which is hinted to be another of her fantasies, Pierre then gets out of the wheelchair, pours himself a drink and discusses holiday plans with Séverine.

== Cast ==
- Catherine Deneuve as Séverine "Belle de Jour" Serizy
  - Dominique Dandrieux as child Séverine
  - Brigitte Parmentier as infant Séverine
- Jean Sorel as Dr. Pierre Serizy
- Michel Piccoli as Henri Husson
- Geneviève Page as Mme Anaïs
- Pierre Clémenti as Marcel
- Francisco Rabal as Hippolyte
- Françoise Fabian as Charlotte
- Macha Méril as Renée
- Maria Latour as Mathilde
- Marguerite Muni as Pallas
- Francis Blanche as M. Adolphe
- François Maistre as the Professor
- Georges Marchal as the Duke
- Iska Khan as Asian client
- Bernard Musson as the Footman
- François Maistre as the Teacher

== Production ==
=== Development and writing ===
In 1966, Buñuel was contacted by the Hakim brothers, Robert and Raymond, Egyptian-French producers who specialized in sexy films directed by star filmmakers, who offered him the opportunity to direct a film version of Joseph Kessel's novel Belle de Jour, a book about an affluent young woman who leads a double life as a prostitute, and that had caused a scandal upon its first publication in 1928. Buñuel did not like Kessel's novel, considering it "a bit of a soap opera", but he took on the challenge because: "I found it interesting to try to turn something I didn't like into something I did." So he and Carrière set out enthusiastically to interview women in the brothels of Madrid to learn about their sexual fantasies.

=== Casting ===
Buñuel also was not happy about the choice of the 22-year-old Catherine Deneuve for the title role, feeling that she had been foisted upon him by the Hakim brothers and Deneuve's lover at the time, director François Truffaut. As a result, both actress and director found working together difficult, with Deneuve claiming, "I felt they showed more of me than they'd said they were going to. There were moments when I felt totally used. I was very unhappy," and Buñuel deriding her prudery on the set.

Much of Deneuve's wardrobe was designed by Yves St. Laurent and Roger Vivier.

=== Filming ===
Principal photography lasted from 10 October 1966 to 12 December 1966. Shooting locations included:

- Valberg, a ski resort in the French alps in the Alpes-Maritimes department, where Deneuve was accompanied by her husband, the British fashion photographer David Bailey.
- 1 Plâce Albin-Cachot, Paris 13, France
- 79 Champs-Élysées, Paris 8, France
- Chalet de la Grande Cascade, Bois de Boulogne, Paris 16, France
- Champs Elysées, Paris 8, France
- Rue de Messine, Paris 8, France (Serizy's home)

== Release ==
=== Home media ===
American director Martin Scorsese promoted a 1995 limited re-release in America and a 2002 release on DVD.

== Reception ==
=== Critical response ===
On the review aggregator website Rotten Tomatoes, Belle de Jour holds an approval rating of 95% based on 60 reviews, with an average rating of 8.6/10. The website's critics consensus reads, "The radiantly filmed Belle de Jour entrances even as it resists easy interpretations." Roger Ebert of RogerEbert.com gave the film 4 stars out of 4 and included it into his Great Movies list.

In 2010, Belle de Jour was ranked No. 56 in Empire magazine's list of the 100 Best Films of World Cinema.

=== Awards and nominations ===
Institution	Year	Category	Nominee	Result
BAFTA Award	1969	Best Actress in a Leading Role	Catherine Deneuve	Nominated
Bodil Award	1968	Best European Film	Luis Buñuel	Won
French Syndicate of Cinema Critics	1968	Best Film	Luis Buñuel	Won
Venice Film Festival	1967	Golden Lion	Luis Buñuel	Won
Venice Film Festival	1967	Pasinetti Award	Luis Buñuel	Won

== Sequel ==
The 2006 film Belle Toujours, by Portuguese director Manoel de Oliveira, is a sequel to Belle de Jour. Set 30 years after the first film, it follows an encounter between the characters of Séverine and Henri. Michel Piccoli reprised his role as Henri, while Bulle Ogier replaced Catherine Deneuve as Séverine.

== Legacy ==
Brooke Magnanti, a former London escort who penned the 2005 book The Intimate Adventures of a London Call Girl, used "Belle de Jour" as her alias and pen name. The books were later adapted into the 2007 TV series Secret Diary of a Call Girl starring Billie Piper as Magnanti/de Jour.

== See also ==
- Sadism and masochism in fiction
- Surrealism
