= Stephanie Charlton =

- First appearance: Episode 1.1
- Last appearance: Episode 4.8
- Created by: Lucy Prebble
- Portrayed by: Cherie Lunghi

In-universe information
- Gender: Female
- Occupation: Madam; Former sex worker
- Children: Poppy (daughter)

Stephanie Charlton is a fictional character in the ITV series Secret Diary of a Call Girl. She is portrayed by the actress Cherie Lunghi.

== Character history ==
A city without whores is like a house without a bathroom...

Stephanie is Belle's madam; she herself was once a call girl. Rich and glamorous, with a cutting sense of humour, and cynical attitude, she reluctantly looks out for the girls that belong to her agency. "Do you know what love is Belle? A marketing ploy, remember that".

Stephanie is portrayed as an independent woman with eyes only for money. She never reveals anything remotely personal to the call girls, however, it is assumed that she is not married, due to her various cynical remarks, such as "you do this job long enough – you want to kick the shit out of a man". She is intensely private to the extent that she insinuates that Stephanie is not her real name; however in Series 4, with the arrival of her daughter Poppy, who calls her Stephanie, it can be assumed that Stephanie is in fact her real name.

Stephanie is Hannah's agent throughout Series 1 until Hannah leaves to become a courtesan, and then an independent escort; as a result their relationship sours and becomes increasingly bitter, however Stephanie occasionally gives Hannah jobs during Series 2. During Series 3, when Hannah becomes an anonymous published author, Stephanie discusses the book with Bambi and describes the book's madam as a "pantomime villain", without realising she is unwittingly describing herself. However, Stephanie's knowledge of Hannah being the author is left rather ambiguously, as in the next episode she confronts Hannah about her book, dubbing it "cheap" without any hints received from Bambi that Hannah is the author. Therefore, Stephanie could merely have been discussing the book to study Bambi's reaction, as Stephanie would be aware that Bambi has been informed of Hannah's authorship. During a conversation with Belle about the possibility of love and continuing prostitution, she reveals that she was once involved with a woman, who ended up taking advantage of her.

- Belle: "Do you think it could ever work? Seeing someone and doing this job?"
- Stephanie: "No. I thought it could once. Then she ran off with all my money. And my car."
- Belle: (Realising lesbian reference)"Oh! Right."
- Stephanie: "Money's the only thing worth having, Belle."

Despite being rich, and controlling a lucrative business, which involves her taking 40% of the profits made by each call girl, Stephanie occasionally may still work as a sex worker; after Hannah and Stephanie, coincidentally meet, whilst Stephanie is chained to a wall at a fetish party Stephanie reveals that she is there on both business and pleasure.

In Series 4, Stephanie is imprisoned after being stopped by the police, who discover various fake passports, thousands of pounds in cash (and a sex toy) in the boot of her car. Her surname is finally revealed in the finale, when her name is announced in the courtroom where she is being tried. She subsequently is found innocent.
