= Villa Clara =

Villa Clara may refer to:

- Villa Clara Province, Cuba
  - Santa Clara, Cuba, formerly known as Villa Clara
- Villa Clara, Entre Ríos, Argentina
- FC Villa Clara, Cuban football club
- Villa Clara (volleyball), Cuban volleyball club
- Naranjas de Villa Clara, Cuban baseball team
- Villa Clara Provincial Museum, Cuban museum
