= Hu Ting-ting =

Taiwanese actress

- Born: Hu Ting-ting; 11 September 1979 (age 46); Oxford, England, UK
- Education: Duke University (BA); University of Oxford (MPhil)
- Occupation: actress
- Years active: 2004-present

Chinese name
- Traditional Chinese: 胡婷婷
- Simplified Chinese: 胡婷婷
Transcriptions
Standard Mandarin
- Hanyu Pinyin: Hú Tíngtíng
- Musical career
- Also known as: Judy Hu
- Origin: Republic of China (Taiwan)

Hu Ting-ting or Judy Hu (Chinese: 胡婷婷; pinyin: Hú Tíngtíng; born 11 September 1979) is an English-born Taiwanese actress.

== Biography ==
She was born in Oxford and moved to Taiwan at the age of 6, and later with her parents moved to the United States for high school and college. She went to Duke University gaining a B.A. degree in public policy, and studied for her master's degree at the University of Oxford.

She is the daughter of politician Jason Hu and actress Shirley Shaw. She later married her long-term friend, Adam, on June 21, 2016.

== Filmography ==
Film
| Year | Film | Role | Notes |
|---|---|---|---|
| 2004 | Bridget Jones: The Edge of Reason | Escort girl/boy | Minor Role |
| 2006 | Breaking and Entering | Wei Ping | Minor Role |
| 2008 | Waiting in Beijing | Nancy | Main Role |
| 2008 | Ballistic | Gui Gui | Supporting Role |
| 2009 | Ghosted | Mei Li | Main Role |
Television series
| Year | Title | Role | Notes |
| 2005 | Un ciclone in famiglia | Mei Li | Supporting Role; Miniseries |
Television guest appearances
| Year | Title | Role | Episode(s) |
| 2005 | Ultimate Force | Mary | "Deadlier Than the Male" (episode 1, season 3) |
| 2005 | Afterlife | Chinese Woman | "Sleeping with the Dead" (episode 5, season 1) |
| 2006 | Silent Witness | Verity | "Terminus: Part 1" (episode 3, season 10) |
| 2008 | Hotel Babylon | Carol | "Episode 11" (episode 3, season 2) |
| 2008 | Secret Diary of a Call Girl | Anna | "1.8" (episode 8, season 1) |
