= Episode 1.8 (Secret Diary of a Call Girl) =

- Secret Diary of a Call Girl episode
- Episode no.: Series 1 Episode 8
- Directed by: Sue Tully
- Written by: Lucy Prebble
- Original air date: 15 November 2007
- Running time: 22 minutes

Guest appearances
- Colin Salmon as Mitchell Rothman; Kim Thomson as Della; Sara Stewart as Fiona; Ting-Ting Hu as Anna; Toyah Willcox as Gail Baxter; Stuart Organ as Niall Baxter

Episode chronology
| ← Previous "Episode 1.7" | Next → "Episode 2.1" |

"Episode 1.8" is the series 1 finale of the British television show Secret Diary of a Call Girl.

The episode was filmed in August 2007.

== Plot ==
The episode begins with Hannah Baxter, working under the name "Belle", staying at the London apartment of a wealthy American businessman named Mitchell Rothman. Whilst talking Mitchell suggests that Hannah should become a courtesan, and he offers her for nomination at Diamond International Courtesans.

Della, Fiona and Anna of Diamond International Courtesans agree an interview with Hannah, discussing the prerequisites needed to be a courtesan. "Up-market quality", various languages and impeccable etiquette are all required for Hannah to be accepted into the "sisterhood" of courtesans. Despite the interview going poorly, Hannah convinces her interviewers to accept her into Diamond International Courtesans. After being accepted into the sisterhood she meets Stephanie, her agent, and quits her job as a call girl. Mitchell, a jet setter who rarely stays in London, offers Hannah his penthouse situated on the south bank the River Thames, opposite the Palace of Westminster.

Ben meets up with Hannah and photographs her for Diamond International Courtesans profile. Hannah then sifts through her applicants and arranges interviews with a select few number of men; Hannah settles with four clients, including Mitchell, as the more clients a courtesan has, the less prestigious she becomes.

Mitchell then takes Hannah to a stately home in Scotland with him; however he becomes frustrated with her for being too "demanding". Hannah returns to London after the disastrous trip to Scotland and telephones Della. They discuss Mitchell, who is described by Della as a "collector", meaning he has various courtesans and prostitutes scattered around the world. Hannah then invites Ben round to the apartment and the two begin to feud, as Ben's fiancée Vanessa is irritated with Ben due to him staying at Hannah's at midnight.

Hannah, frustrated with her job, decides escorting is her vocation and moves back to her old flat, leaving Mitchell a note saying, "I'm sorry Mitch - it's not for me". Hannah then becomes an independent escort, without the help of an agency.

== Broadcast and reception ==
=== Broadcast ratings ===
The episode, the Series 1 finale, became the first episode of Secret Diary of a Call Girl that failed to grasp over 1 million viewers according to Broadcasters' Audience Research Board ratings. The episode's viewers were 985,000, however this number, although the lowest of Series 1, still beats every episode figure of Series 2, which managed to hold on to much fewer audiences. Additionally, although a series low for viewing figures, it was still the highest rated programme in terms of viewing figures that week for ITV2.

=== Reception ===
Entertainment Weekly praised the episode, calling it a "great season finale" however it noted a resemblance to an earlier plot storyline in Episode 5, saying "[Hannah] found out that [Mitchell] had a whore in every city, and she quit Diamond International. Hannah couldn't take not being number one or the only one. (Hmmm...sound like what happened with Ash and Naomi?)". The quote referenced her oldest client Ashok switching call girls to Naomi, as a result, Hannah severed her ties with Naomi.

Television blogs such as TV Squad also praised the episode, noting that the "courtesan storyline worked rather brilliantly this episode". However it criticised the series as a whole in some areas, such as the lack of character development for Hannah's clients, stating "when we only see [the clients] for a few scenes in a single episode, they come off as one-dimensional. For example, who is this Mitchell person? Belle seems to have such a chummy relationship with him, yet the only person she ever mentioned in any affectionate way was Ashok."
