= Maggie Lloyd-Williams =

Zimbabwean actress (born 1975)

Maggie Lloyd Williams
- Born: Maggie Lloyd Williams; 1975 (age 50–51); Masvingo, Zimbabwe
- Occupations: Actress, author
- Years active: 1985–2012
- Notable work: Silent Witness

Maggie Lloyd Williams (born 1975) is a Zimbabwean actress and author. She is best known for the roles in television serials, such as Silent Witness, Secret Diary of a Call Girl, Red Cap, and The Low Down.

== Personal life ==
She was born in 1975 in Masvingo, Zimbabwe.

== Filmography ==
Year	Film	Role	Genre	Ref.
2000	Dirty Work	Sian	TV series	
2000	The Low Down	Jean	Film	
2000	Gettin Off	Nazzy	TV series	
2001	The Glass	Secretary	TV series	
2002	Sirens	Ruth Lacey	TV series	
2002	Silent Witness, Tell no Tales, Part 1 & 2	Selina Thompson	TV series	
2003	Gameboys	Jenny	TV series	
2003	The Vice	Jenny	TV series	
2003	Red Cap	Corporal Angie Ogden	TV series	
2005	Doctors	Zara Vincent	TV series	
2005	Murphy's Law	Leedham	TV series	
2005	EastEnders	Gaynor	TV series	
2006	Casualty	Merlene Jackson / Rachel Skinner / Sandra	TV series	
2007	The Bill	Pamela Kervin / Cathy Fisher	TV series	
2007	Secret Diary of a Call Girl	Yolanda	TV series	
2012	Magpie Sings the Blues	Ella	Short film	

== See also ==
- Sparkleshark
