= Mary de Cork =

1929 novel by Joseph Kessel

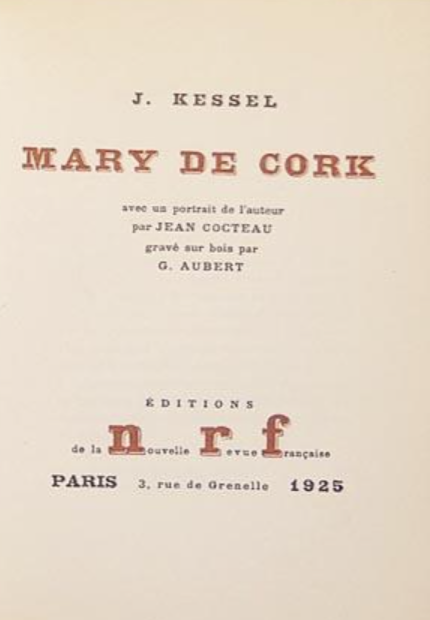
- Title page for Mary de Cork (1925)
- Author: Joseph Kessel
- Publisher: Gallimard
- Publication date: 1925

Mary de Cork is a short novel by French author Joseph Kessel, published in 1925 by Gallimard.

== Film adaptation ==
The 1967 telefilm adaptation starred Alain Bouvette and Pascal Bressy and was directed by Catherine Deneuve. The 1989 telefilm adaptation starred Valérie Mairesse and was directed by Robin Davis and Bernard-Pierre Donnadieu.
