= Joseph Kessel =

French writer (1898–1979)

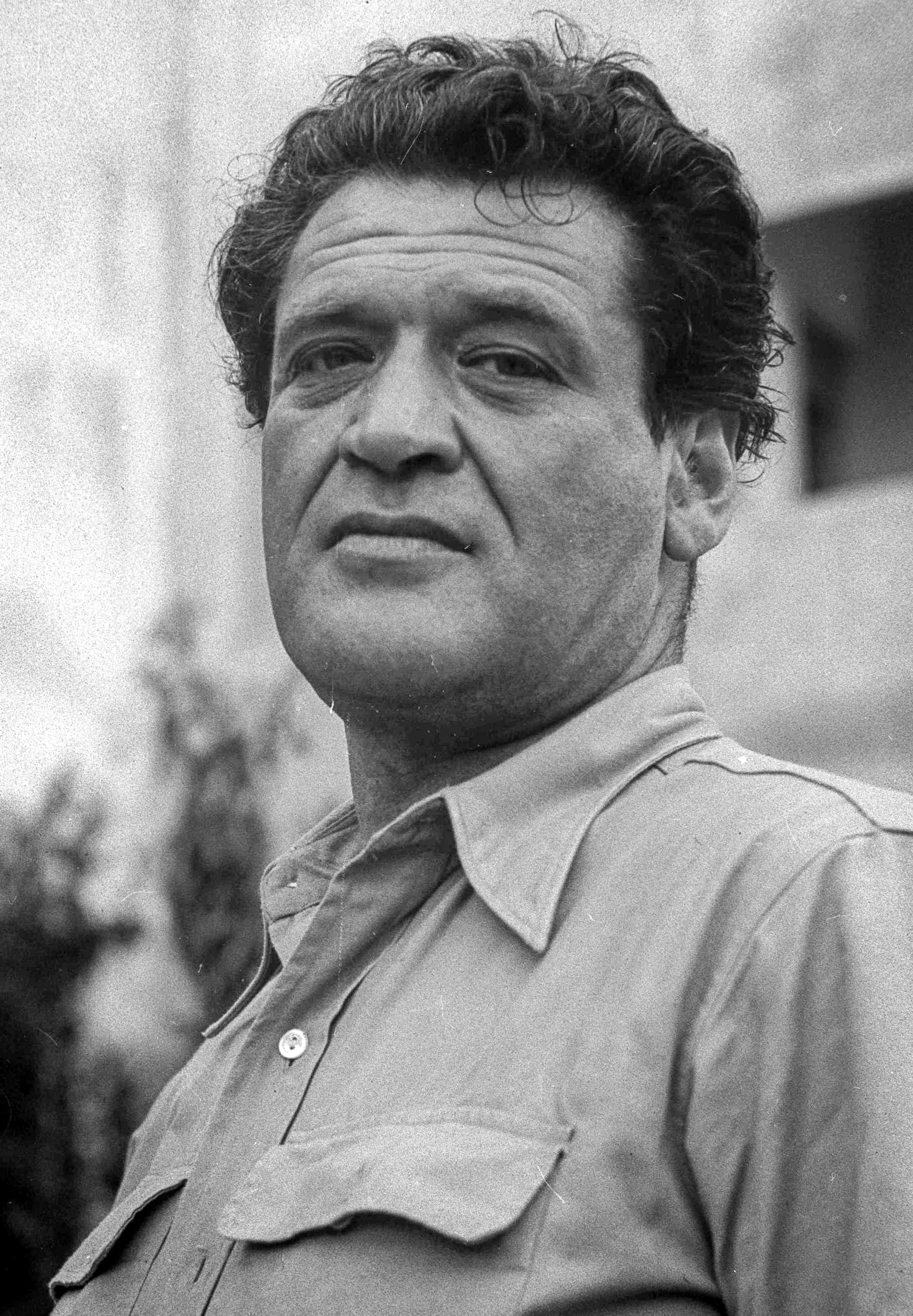
- Kessel in June 1948
- Born: 10 February 1898; Villa Clara, Entre Ríos, Argentina
- Died: 23 July 1979 (aged 81); Avernes, Val-d'Oise, France
- Military career
- Allegiance: France; Free France
- Branch: French Naval Aviation; Free French Air Forces
- Service years: 1914–1918; 1939–1945
- Conflicts: World War I; World War II
- Awards: Legion of Honour
- Other work: Journalist; Writer

Joseph Kessel (10 February 1898 – 23 July 1979), also known as "Jef", was a French journalist and novelist. He was a member of the Académie française and Grand Officer of the Legion of Honour.

== Biography ==
Kessel was born to a Jewish family in Villa Clara, Entre Ríos, Argentina, because of the constant journeys of his father, a Litvak physician. From 1905 to 1908, Joseph Kessel lived the first years of his childhood in Orenburg, Russia, before the family moved to France in 1908. He studied in lycée Masséna, Nice and lycée Louis-le-Grand, Paris and took part in the First World War as an aviator. He was also an aviator during the Second World War, in the Free French Groupe de Bombardement n° 1/20 "Lorraine" (342 Squadron RAF) with RAF Bomber Command, with Romain Gary, who was also a talented French novelist.

Kessel wrote several novels and books that were later adapted into films, notably Belle de Jour (by Luis Buñuel in 1967) and L'armée des ombres (Army of Shadows) (by Jean-Pierre Melville in 1969). In 1943 he and his nephew Maurice Druon translated Anna Marly's song Chant des Partisans into French from its original Russian. The song became one of the anthems of Free French Forces during the Second World War.

Kessel also occasionally worked as a reporter, covering Sinn Féin, the rise of the Nazis in Germany, and the Pétain trial.

Kessel was elected to the Académie française in 1962 and died on 23 July 1979 in Avernes, Val-d'Oise of a ruptured aneurysm. He is buried in Paris in the Cimetière du Montparnasse. The Joseph-Kessel Prize (Prix Joseph Kessel) is a prestigious prize in French language literature, given to "a book of a high literary value written in French". The jury counts or has counted among its members Tahar Ben Jelloun, Jean-Marie Drot, Michèle Kahn, Pierre Haski, Gilles Lapouge, Michel Le Bris, Érik Orsenna, Patrick Rambaud, Jean-Christophe Rufin, André Velter and Olivier Weber.

== Bibliography ==
- La steppe rouge (1922)
- The Crew (1923)
- Au camp des vaincus ou la critique du 11 mai (1924)
- Mary de Cork (1925)
- Les captifs (1926; Grand Prix du roman de l'Académie française)
- Nuits de princes (1927)
- Belle de Jour (1928; it inspired Luis Buñuel's 1967 movie of the same name)
- Vent de sable (1929)
- Fortune carrée (1932)
- Le coup de grâce (1931; made into the movie Sirocco in 1951 with Humphrey Bogart)
- Wagon-lit (1932)
- La Passante du Sans-Souci (1936; turned into a movie by Jacques Rouffio in 1982)
- Hollywood, Ville mirage (Gallimard, NRF, 1936)
- Mermoz (1938)
- L'Armée des ombres (1943; adapted for a movie by Jean-Pierre Melville in 1969); Army of Shadows (Contra Mundum Press: 2017), featuring an intro by Stuart Kendall
- Le Bataillon du ciel (Sky Battalion), (1946; turned into a movie by Alexander Esway in 1947): Free French SAS paratroopers in Brittany in Summer 1944
- Le tour du malheur (1950)
- Les Amants du Tage (1954)
- La Vallée des Rubis (1955)
- Le lion (English translation: The Lion; 1958)
- Les mains du miracle (Gallimard, 1960). (English translation: The Man with the Miraculous Hands. Translated by Weaver, Helen. Farrar, Straus and Cudahy. 1961. OCLC 630284.)
- Les cavaliers (1967) (English translation: The Horsemen. Translated by Patrick O'Brian. New York: Farrar, Straus & Giroux, 1968) (filmed as The Horsemen in 1971.)
- Kisling 1891-1953 (1971) avec Henri Troyat
- Partout un ami (1972)
- Des hommes (1972)
- Les temps sauvages (1975)
- The escape

== Filmography ==
- The Crew, directed by Maurice Tourneur (France, 1928, based on the novel The Crew)
- Nuits de princes, directed by Marcel L'Herbier (France, 1930, based on the novel Nuits de princes)
- The Crew, directed by Anatole Litvak (France, 1935, based on the novel The Crew)
- The Woman I Love, directed by Anatole Litvak (1937, based on the novel The Crew)
- Nuits de princes, directed by Vladimir Strizhevsky (France, 1938, based on the novel Nuits de princes)
- Le Bataillon du ciel, directed by Alexander Esway (France, 1947, based on the novel Le Bataillon du ciel)
- Sirocco, directed by Curtis Bernhardt (1951, based on the novel Le coup de grâce)
- The Lovers of Lisbon, directed by Henri Verneuil (France, 1955, based on the novel Les Amants du Tage)
- Fortune carrée, directed by Bernard Borderie (France, 1955, based on the novel Fortune carrée)
- The Lion, directed by Jack Cardiff (1962, based on the novel The Lion)
- Belle de Jour, directed by Luis Buñuel (France, 1967, based on the novel Belle de Jour)
- Army of Shadows, directed by Jean-Pierre Melville (France, 1969, based on the novel L'Armée des ombres)
- The Horsemen, directed by John Frankenheimer (1971, based on the novel Les Cavaliers)
- The Passerby, directed by Jacques Rouffio (France, 1982, based on the novel La Passante du Sans-Souci)

=== Screenwriter ===
- Cease Firing (dir. Jacques de Baroncelli, France, 1934)
- Mayerling (dir. Anatole Litvak, France, 1936)
- Les Bateliers de la Volga (dir. Vladimir Strizhevsky, France, 1936)
- La Peur (dir. Victor Tourjansky, France, 1936)
- The Secrets of the Red Sea (dir. Richard Pottier, France, 1937)
- The Man from Niger (dir. Jacques de Baroncelli, France, 1940)
- At the Grand Balcony (dir. Henri Decoin, France, 1949)
- Le Grand Cirque (dir. Georges Péclet, France, 1950)
- Act of Love (dir. Anatole Litvak, 1953)
- Oasis (dir. Yves Allégret, France, 1955)
- La Passe du diable (dir. Pierre Schoendoerffer and Jacques Dupont, France, 1958)
- The Night of the Generals (dir. Anatole Litvak, 1967)
