= Avril MacRory =

Irish television executive (1956–2025)

Avril MacRory (5 April 1956 – 14 July 2025) was an Irish television executive, producer and director.

== Early life ==
Born in Ardkeen Hospital in Waterford on 5 April 1956, McRory was the eldest of four children and grew up in nearby Tramore. She attended the local Stella Maris Convent School before moving to the Dominican College Sion Hill in Dublin. MacRory completed a Bachelor of Arts in University College Dublin in 1978.

== Career ==
MacRory joined RTÉ as a trainee producer/director in 1979 and worked on Glenroe and Bosco amongst other programmes. She later worked with Bob Geldof on Self Aid, a concert modelled on Live Aid and broadcast in May 1986 as an unemployment benefit concert. MacRory was appointed head of variety, including entertainment and music, at RTÉ in 1986.

After moving to England in 1988, MacRory joined Channel 4 where she was appointed commissioning editor for music. Five years later she became head of music television at the BBC. She was co-executive producer of the Global Broadcaster Consortium from 1998 to 2000 and was the executive producer for the BBC's millennium coverage, under the global 2000 Today banner.

MacRory left the BBC in 2001 and set up her own independent production company called Silverapples Media. She was executive producer of the TV series Secret Diary of a Call Girl featuring Billie Piper. MacRory was also an executive producer of the 2004 documentary Shadowing the Third Man, which was awarded a Gold Medal at the Rome Film Festival in 2006. She was producer and director at the first performance by Celtic Woman in Dublin.

== Personal life and death ==
MacRory married Val Griffin, a floor manager at RTÉ, on 9 July 1983. Their son Sam was born in 1985.

In 2017, MacRory was diagnosed with cancer and underwent several operations. She died at Royal Trinity Hospice in Clapham Common, on 14 July 2025, at the age of 69.
