= Red Cap (TV series) =

British military TV drama

- Genre: Drama
- Created by: Patrick Harbinson
- Starring: Tamzin Outhwaite; Douglas Hodge; James Thornton; Gordon Kennedy; Blake Ritson; Raquel Cassidy; Poppy Miller
- Opening theme: "5/4" — Gorillaz (Pilot) "Set the Record Straight" — Reef (Series)
- Composers: Hal Lindes; Sheridan Tongue
- Country of origin: United Kingdom
- Original language: English
- No. of series: 2
- No. of episodes: 13

Production
- Executive producers: Patrick Harbinson; Gareth Neame; Mike Dormer; William Davies
- Producer: Sarah Wilson
- Cinematography: Gordon Hickie
- Editors: Paul Knight; Ian Farr; Xavier Russell
- Running time: 60 minutes (Series 1); 50 minutes (Series 2)
- Production company: Stormy Pictures

Original release
- Network: BBC One
- Release: 7 January 2003 – 12 February 2004

Red Cap is a British drama television series, produced by Stormy Pictures for the BBC and broadcast on BBC One. A total of thirteen episodes were broadcast over the course of two series, beginning with a feature-length pilot on 28 December 2001. The series follows the investigations and personal relationships of a British Army Special Investigation Branch unit of the Royal Military Police based in Germany.

The series initially focused on lead character, Sergeant Jo McDonagh (Tamzin Outhwaite), who was nicknamed McDoughnut, but later episodes played out as more of an ensemble piece, with several notable characters coming to prominence. A number of fictional regiments were featured in the series, including the Bedford Light Infantry, the Royal Cumbrian Fusiliers, the Wessex Regiment and the Derbyshire Light Infantry.

== Cast ==
- Tamzin Outhwaite as Sgt. Jo McDonagh
- Douglas Hodge as Sgt. Maj. Kenneth "Kenny" Burns
- James Thornton as Staff Sgt. Philip "Hippy" Roper
- Gordon Kennedy as Sgt. Bruce Hornsby
- Joachim Raaf as Detective Thomas Strauss
- William Beck as Sgt. Maj. Steve Forney
- Maggie Lloyd-Williams as Cpl. Angie Ogden
- Peter Guinness as Capt. Gavin Howard
- Blake Ritson as Lt. Giles Vicary
- Raquel Cassidy as Staff Sgt. Neve Kirland (Series 1)
- Poppy Miller as Staff Sgt. Harriet Frost (Series 2)
- Ian Burfield as Sgt. Sam Perkins (Series 1)

== Episodes ==
=== Pilot (2001) ===
No.	Title	Directed by	Written by	British air date	UK viewers (million)
1	"Red Cap"	David Richards	Patrick Harbinson	28 December 2001	8.41
Cpl. Jo McDonagh finds her first day as an acting sergeant in SIB eventful when she and Sgt Hornsby investigate a paratrooper's lover over duty free booze being stolen and sold on outside of base. Meanwhile, Cpl Stephen Ambrose (Martin Cole) is hospitalised after being chased down the autobahn by German polizei and crashing into a road block. The owner of the car that Ambrose was driving, Kirsten Railton-Ulmke, the daughter of a German general and wife of Cpt. Dominic Railton (Tom Ward), is reported missing and is later found murdered. Ambrose awakens in hospital and claims to have been having an affair with Kirsten, and informs Jo that she was being blackmailed in order for the affair to be kept a secret. Jo suspects Rachel Strang (Carol Starks), Dominic's physio, of being behind the blackmail and tries to prove her involvement in the murder.

=== Series 1 (2003) ===
No.	Title	Directed by	Written by	British air date	UK viewers (million)
1	"H-Hour"	Justin Chadwick	Patrick Harbinson	7 January 2003	6.90
During a live-firing exercise, Andy Walden (Sean-Paul Browne), a private with the Bedford Light Infantry, is killed. Lance Corporal Darren Stowe (Mel Raido), a member of Walden's platoon, admits to firing the shot which killed him, but the team are convinced that Walden's death was more than just an accident. When further investigation reveals that Stowe was high on LSD at the time of the incident, platoon Sergeant Gary Jennings (Mark Lewis Jones) comes under fire from SIB. Meanwhile, finding himself shorthanded, Burns grudgingly reinstates Jo back to the rank of sergeant, and offers her a permanent position within SIB. Jo is dismayed, however, when her first assignment is to investigate the theft of a regimental mascot known as Augustus the 14th. Determined to prove herself a worthy member of the team, Jo sets about her own course of investigation.
2	"Crush"	Justin Chadwick	Patrick Harbinson	14 January 2003	6.39
Whilst driving an army truck full of Royal Cumbrian Fusiliers back from a three-day exercise during the dead of night, an exhausted Tracey Walters (Joanne Froggatt), a private with the Royal Logistic Corps, strikes a civilian car, resulting in the death of both of its occupants. Strauss suspects that Walters either fell asleep at the wheel, or simply lost concentration. Jo isn't convinced by his theory, and the discovery of traces of flash explosives on the road next to the crash site suggests there may be more to the story than initially meets the eye. Jo suspects Private Bernie Maddox (Chris O'Dowd), a loner with a chequered past, may somehow be involved, and sets about questioning Maddox's fellow squaddies, including Dan Coulthard (Nigel Harman). Meanwhile, Roper is surprised when blood tests show that the driver of the civilian car was neither intoxicated nor high.
3	"Espirit de Corps"	Justin Chadwick	Patrick Harbinson & Ben Rostful	21 January 2003	6.00
A German police sergeant, Willi Hartung, is shot dead during a failed bank robbery, the latest in a long line of similar crimes. Later that day, Corporal Luke Gemill, a driver assigned to Lieutenant Colonel John Cosgrove (Julian Wadham) of the Wessex Regiment, is found dead in a multi-storey car park, having seemingly taken his own life. While the two cases initially appear unconnected, SIB discover they are very much linked through the use of a batch of stolen army guns, which have found their way out of a recycling armoury being run by RQMS Rufus Webb (Stuart Bowman). When new evidence comes to light suggesting Gemill was murdered, Roper pays a visit to a former German football star, Hans-Jakob Kramer (Carsten Voigt), who hired a car to Gemill shortly before his death. When Jo discovers evidence to suggest Kramer is fencing the illegal guns, SIB organise a raid on his showroom.
4	"Cover Story"	Martin Hutchings	Patrick Harbinson	28 January 2003	6.18
A Daily Mail journalist, Theresa Brock, goes missing whilst following the lives of the Derbyshires on a chemical warfare exercise. When her body is discovered several hours later, forensics reveal that she seemingly died of inhalation of CS gas. Captain Finbar Glover (Richard Dillane), who was leading the exercise, takes responsibility for Brock's death, seemingly passing it off as a horrific accident. However when investigations reveal that she was not who she claimed to be, and that her protective gas mask had been tampered with, a murder investigation is launched, and suspicion turns towards Sgt Chris Roxborough (Ray Stevenson), who had have an affair with 'Theresa'. Meanwhile, Burns assigns Jo to investigate a naked picture sent in to the local rag by a group of squaddies, and Vicary clashes with an old friend, Corporal Killian (Del Synnott).
5	"Cold War"	Martin Hutchings	Patrick Harbinson	4 February 2003	6.45
Captain Emily Garnett (Lucy Russell) is kidnapped from the base whilst on her way to meet a group of friends. Three days later, she stumbles into a live firing exercise, but escapes unharmed. Recovering in hospital, Garnett says that she was attacked by a masked man who held her in a country house close to a railway line. Later, Kenny receives word that during her incarceration, Garnett's login details were used to access classified army information. Jo suspects Garnett's hobby of selling war medals may be related to the kidnap. Roper receives word from SS Spy Megan Rhodes (Lucy Cohu) that he is under threat from an IRA informant, Liam Young (Finbar Lynch). Young has leaked information to the press, and since he investigated him during his time in Ireland, Roper is concerned that his son's safety may be at risk if Liam tries to contact him.
6	"Payback"	Martin Hutchings	James Mavor	11 February 2003	7.41
Private George McKewan (Joe Renton) absconds after assaulting his senior officer following the discovery of a quantity of drugs hidden in army postal transport crates due to be shipped out of the base in Germany back to the UK. Meanwhile, Lt Col Alan Fox (William Scott-Masson) is summoned to the base by a prank caller, only for his shiny new BMW to be stolen from the base car park. Kenny offers to help to an old friend, Sgt Sandy Harmon (Tom Mannion), who has been court martialled after assaulting his senior officer whilst on a tour of Kosovo. Whilst on the trail of McKewan, Jo and Roper witness a meeting involving McKewan and a shady Russian figure, Turgut Ata. When Strauss reveals Ata is the target of an ongoing police operation to catch a gang of sex traffickers, all three cases suddenly collide with shocking consequences for the team.

=== Series 2 (2004) ===
No.	Title	Directed by	Written by	British air date	UK viewers (million)
1	"Betrayed"	Justin Chadwick	Patrick Harbinson	8 January 2004	6.61
Having accepted a transfer to close protection, Jo finds herself in Bosnia on an international operation to capture wanted war criminal Radan Vladic. At a remote farmhouse where her team prepare to arrest Vladic, they find the slain remains of an advance SAS team, seemingly murdered in an ambush. After much persuasion from Jo, SAS Major Tim Garvey (Pip Torrens) agrees for SIB to take on the case. A team, headed by acting W02 Harriet Frost (Poppy Miller) are sent to Bosnia to investigate. Meanwhile, Jo has found herself a new beau in the form of Kieran Amis (Daniel Lapaine), a British construction worker. As the investigation gets underway, Roper discovers audiotape evidence which suggests that the location of the SAS team was leaked by an inside man. Jo is mortified when the voice on the tape is identified as Kieran's, and sets about uncovering the truth.
2	"True Love"	Justin Chadwick	James Mavor & Will Davies	15 January 2004	6.25
While boar-hunting, Lance Corporal Clive Morrigan becomes the victim of a rogue gunman. Initial investigation suggests that at the time of his death, Morrigan was engaged in an affair with Captain Helen Springer (Natasha Dahlberg). Subsequently, suspicion turns towards his wife, Cassie (Kay Bridgeman) and Springer's husband Mark (Dominic Mafham). The investigation takes a surprising turn when Helen subsequently disappears, and her husband's car, containing hair fibres and blood traces, is found beside a railway line 50 miles from base. While Harriet is convinced of Mark's guilt, Jo focuses her efforts on another target, Cpl Jake Tollman (Ian Dunn), who she finds rifling through Helen's private possessions in her quarters office. Meanwhile, as Jo and Hippy's feelings for each other continue to grow, Bruce finally plucks up the courage to ask Angie out.
3	"Red Light"	Justin Chadwick	Patrick Harbinson & Nick Harding	22 January 2004	6.00
When Corporal Mike Fryman falls to his death from the top floor balcony of a city hotel, Bruce finds himself becoming emotionally connected with the case, having previously been in a relationship with hotel manager Mira Schellenhaus (Feo Aladag). When teenager Anna Veseli is later found dead nearby, having been the victim of a forced overdose, Fryman's motives for being at the hotel on the night of his death are called into question. Jo discovers that Fryman was involved in the sale of stolen army supplies, and was being blackmailed by Sgt Stuart Hodnett (Anthony Flanagan), who in return for his silence, agreed that Fryman would hand over two teenage girls that he rescued while on duty in Kosovo to a sex work ring being run by Captain Rolf Mertens. As Bruce's involvement with Mira is uncovered, Captain Howard has no choice but to reassign him.
4	"Fighting Fit"	Justin Chadwick	Steve Bailie & Will Davies	29 January 2004	5.41
When Private Damon Swinton dies during routine platoon exercise, suspicion falls upon his unpopular sergeant, Lennie Raeburn (Geff Francis), who has a reputation amongst his men for having a short fuse. When evidence suggests that Swinton was pushed from the riverbank where he died, Raeburn is immediately considered as the prime suspect. However, a post mortem on the victim reveals that he in fact died from a brain haemorrhage, caused by clotting which occurred as a result of a beating some seven days previously, and investigations lead McDonagh and Roper to the location of an underground fight circuit, where Swinton was being trained as a fighter by fellow private Robbie McCoy (Neil Jackson). As evidence of an extortion racket comes to light, Private Oliver Teale (Aled Pugh) disappears and Corporal Jason Dwyer is found badly beaten.
5	"Friendly Fire"	Justin Chadwick	Patrick Harbinson	5 February 2004	4.85
When Lance Corporal Paul Engels is killed by a stray mortar, and Sgt Charlie Fleckner (Andrew Tiernan) narrowly escapes, SIB are called in to investigate what appears to be a tragic accident. But it soon becomes clear that there are just too many suspicions to write off Engels's death - suspicions that are compounded when Engels's brother, Darren (Darren Morfitt) claims Fleckner's innocence might not be that clear cut. The team's investigations lead them to photographs that indicate Engels and Fleckner shared a secret - they were involved in an apparent war crime in Iraq, which appears to have been buried by their commanding officer, Captain Dorian MacKesy (Tristan Gemmill). However, the situation soon escalates when the team uncovers evidence of an illicit love affair that involves blackmail, betrayal and retribution. Jo and Roper's relationship intensifies.
6	"Long Time Dead"	Justin Chadwick	Charlie Fletcher	12 February 2004	5.11
Private Simon Barham decides to celebrate his 19th birthday by taking the wheel of an armoured personnel carrier while blind drunk and tearing through the base like a madman. When Barham crashes the vehicle into an abandoned communications building, the team arrive at the scene only to discover that the accident has uncovered a mummified corpse hidden in a ventilation pipe. The corpse is identified as one Private Exner, who had supposedly gone AWOL the night before his unit were deployed to Iraq, following a fight with fellow private Stevie Stebbings over his involvement in cannabis cultivation. His platoon sergeant, Terry Canavan (Bryan Dick), claims to have received a phone call from him three days after he was last seen, but when his version of events is called into question, suspicion turns towards Stevie's widow Tricia (Georgia Taylor).

== Production ==
According to BBC sources, Outhwaite spent a week familiarising herself with army life at the Reserve Training and Mobilisation Centre in Chilwell, Nottingham, prior to filming. Training included unarmed combat, 9mm pistol training, driving, drill, and understanding the army's labyrinthine hierarchical structure. The series creator and writer, Emmy and Golden Globe nominee Patrick Harbinson, was in the army himself and previously wrote 15 episodes of the ITV military series Soldier Soldier. A BBC spokesman said; "With such experience, Patrick infuses Red Cap with a tangible sense of realism."

On 13 March 2004 Red Cap was axed by BBC executives, who cited: "At a cost of £10 million and an audience of just 5.5 million, executives thought it would not be worthwhile to renew it for another series."
