= Michèle Kahn =

French writer (born 1940)

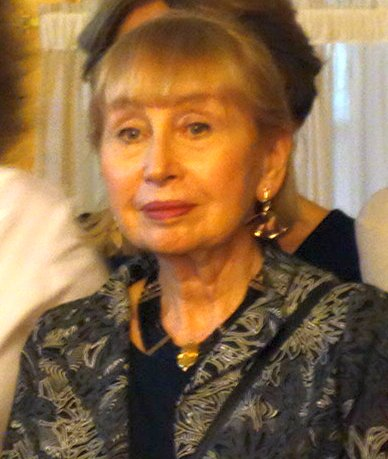
Michèle Kahn

Michèle Kahn (born 1 December 1940 in Nice) is a French writer who later lived in Strasbourg and currently in Paris. She first wrote books for the young (about a hundred), and mainly addressed the adult public from 1997.

== Biography ==
A graduate from the École des hautes études en sciences sociales (EHESS), Kahn was vice-president of the Société des gens de lettres as well as of the Société civile des auteurs multimédia (SCAM). Co-founder of the Rotary Prize for Literature, founding member of the SCAM Prix Joseph Kessel and the Prix François Billetdoux, of which she is currently the President, she is Vice-President of the Prix des Romancières and a member of various other literary juries.

A member of the Chocolate Crunchers Club, she was appointed in 2003 as Ambassador of the Académie du Chocolat of Bayonne.

As a journalist, she collaborated with Le Magazine Littéraire from 1987 to 2006 and L'Arche from 1993 to 2010. She is a blogger for The Times of Israel in French.

A Michèle Kahn library was established in 1997 for the youth by the Alliance israélite universelle in Paris, which also collects her archives.

In 2009, she signed a petition in support of director Roman Polanski, calling for his release after he was arrested in Switzerland in relation to his 1977 charge for drugging and raping a 13-year-old girl.

== Bibliography ==
=== Youth ===
- 1994 and 1995: Contes et légendes de la Bible, in two volumes. Volume I : Du jardin d'Éden à la Terre promise. Volume II : Judges, Kings and Prophets, Pocket Jeunesse.
- 2000 and 2004: La vague noire, a novel that takes place in France during the Second World War and includes the account of a girl deported to Auschwitz, Actes Sud Junior. Prix des Incorruptibles 2001.
- 2005: Les trésors de la Bible, from Adam to King Solomon, The main biblical heroes, Pocket Jeunesse.
- 2006: Justice pour le capitaine Dreyfus, day to day, the story of a struggle for justice and truth, Oskar Jeunesse.

=== Novels ===
- 1986: Hôtel Riviera, a novel about a woman who, soon to be 40 year, takes stock of her life, Grasset.
- 1989: Rue du Roi doré, Ramsay.
- 1997: Shanghaï-la-juive, Flammarion.
- 1998: Les fantômes de Zurich, from Hong Kong to Zurich, a contemporary story between paparazzi and ancient Nazis, Flammarion.
- 1999: Savannah, a quest for identity woven with the history of the city, Flammarion.
- 2000: La Pourpre et le Jasmin, or the novel of Queen Esther, biblical heroine at the time of the Persian Empire, Éditions du Rocher.
- 2000: Le Shnorrer de la rue des Rosiers, revival of the Rue du Roi doré: A beggar listens to the (true) story of a happy man, survivor of various concentration camps, éditions Bibliophane-Daniel Radford.divers
- 2002: Le Grand Dragon, inspired by an American story about the Ku Klux Klan, éditions Bibliophane-Daniel Radford.
- 2003: Cacao, the history of chocolate through the trial that took place at the end of the 18th century in Bayonne, éditions Bibliophane-Daniel Radford. Prix Cœur de la France 2003.
- 2004: Moi, reine de Saba, voyage of Queen of Sheba to King Solomon and monotheism, éditions Bibliophane-Daniel Radford.
- 2005: Cacao, éditions Biblipoche.
- 2005: Le Roman de Séville, the history of Seville from antiquity to our days, through the fate of the characters and myths that forged its destiny, Éditions du Rocher. Prix Alberto Benveniste 2006.
- 2006: Shanghaï-la-juive, the story of thousands of Jewish Europeans, hunted down by the Nazis, who found refuge in Shanghai in the 1940s., Éditions du Rocher.
- 2006: Justice pour le capitaine Dreyfus !, Oskar Éditions.
- 2007: La Tragédie de l’Emeraude : 15 janvier 1934, Saigon - Paris, Éditions du Rocher. The history of the Dewoitine D.332 L'Émeraude crash in 1934
- 2010: Quand vous reviendrez, aurons-nous une auto ?, the story of a Jewish boy during the Second World War, Éditions du Seuil.
- 2010: Le Petit roman du mariage, a journey in time and space around the stages of the Great Day, whether the marriage is civil or religious, Éditions du Rocher.
- 2010: Le Rabbin de Salonique, A fictionalized biography of Zvi Koretz, Grand rabbi of the community of Thessaloniki during the Second World War, a controversial figure of the "History of the Jews in Thessaloniki", Éditions du Rocher.
- 2010: new edition of Shanghaï-la-juive (see above), Éditions du Rocher.
- 2010: Les Prunes de Tirana, short story about the trip to Albania, in 1986, of a delegation of French writers Publie.net
- 2011: Le Shnorrer de la rue des Rosiers (see above), Publie.net
- 2011: Justice pour le capitaine Dreyfus ! (see above), pocket edition, Oskar Éditions.
- 2011: KKK Le Grand Dragon (see above), Publie.net,
- 2011: Cacao, (see above), Publie.net,
- 2012: new edition of Cacao, (see above), Éditions Cairn
- 2014: La clandestine du voyage de Bougainville, or the history of Jeanne Baré, The first woman to go around the world. Éditions Le Passage Prix Marc Elder 2015.
- 2015: new edition of Shanghaï-la-juive (see above). Éditions Le Passage.

== See also ==
- Shanghai Ghetto
