= Belle de Jour (novel) =

1928 novel by Joseph Kessel

- Author: Joseph Kessel
- Language: French
- Publisher: Gallimard
- Publication date: 1928
- English publication date: 1962
- ISBN: 9782070361250; 1972 reprint (French)
- OCLC: 1158458772
- Preceded by: Nuits de princes
- Followed by: Vent de sable

Belle de Jour is a novel by French author Joseph Kessel, published in 1928 by Gallimard.

== Plot ==
Séverine Sérizy recalls a mechanic touching her when she was an eight-year-old girl on her way from her bedroom to that of her mother. Now, a young, beautiful housewife, Séverine finds it difficult to fulfill her masochistic desires with her husband, Pierre. Although they love each other, physical intimacy is a problem, which frustrates them both.

When Monsieur Husson mentions an acquaintance who works at a local brothel, Séverine becomes curious about prostitution as a means of satisfying her desires. She uses the pseudonym "Belle de Jour" (Beautiful by Day), as she works from two to five o'clock each day, returning to her unaware husband in the evening.

Séverine becomes entangled with one of her clients, Marcel, a young gangster. He provides her with the thrills and excitement of her fantasies. The situation becomes more complicated when Séverine decides to leave the brothel, with Madame Anaïs's agreement, after Marcel becomes too demanding and jealous of her husband.

Husson has also discovered her secret as a potential, though unwilling, client. After one of Marcel's associates tracks Séverine to her home, he visits her there and threatens to reveal her hidden identity, but Séverine persuades him to leave. Husson visits Severine and assures her of his discretion, but she cannot believe him. She discovers Husson has arranged to meet Pierre in the square outside Notre Dame Cathedral; she hastily visits Marcel and asks him to kill Husson, which he agrees to do, out of love for her. Marcel and Severine are driven to the rendezvous point by Marcel's friend, and Marcel attacks Husson, but the job is botched: Pierre intervenes and is stabbed instead.

Pierre survives, but he is left in a coma, from which he eventually awakes. Marcel is arrested, but he refuses to talk, thereby saving Séverine's reputation. The police attribute the motive to the unidentified Belle de Jour, and Séverine lives in terror of the eventual discovery, which is made almost certain by her maid's recognition of Marcel from his visit to their house. Pierre leaves the hospital, but he is paralyzed from the waist down. Even though Séverine has been protected from revelation of the truth by Marcel's accomplice, Hippolyte, she ultimately decides to tell Pierre what happened.

== Film adaptation ==
The 1967 film adaptation starred Catherine Deneuve, Jean Sorel and Michel Piccoli and was directed by Luis Buñuel.

== See also ==
- Belle de Jour, the pseudonym of Brooke Magnanti, who published her blog of working as a London call girl
- Secret Diary of a Call Girl, British television series based on the books of Brooke Magnanti, starring Billie Piper
- Sadism and masochism in fiction
