= Episode 1.1 (Secret Diary of a Call Girl) =

- Secret Diary of a Call Girl episode
- Hannah walking through London to meet a client
- Episode no.: Series 1 Episode 1
- Directed by: Yann Demange
- Written by: Lucy Prebble
- Original air date: 27 September 2007
- Running time: 22 minutes

Guest appearances
- Tom Mannion as Horsey Man; Tom Mison as Daniel; Lydia Fox as Estate Agent; Emily Butterfield as Rachel; Maggie Lloyd-Williams as Yolanda; Keira Malik as Tanya

Episode chronology
← Previous —	Next → "Episode 1.2"

"Episode 1.1" is the series 1 premiere of the British television show Secret Diary of a Call Girl.

The episode was filmed in May 2007.

== Plot ==
The episode begins with Hannah Baxter walking across the eastern Golden Jubilee Bridge, she is then seen entering The May Fair and heading towards the lift. Whilst doing so she narrates, telling the viewer that she is a "whore".

Hannah then wakes in her flat and begins directly addressing the audience, differentiating between herself and her alter-ego, Belle. She then continues describing her personal and professional life, her personal and professional living space and even her and Belle's contrasting fashion. However she is interrupted by a call from her agent, Stephanie, who informs her that a client will be round in 30 minutes.

The client arrives and as he does Hannah runs through her "rules" with the audience, telling what makes her a good prostitute. Hannah quickly establishes that the man has a public sex fantasy, in particular in fields and stables.

The scene then changes to a London café with red semicircular awnings, where Hannah meets her best friend and ex-boyfriend, Ben, who has no idea of her double life as a call girl and mentions the good tasting custard crusts, which he said are handmade, not machine made. Whilst walking past an estate agent's office, and Ben asks whether they should play a game of "spoilt little rich girl". The two view a luxurious London townhouse, and halfway through the tour of the property they run out.

She then meets another client at a hotel, a young man named Daniel; however, he leaves halfway through his appointment, whilst Hannah is performing fellatio on him. Stephanie, at the Floridita (closed in 2017, now the 100 Wardour Street Restaurant, Soho) later discloses that he wanted somebody with a 'girl next door' image. Hannah persuades Stephanie to book Daniel with him, yet this time she dresses in a simple manner to please him. Her next client is scheduled with her first client and when he arrives she pulls out a saddle and asks who should wear it. The episode ends with the client entirely nude aside from a saddle placed on his back as Hannah rides him like a horse.

== Broadcast and reception ==
=== Broadcast ===
The series premiere garnered an average of 1,997,000 viewers, peaking at 2.1 million. Secret Diary of a Call Girl received an 11% audience share for the 10:00 pm timeslot. Episode 1.1 gave the highest audience rates ITV2 had ever seen from a non-sports programme. Episode 1.1's viewing success has never been matched by a subsequent Secret Diary of a Call Girl episode; the closest to this was Episode 1.2 with 1,475,000. Not only was the episode a success, ranking at number 1 for ITV2's viewing figures that week, but the second highest programme that week, a Sunday repeat of The X Factor, was 870,000 viewers behind. Additionally, Secret Diary of a Call Girl's Sunday repeat ranked at 6.

=== Reception ===
The episode was mostly well received by reviewers. IGN noted the similarities between the show and Sex and the City and Piper's skill whilst breaking the fourth wall. "Piper does lots of talking to the camera, a stylistic similarity to the early episodes of Sex and the City. While that show eventually dropped Carrie's on camera monologues, Call Girl is clearly borrowing the voice from Belle's [Dr Brooke Magnanti] writings – and Piper manages to pull off what would usually seem awkward." To summarise, IGN stated it was "well written, well acted and stylish".

Slant Magazine, despite giving a positive review, mentioned that Hannah's "frequent voiceovers and direct-camera addresses turn the awkwardly named show into a how-to guide for prospective prostitutes". Concerns such as Slant Magazine's and whether the programme glamorises prostitution have been echoed throughout various publications.

Entertainment Weekly's reviewer Aubry D'Arminio stated Hannah's unwillingness to emotional engage herself with others was one of her favourite aspects of the programme, saying "Hannah doesn't want to connect with people at all.... Not allowing herself to "get close" or be "the real me" isn't a call girl's rule for Hannah (like it was for Julia [Roberts] in Pretty Woman), it's a twisted compulsion. And that's why I love the show." D'Arminio also praised Showtime, Secret Diary of a Call Girl's American broadcaster, for not simply buying format rights, saying "I'm just thankful that Showtime imported Call Girl without recasting it like its sister network CBS is doing with Worst Week of My Life or ABC did with Life on Mars."
