= Villa Clara, Entre Ríos =

Villa Clara
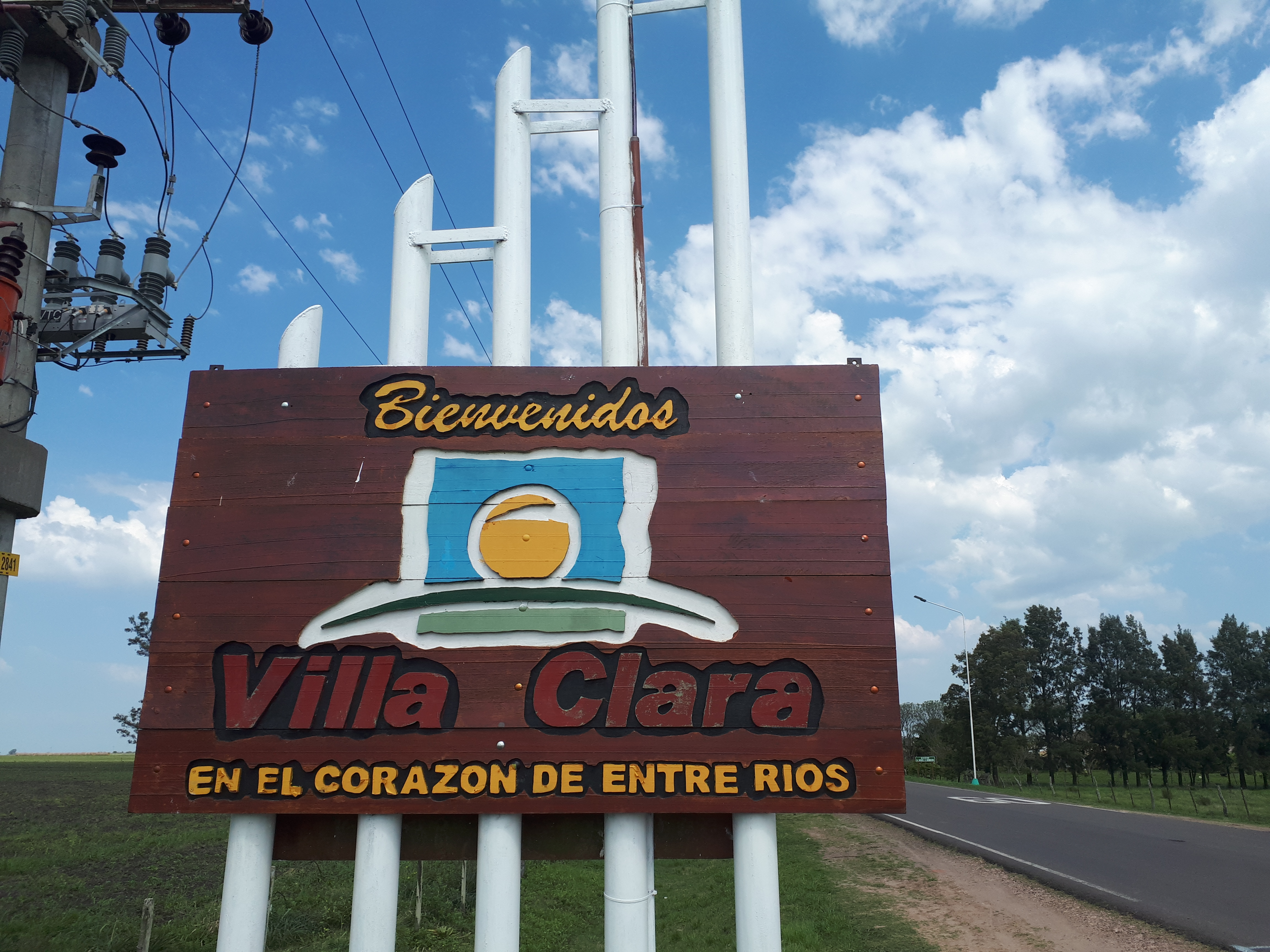

- Location within Entre Ríos Province Location within Argentina
- Country: Argentina
- Province: Entre Ríos Province
- Department: Villaguay
- Founded: 1902

Population (2022)
  - Total: 3,120
- Time zone: UTC−3 (ART)

Villa Clara is a village located in the Villaguay Department, in the center of the province of Entre Ríos, Argentina. According to the Argentine census bureau, INDEC, it had 3120 residents in 2022.

The village was named after Maurice de Hirsch's wife, Clara Bischoffsheim (1833–1899). Hirsch was a German Jewish philanthropist who sponsored large-scale Jewish emigration to Argentina.

There are objects related to the Jewish colonization of the "Colonia Clara" in the Municipal Historical Museum. There is a wide range of objects: Jewish immigration, railway, daily life, documents, etc.

The primary school n.° 84 Río Negro was created in 1911 as Escuela Nacional n.° 37 "Rio Negro". In 1978 it was transferred to the provincial government with its current name.

The French writer and journalist Joseph Kessel is from this town.
