= Online Caroline =

2000 online drama

- Author: Tim Wright, Rob Bevan and Tom Harvey
- Language: English
- Genre: Web fiction, Online drama, Electronic literature
- Publisher: Produced by XPT, also distributed by Freeserve
- Publication date: 2000-04-12
- Publication place: United Kingdom
- Award: BAFTA: Best online drama 2000
- Website: http://onlinecaroline.com

Online Caroline was a web soap opera in 24 episodes devised, written and designed by Rob Bevan and Tim Wright in 1998, and then published online by Tim Wright, Rob Bevan and Tom Harvey at the production company XPT in 2000. It was "an instant hit" and won that year's British Academy of Film and Television Arts award in the interactive category.

== Synopsis ==
Caroline is a young woman whose partner David's company, XPT, has provided her with a webcam and diary website so she can have online friends (i.e. the readers) to keep her company while David is away on a work trip. After a week David returns, but puts Caroline on a strange diet. Their relationship becomes more and more strange, with Caroline clearly being manipulated. Caroline becomes weak and ill after following the diet for a few days, and David begins to take over the website and the communication with the reader. The story ends with an email from XPT to the reader thanking them for their help.

== Inclusion of the reader in the story ==
In an early paper on Online Caroline William Cole argued that its apparent inclusion of the reader actually served to "further constrain and dictate the reader's experience."

By providing the reader with 24 daily episodes, Online Caroline mimicked the web storytelling technique of real-time updates, familiar from genres like blogging and online diaries. Real-time updates are an important feature of web and transmedia storytelling, as demonstrated in for instance the early creepypasta Ted the Caver (2001) and popular later works like the TV and web drama Skam. Jill Walker argued that the real-time updates, combined with Caroline's questions to the reader and integration of reader responses in the work, caused a sense of ontological fusion between the reader and the fictional world. XPT managing director, Tom Harvey, wrote about this sense of connection between the reader and Caroline as being important: "You can't desert her now."

Many readers thought that the show was real. Jill Walker connects this uncertain status, where readers are unsure whether a digital narrative is real, a hoax or a fiction, to digital narratives like Kaycee Nicole and even to spam emails.

== Reception ==
In addition to being discussed in scholarship on electronic literature and digital narrative and being taught in university courses, Online Caroline received significant media attention at its time of release. It was first released on April 12, 2000, on the homepage of Freeserve, a UK Internet service provider at the time, and so was immediately visible to many people.

The Guardian described it as a soap opera for the internet where readers were invited to be voyeurs: "Meet Caroline. Snoop around her flat, email her, then send her flowers." Another writer for the Guardian wrote that "It's no EastEnders, but should compare favourably with the average email jokes doing the rounds," and pointed out that "There's nothing else quite like it out there at the moment."

== Awards ==
Online Caroline won the 2000 British Academy of Film and Television Arts award for best online drama.
