= The Intimate Adventures of a London Call Girl =

Book by Belle de Jour

- Author: Belle de Jour
- Language: English
- Genre: Nonfiction/Erotica
- Publisher: Orion Publishing
- Publication date: 2005
- Publication place: United Kingdom
- Media type: Print (Hardback & Paperback)
- ISBN: 978-0-7538-1923-4
- OCLC: 60794539
- Followed by: The Further Adventures of a London Call Girl

The Intimate Adventures of a London Call Girl are memoirs of a former London call girl written by Dr. Brooke Magnanti, under the pseudonym Belle de Jour.

From the summer of 2003 to the autumn of 2004 Belle charted her day-to-day adventures on and off the field in a web diary. The blogs were then published into the book, in which Belle elaborates on the diary entries and tells of how she became a Call Girl.

Belle is a natural-born blogger, her style is witty and compact, with the right mixture of intimacy and disassociation...Her entertainment value is huge...because she writes about sex with a mind behind it.

— The Times

== Synopsis ==
The Intimate Adventures of a London Call Girl begins with Belle de Jour introducing herself as a "whore", then further explaining that she does not mean it metaphorically, and that she literally is a "whore".

After the prologue the book begins in a diary format, with Belle explaining the clients she meets and her personal complications that become entwined with her job as a call girl. The average diary entries last little longer than a page and are always titled with the date, which is written in French, for example, the first diary entry reads "Samedi, le 1 Novembre", which translates into Saturday, 1 November. Each chapter is broken apart by the month the diary entries were written in, for example "Novembre" (November).

== People featured in the book ==
- Belle: The writer of The Intimate Adventures of a London Call Girl. The book focuses primarily on Belle's life.
- N: An ex-boyfriend of Belle's and her good friend.
- The manager: Belle's madam, an intelligent woman, fluent in German and Arabic.
- The Boy: Belle's boyfriend, who is aware of her job as a call girl.

== Adaptation ==
An adaption was created for ITV2 in 2007 called Secret Diary of a Call Girl. The show stars Billie Piper as Belle but also shows her private life and her personal struggles; in the adaptation her real name is Hannah Baxter. The show has since been aired in America by Showtime.

=== Differences ===
Some of the characters in Secret Diary of a Call Girl have different personalities from their literary counterparts. N is described as "the hub of all gossip", whereas Ben in Secret Diary of a Call Girl does not seem to share this trait. The manager is described as rather nice, and Belle appears to have a pleasant enough relationship with her, however Stephanie, Belle's madam in Secret Diary, is a cynical woman who often argues with Belle. The Boy appears to have no television equivalent. The closest character to The Boy would be Alex; however the links between the two are somewhat tenuous. The character of Hannah Baxter, who also goes under the pseudonym Belle, remains very close to the original descriptions of Belle de Jour in the books.
