= Brooke Magnanti =

British writer (born 1974/1975)

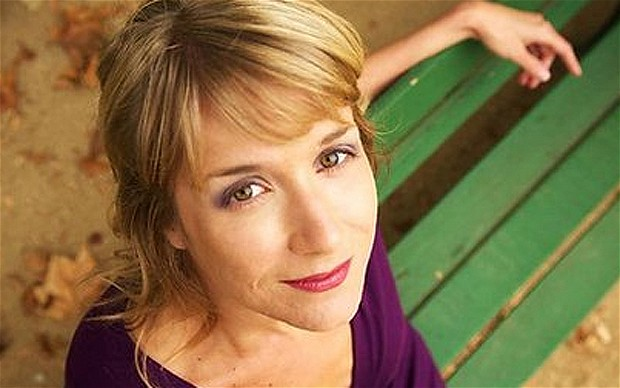
- 2014 publicity image
- Born: Brooke Magnanti; 1974 or 1975 (age 50–51); New Port Richey, Florida, United States
- Education: Florida State University (BS); Sheffield University (PhD)
- Occupations: Research scientist; blogger; former call girl
- Writing career
- Pen name: Belle de Jour, Taro
- Notable work: The Intimate Adventures of a London Call Girl
- Website: belledejour.substack.com

Brooke Magnanti (born 1974 or 1975) is an American-born naturalised British former research scientist, blogger, and writer, who, until her identity was revealed in November 2009, was known by the pen name Belle de Jour. While completing her doctoral studies, between 2003 and 2004, Magnanti supplemented her income by working as a London call girl known by the working name Taro.

Her diary, published as the anonymous blog Belle de Jour: Diary of a London Call Girl, became increasingly popular as speculation surrounded the identity of Belle de Jour. Remaining anonymous, Magnanti went on to have her experiences published as The Intimate Adventures of a London Call Girl in 2005 and The Further Adventures of a London Call Girl in 2006. Her first two books were UK top 10 best-sellers in the non-fiction hardback and non-fiction paperback lists.

In 2007, Belle's blogs and books were adapted into a television programme, Secret Diary of a Call Girl, starring Billie Piper as Hannah Baxter, with the working name of Belle. In November 2009, expecting her real identity was about to come out, Magnanti revealed her real name and occupation as a child health scientist.

She was honoured in BBC's 100 Women in 2013 and 2014.

== Early life ==
Born in New Port Richey, Florida to an Italian-American father and Jewish-American mother, Magnanti grew up in Clearwater, Florida. She graduated from the private Clearwater Central Catholic High School where she was named a National Merit Scholar in 1992.

She entered university at the age of 16, going on to receive a B.S. in 1996 from Florida State University. Relocating to the United Kingdom, Magnanti studied for a master's degree in genetic epidemiology and PhD in informatics, epidemiology, and forensic science from the University of Sheffield in England.

== Identity ==
=== Pseudonym ===
Magnanti's pseudonym was derived from the 1928 novel Belle de Jour by Joseph Kessel and the 1967 film of the same name starring Catherine Deneuve, directed by Luis Buñuel. In the film, "Belle de Jour" is an expression translating literally as "daytime beauty", as Deneuve's character frequented the brothel during the daytime, when her husband was absent from home. The expression is adapted from the French phrase "belle de nuit", which translates as "lady of the night", i.e. a prostitute.

The weblog Belle de Jour: Diary of a London call girl first appeared in October 2003 and won the Guardian newspaper's Best British Weblog 2003, in the second year of the award's existence. There was speculation in the media for several years as to the real identity of the author, whether Belle really was a call girl. Guesses as to who Belle was ranged from Rowan Pelling to Toby Young according to The Telegraph. In 2004 The Sunday Times featured a front-page headline incorrectly identifying Sarah Champion as the author of the blog based on erroneous textual analysis by Donald Foster.

According to The Guardian a fellow British blogger guessed her identity in 2003 but kept it secret. He made a page on his blog containing the googlewhack of Belle de Jour and Brooke Magnanti that allowed him to see if anyone googled the two names. In 2009 he identified IP addresses originating from Associated Newspapers that had accessed the page at which point he contacted Magnanti to alert her. Around the same time tabloid reporters had been escorted from the hospital where she worked for breaking into her office.

=== Revelation of identity ===
On 15 November 2009 The Sunday Times revealed in an interview that the author's real name is Brooke Magnanti; she was 34 years of age at the time. The Guardian's Paul Gallagher described it as the revelation of "one of the best kept literary secrets of the decade". The Daily Telegraph's Stephen Adams said it had been "the new millennium's equivalent of the 1980s' search for the golden hare". Such was the nature of the secret that Magnanti's colleagues did not know until one month before she went public, her publishers had been unaware of her true identity until the previous week and her parents found out on that weekend.

After signing her first book deal and starting writing articles for newspapers, only two other people were aware of her identity, her agent Patrick Walsh and her accountant, who handled the financial transactions via a shell corporation. Magnanti commented that she had thought a former boyfriend was on the verge of outing her, and later reported him to the police for threats and harassment against her and her partner.

Writing on her blog on the day of the revelation, Magnanti stated:

It feels so much better on this side. Not to have to tell lies, hide things from the people I care about. To be able to defend what my experience of sex work is like to all the sceptics and doubters. Anonymity had a purpose then – it will always have a reason to exist, for writers whose work is too damaging or too controversial to put their names on

A spokesperson for the University of Bristol stated, "This aspect of Dr Magnanti's past is not relevant to her current role at the university", while her publisher said, "It's a courageous decision for Belle de Jour to come forward with her true identity and we support her decision to do so".

== Career ==
=== Diary of a London Call Girl ===
He: "So why do you do this?"
Me: "I'm not sure I have an answer to that."
"There must be something that you at least tell yourself."
"Well, perhaps I'm the sort of person apt to do something for no good reason other than I can't think of a reason not to."

— The Intimate Adventures of a London Call Girl

Magnanti worked for 14 months as a £300-an-hour prostitute called Taro for a London escort agency from 2003, after submitting her PhD thesis. She did so due to lack of funds before her viva voce at the University of Sheffield in 2003 and is estimated to have earned more than £100,000 in that period.

She had previously been a science blogger using her real name and started blogging about sex work under a pseudonym. Diary of a London Call Girl was voted Blog of the Year by The Guardian newspaper in 2003. Awards judge Bruce Sterling called it "Archly transgressive, anonymous hooker is definitely manipulating the blog medium, word by word, sentence by sentence far more effectively than any of her competitors ... She is in a league by herself as a blogger." Shortly after receiving the award she signed with literary agency Conville and Walsh which negotiated a publishing deal with Weidenfeld & Nicolson.

Reviews of the books compared her writing to the works of Martin Amis and Nick Hornby, and she frequently quotes from the poems of Philip Larkin. Themes of the blog and books include isolation and personae. "Solitude as much as sex propels these books ... Belle's prickly disbelief in any lasting togetherness picks up an almost existential heft." She writes in Playing the Game "it's not all about the sex – never has been – it's about the heart of darkness."

=== Later writing ===
Magnanti's publisher, Orion Books, printed her first two books as part of its "Non Fiction/Memoir" line. Her third book was classified as fiction and represents a fictional continuation from the first two. Her books have been published in the UK, US, Portugal, Spain, Slovenia, France, Netherlands, Sweden, Germany, Italy, Czech Republic, Romania, Russia, and China.

In 2016 her first thriller The Turning Tide was published in the UK. It attracted positive reviews, with The Guardian listing it among the best recent crime novels and The Times noting "Magnanti's writing is lively and entertaining. When her victims are laid out on that slab, her unspeakably detailed descriptions are good enough to put the wind up Patricia Cornwell."

From November 2005 until May 2006, Magnanti contributed a regular column in The Sunday Telegraph. Since her identity had been revealed she has written about UK libel laws and their effect on science for The Guardian's website Comment Is Free.

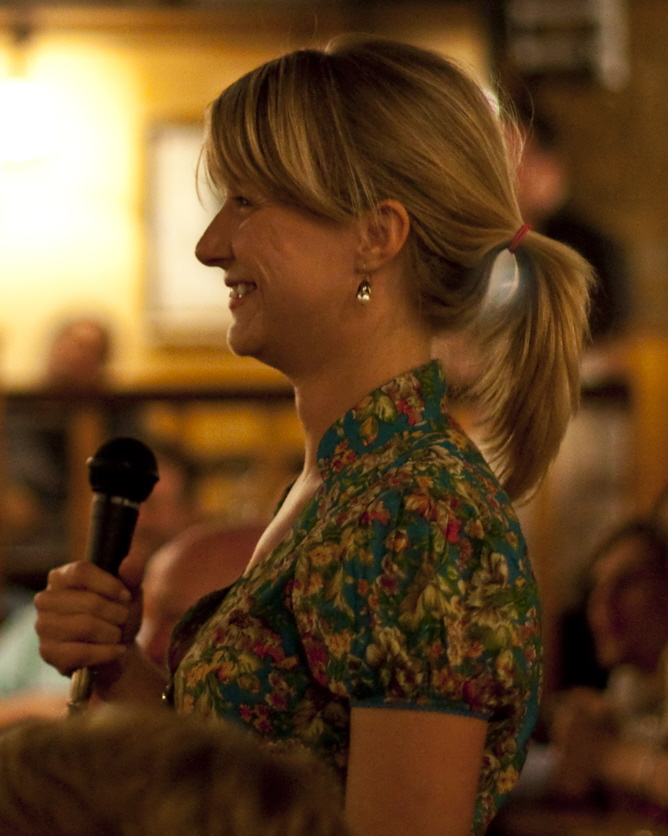
Magnanti speaking in 2010

On 25 February 2010 Magnanti appeared on the BBC political affairs programme This Week to discuss the subject of sex education. She is also an occasional guest on The Book Show broadcast on Sky Arts and has spoken at a number of venues including The Sunday Times Oxford Literary Festival in conversation with India Knight. She has also spoken on internet and forensic identity as part of the Bristol Festival of Ideas and was a guest on the Stephen Fry 2011 series Fry's Planet Word.

In 2012 Magnanti was selected as ambassador for the Inverness Whisky Festival and was ambassador for the festival's gin section in 2015. Magnanti, along with Tobias Hill, acted as a judge for Fleeting Magazine's 2012 Six-Word Short Story Prize. She was interviewed on Hardtalk on the BBC in October.

Since 2012 she has been contributing blogger to The Daily Telegraph.

=== Scientist ===
Magnanti's PhD thesis, awarded from the University of Sheffield Department of Forensic Pathology, was entitled Macrobioinformatics: the application of informatics methods to records of human remains. It was submitted in September 2003 and the degree was awarded in 2004. After moving to London and while blogging as Belle de Jour she also worked as a computer programmer in cheminformatics at InforSense. She blogged about this career at Cosmas.

Magnanti went on to work as a biostatistician in the Newcastle University Paediatric and Lifecourse Epidemiology Research Group (PLERG), researching a possible link between the occurrence of thyroid cancer in under-25s in NE England and radioiodine fallout exposure from Chernobyl in Ukraine.

After her pseudonymous publishing career Magnanti was identified to be working as a research associate in developmental neurotoxicology and cancer epidemiology at the Bristol Initiative for Research of Child Health (BIRCH) at the University of Bristol. Specifically she was part of the EU-funded Henvinet consortium, researching the policies for assessing the risks of developmental neuropathology from exposure to organophosphates. She collaborated on several EU project policy documents regarding human developmental risks of environmental exposure to chlorpyrifos, phthalates, and DecaBDE and HBCD.

=== Activism ===
In early 2012, Magnanti published a non-fiction popular science book under her real name entitled The Sex Myth. It covered topics in sexuality studies and sociological research in the effects of adult entertainment and sex work.

Reviewing for The Observer Catherine Hakim wrote "Magnanti offers a pretty sharp analysis of sexual politics: who fabricates the myths and why, the role of both rightwing and leftwing media in building up moral panics, the vast sums obtained by the pressure groups that profit from them, and, more recently, too, by the pharmaceutical companies that plan to profit from newly invented sexual diseases." It drew a less favourable review from Julie Bindel, who writes of Magnanti's book, "I disagree with just about everything she has to say".

In 2011 Brooke Magnanti published a statistical re-analysis criticising the Lilith Report on Lap Dancing and Striptease in the Borough of Camden, a study which had claimed that sexual crimes increased after the opening of lap dancing venues in the area; the analysis showed this was not the case. The independent London newspaper the Camden New Journal highlighted Magnanti's criticism of the Lilith findings.

In May 2016 Magnanti, alongside Paris Lees, was called to give evidence about sex work conditions in the UK to the Home Affairs Committee investigating prostitution laws in Britain. The resulting recommendations by the committee headed by Keith Vaz, released in July 2016, implemented the pair's suggestions to eliminate criminal records of those arrested for prostitution-related crimes. Sex worker nonprofits called the apparent U-turn decision "a stunning victory for sex workers and our demands for decriminalisation" and "a giant step forward for sex workers' rights in the UK."

=== Secret Diary of a Call Girl ===
A television series loosely based on the first book was in development with Channel 4 in the UK, but eventually aired on ITV2 as Secret Diary of a Call Girl. The first series aired from 27 September 2007 to 15 November 2007 starring Billie Piper as Hannah Baxter (Belle). Magnanti met Piper in the course of preparing for the role but maintained her anonymity. A half-hour TV programme covering a meeting and conversation between the two was broadcast on ITV2 on 25 January 2010. The second series commenced broadcasting in the UK on ITV2 on 11 September 2008.

The third series began broadcasting in the UK in January 2010. The fourth and final series started broadcasting in the UK on ITV2 in February 2011.

== Personal life ==
Magnanti was married and used to live in Lochaber in the Scottish Highlands. She became a British citizen in 2013, and moved back to the United States in 2016.

=== Libel case ===
In June 2011 an ex-boyfriend issued a libel writ against The Sunday Times for a claim of defamation caused by his mention in the paper. The claim, filed by Flight Lieutenant Owen Morris of RAF Lossiemouth, claimed that following her outing, he was identified as her former boyfriend and therefore mentions of his harassment in the articles had been damaging even though they did not mention him by name. The Sunday Times printed an apology in February 2012, followed by The Week which agreed to pay damages.

== Bibliography ==
=== Writing as Belle de Jour ===
- Belle de Jour (2010). Belle's Best Bits. Phoenix. ISBN 978-0-7538-2794-9.
- Belle de Jour (2009). Belle De Jour's Guide to Men. Orion. ISBN 978-1-4091-1384-3.
- Belle de Jour (2009). Playing the Game. Orion. ISBN 978-0-7538-2561-7.
- Belle de Jour (2006). The Further Adventures of a London Call Girl. Weidenfeld & Nicolson. ISBN 978-0-297-85128-8.
- Belle de Jour (2006). Belle De Jour: Diary of an Unlikely Call Girl. Grand Central Publishing. ISBN 978-0-446-57725-0.
- Belle de Jour (2005). The Intimate Adventures of a London Call Girl. Weidenfeld & Nicolson. ISBN 978-0-297-84782-3.

=== Writing as Brooke Magnanti ===
- Brooke Magnanti (2012). The Sex Myth. Weidenfeld & Nicolson. ISBN 978-0-297-86639-8.
- Brooke Magnanti (2016). The Turning Tide. Orion Publishing Co. ISBN 978-1-4091-0085-0.
- Brooke Magnanti (2017). "Formerly Known As Belle de Jour": Selected Writings 2010–2017. Independently Published. ISBN 978-1-5207-6321-7.
- Brooke Magnanti (2017). You Don't Know Me. Orion Publishing Co. ISBN 978-1-4091-0089-8.
- Brooke Magnanti (2017). Sex, Lies and Statistics. Independently Published. ISBN 978-1-5495-0314-6.

=== Selected scientific works ===
- Saunders, Margaret; Magnanti, Brooke; Carreira, Sara; Yang, Aileen; Calamandrei, Gemma; Koppe, Janna; von Krauss, Martin; Keune, Hans; Bartonova, Alena; Keune, Hans; Bartonova, Alena (2012). "Chlorpyrifos and neurodevelopmental effects: a literature review and expert elicitation on research and policy". Environmental Health. 11 (S5): S5. Bibcode:2012EnvHe..11S...5S. doi:10.1186/1476-069X-11-S1-S5. PMC 3388448. PMID 22759505.
- Magnanti, Brooke; Dorak, M. Tevfik; Parker, Louise; Craft, Alan W.; James, Peter W.; McNally, Richard J. Q. (2008). "Sex-specific incidence and temporal trends in solid tumours in young people from Northern England, 1968–2005". BMC Cancer. 8 (89): 89. doi:10.1186/1471-2407-8-89. PMC 2358914. PMID 18387183.
- Magnanti, Brooke; Dorak, M. Tevfik; Parker, Louise; Craft, Alan W.; James, Peter W.; McNally, Richard J. Q. (2008). "Sex-specific patterns and trends in the incidence of hematologic malignancies in 0–24 year olds from Northern England, 1968–2005". haematologica. 93 (9): 1438–1440. doi:10.3324/haematol.12919. PMID 18603551. S2CID 207687355.
- Magnanti, Brooke; Dorak, M. Tevfik; Parker, Louise; Craft, Alan W.; James, Peter W.; McNally, Richard J. Q. (2008). "Geographical analysis of thyroid cancer in young people from northern England: Evidence for a sustained excess in females in Cumbria". European Journal of Cancer. 45 (9): 1624–1629. doi:10.1016/j.ejca.2008.12.024. PMID 19179067.
- Magnanti, Brooke; Nicholls, A.; Sayle, R. (2003). David Arnold and Alan Chalmers and Franco Niccolucci (ed.). Multi-Platform Skeletal Visualisation and Reproduction in Stereolithography. 4th International Symposium on Virtual Reality, Archaeology and Intelligent Cultural Heritage. Brighton, United Kingdom: Eurographics Association. pp. 89–92. doi:10.2312/VAST/VAST03/089-092.
