= Hannah Baxter =

Fictional character from Secret Diary of a Call Girl

- Secret Diary of a Call Girl character
- First appearance: Episode 1.1
- Last appearance: Episode 4.8
- Created by: Lucy Prebble; Brooke Magnanti (source material)
- Portrayed by: Billie Piper

In-universe information
- Aliases: Belle de Jour; Olga
- Gender: Female
- Occupation: Independent escort, writer
- Family: Jackie Baxter (sister)

Hannah Baxter is the lead semi-fictional character and protagonist of the British ITV2 television series Secret Diary of a Call Girl. Hannah secretly has a double life as a high-class call girl as her alter ego Belle.

The character Hannah Baxter is based on the real life published memoirs of former London call girl Dr. Brooke Magnanti, who is better known by her pseudonym, "Belle de Jour". The character Hannah is portrayed by Billie Piper.

== Character overview ==
=== Career ===
Hannah is a university graduate with a degree in English literature who chooses a career as a call girl for the sake of the money. She reveals that she makes a yearly turnover of £105,000 (though, she claims, it takes £20,000 "to be Belle"). She further claims her career is ideal since she is "fundamentally lazy", in control, and also because she genuinely enjoys the pleasures of sex. Open minded and truly a professional when it comes to her role as a high-end prostitute, Hannah has gone as far as considering a breast augmentation to better appeal to clients, and will likely attempt a variety of fetishes and bedroom scenarios with them. Furthermore, Hannah wants to pride herself on her skills in the bedroom and her ability to size up her male clients, such as predicting what kind of lifestyles they lead, based on what their sexual interests are and the price, ratings, and styles of the hotels they pay for on "out calls".

Hannah is typically capable of separating her true self while donning her alter ego while working; however, there have been moments in the series where she's found it difficult, such as when she lets her guard down and reveals to a client in the first episode her real name, has intruding thoughts of family and relationships at times with clients, or when she develops a friendly relationship with a male client only to feel personally betrayed when he chooses to hire a different call girl. Despite the disappointments and emotional frustration that sometimes comes with Hannah's work, she is mostly happy with her work, and at several points throughout the series she gives up on attempts to get a "normal job".

=== Personality and character traits ===
Hannah is portrayed as a very wise, confident, intelligent, and at times, an outspoken or cheeky character. It is demonstrated throughout the series that Hannah is very meticulous when it comes to organizing her private life with her work, for which she keeps the two completely separate, and will go great measures to keep her occupation concealed from family and friends, which often means she relies on lying, such as telling others that her occupation is a night-time legal secretary for an international law firm. Despite Hannah's discretion and lengthy attempts to keep both worlds apart, the issue of secretly juggling both identities frequently reoccurs in the series, often resulting in negative inner turmoil for her and feelings of loneliness.

Often Hannah deals with how much balance is placed on either her personal life or work, for which she is, usually, focused on work – leaving her personal life sometimes neglected, such as when she misses the birth of her sister's child. She claims that romantic relationships are typically avoided, since her profession merely complicates them, which is demonstrated in the second series where she develops a relationship with a man that ends badly. On the show there are visual differences between her and her alter ego Belle, for which she maintains a girl next door image in her real life, and an elaborate sultry one as Belle, which usually includes provocative clothing and impeccable makeup application.

== Character history ==
=== Series 1 ===
The first season serves as an introduction to Hannah's double life as Belle, her variety of clients, rules, and methods of juggling her separate worlds while trying to please her clients, and her sometimes unsuccessful attempts to remain connected to her best friend, Ben (Iddo Goldberg), and family, who are not aware of what she does for a living.

Eventually, after a couple of incidents where Hannah becomes troubled with work and suffers the burden of secrecy by having no one to talk to, she reveals to Ben what she does. Although Ben is disappointed and angered that she has been deceiving him, he accepts Hannah's choices, counsels her on matters of work, and even joins a foursome with her and a married couple who are her clients. It becomes apparent that Hannah and Ben – who used to be in a romantic relationship two years ago – still may have more than simply platonic affection for one another. Towards the end of the season Hannah is offered a role as a courtesan, which she is initially enthusiastic about, but eventually walks away from – despite the luxury – because of the lack of excitement. Instead of returning to her agent Stephanie (Cherie Lunghi), Hannah chooses to go independent, with the support from Ben.

=== Series 2 ===
For the second season Hannah deals with the challenge of mentoring young escort wannabe Bambi (Ashley Madekwe), while entering against her better judgment a blossoming romance with a man called Alex (Callum Blue), who is unaware what Hannah does for a living. Alex, a doctor specializing in anesthesiology, though he is still in training as a registrar, met Hannah at a hotel bar after his interview for a registrar position, having his hotel room paid for by the NHS. Hannah, mistakes him for her scheduled client, also named Alex, an MP from the Liberal Democrats. Though Hannah is happy with Alex, and the pair care deeply for one another, their relationship is shortly re-established after Alex discovers Hannah's secret life, having walked in on her while she was in the midst of sex with a young man using a wheelchair (David Proud). Hannah and Alex get back together when she retires as an escort and is hired as a temp, assigned to MH Credit. However, when given the ultimatum between him and her work, Hannah eventually is caught returning to sex for money when Alex hires her through Hannah's former agency as a test of character, despite earlier promises to him that she would abandon her life as Belle. With the support of Ben and Bambi, Hannah writes and publishes a memoir of her adventures and life as London call girl at the end of the series, where she – under disguise – remarks to an interviewer on television that she had once been in love, referring to Alex.

=== Series 3 ===
In the third season, Hannah prepares to publish her next novel, for which her first from the previous season was a success. Her publisher, Duncan, encourages her to choose more outlandish clients, with even more odd sexual fetishes, to make an even better story for her next book. Meanwhile, Hannah's sister Jackie decides to crash at Hannah's flat after a fall out with her husband, potentially interfering with Hannah's life as Belle. As the third season progresses, she becomes involved with her publisher. She tries to deny these feelings and a longing for a relationship, but after he claims to accepts her life as Belle, she decides to give it a go.

During Bambi's wedding, Bambi reveals that she has slept with Duncan who called himself Richard. Hannah confronts Duncan who says that as she sleeps with other men, he can sleep with other women and they never said they were exclusive. Hannah angrily replies that it's her job, it's different, and he said he accepted that. Hannah then breaks up with him. As a form of revenge, she writes the last chapter of her book about him, a man addicted to using escorts, and sends it to everyone at the publishing house. She then accepts an offer from Stephanie to spend two weeks in Mauritius with a client. As she is getting on the plane, Ben calls her and says he wants them to be a couple, as he fully accepts her for what she is and always has. He tells her to go off, see the world, have adventures, but come back to him.

=== Series 4 ===
When she returns from Mauritius, Hannah has purchased her own townhouse. However, her happiness is married when Stephanie is imprisoned, resulting in her daughter Poppy having to stay with Hannah for an indefinite amount of time. Hannah also, has to take on Stephanie's role as madam of the business whilst she is away, and continues to be an escort, whilst being in a relationship with Ben. A client, Harry, takes a strong liking to Belle. He tells her frequently that she should leave Ben for him. Ben eventually admits that Belle's career is damaging their relationship and he gives her an ultimatum. In the series finale she realizes she cannot leave her job and that Ben deserves a more genuine relationship. Belle breaks up with Ben and walks off into the night, avoiding Harry as she goes and deciding to move on with her life.
