= Secret Diary of a Call Girl =

British television drama, 2007–2011

- Genre: Drama; Sex comedy
- Created by: Lucy Prebble
- Based on: The Intimate Adventures of a London Call Girl by Belle de Jour
- Directed by: Yann Demange; Susan Tully; Peter Lydon; Fraser MacDonald; China Moo-Young; Alex García López; Wayne Yip; Billie Piper
- Starring: Billie Piper; Iddo Goldberg; Cherie Lunghi; Ashley Madekwe; Callum Blue; James D'Arcy; Lily James; Gemma Chan; Paul Nicholls
- Opening theme: "You Know I'm No Good" (instrumental)
- Country of origin: United Kingdom
- Original language: English
- No. of series: 4
- No. of episodes: 32 (list of episodes)

Production
- Executive producers: Greg Brenman; Avril MacRory; Michael Foster; Billie Piper
- Producers: Jacquie Glanville; Elinor Day
- Cinematography: Gavin Struthers (series 2)
- Running time: 22 minutes
- Production companies: Tiger Aspect Productions; Silver Apples Media; Artist Rights Group; Miracle Pictures

Original release
- Network: ITV2; Showtime
- Release: 27 September 2007 – 22 March 2011

Secret Diary of a Call Girl is a British drama television series that aired from 27 September 2007 to 22 March 2011 on ITV2, based on the blog and books by the pseudonymous Belle de Jour. It stars Billie Piper as Belle, a high-end call girl in London.

The series was written by Lucy Prebble, who is also the author of the plays The Sugar Syndrome and Enron. The series has been compared to Sex and the City by many critics, mainly due to its humorous approach to sex.

== Plot ==
The series, set in London, revolves around the life of Hannah Baxter (Billie Piper), a young woman who lives a secret life as a call girl, under the pseudonym Belle. The series focuses on her professional and private lives and on complications that arise when these collide. She receives help and advice from her best friend Ben (Iddo Goldberg). In the second series premiere, a new call girl is introduced: Bambi (Ashley Madekwe). Hannah becomes close friends with Bambi and often advises her.

Hannah, as the main character, also narrates the series, sometimes through voiceovers but more frequently by breaking the fourth wall. During the first series, the episodes are held together by a light story arc. Series 2 and 3 rely heavily on story arcs, mainly in the form of Hannah's romances, with Alex and Duncan respectively.

== Episodes ==
Series	Episodes	Originally released		Ave. viewers (millions)
Series	Episodes	First released	Last released	Ave. viewers (millions)
1	8	27 September 2007	15 November 2007	1.24
2	8	11 September 2008	23 October 2008	0.98
Special		25 January 2010		0.34
3	8	28 January 2010	11 March 2010	0.83
4	8	1 February 2011	22 March 2011	0.65

== Cast and characters ==
=== Main ===
- Billie Piper as Hannah "Belle" Baxter: a young, attractive university graduate who, under the pseudonym Belle, has made a name for herself as a successful high-end escort. Hannah is secretive about her job to her family and friends, pretending that she is a night-time legal secretary, although she thoroughly enjoys her work.
- Iddo Goldberg as Ben: Hannah's best friend and former boyfriend from their university days. Ben is the manager of a London bar and is at first unaware of Hannah's real job. Ben is in a relationship with his girlfriend Vanessa who does not care for Hannah. Over the course of the series Hannah and Ben's relationship develops.
- Cherie Lunghi as Stephanie Charlton: Hannah's agent in the first series. Stephanie runs a successful escorting agency called Discreet Elite. She is a shrewd businesswoman who can sometimes come across as cold-hearted and unfeeling.
- Ashley Madekwe as Gloria "Bambi" White (series 2–3): a naive young escort who is mentored by Belle and later becomes a close friend. Bambi has had a hard life and mainly wants to escort for the money. She marries Byron, her former client, in the series 3 finale.
- Callum Blue as Alex McLoud (series 2): a doctor whom Belle mistakes for a client. Alex is immediately attracted to Belle but does not realise that she is a prostitute. They are in a relationship, even after he finds out that she is an escort, but eventually break up.
- James D'Arcy as Duncan Atwood (series 3): Hannah's publisher after she has become a best-selling author. Hannah soon develops feelings for Duncan and starts a relationship with him. After it is revealed that he sleeps with escorts frequently, including Bambi, Hannah breaks up with him.
- Lily James as Poppy (series 4): Stephanie's daughter who does not know what her mother does professionally.
- Gemma Chan as Charlotte (series 4): one of the girls working for Discreet Elite. Charlotte is domineering, unfriendly, and used to getting what she wants.
- Paul Nicholls as Det. Sgt. Harry Keegan (series 4): a client of Discreet Elite, who has an exceptional interest in Belle.

=== Recurring ===
- Toyah Willcox and Stuart Organ as Gail and Niall Baxter (series 1–2): Hannah's parents who are unaware of their daughter's profession.
- Joanna Bobin as Jackie: Hannah's sister who is unaware of her sister's profession. Jackie is married and has an infant son. When she learns that her husband was unfaithful, she temporarily moves in with Hannah and has an affair with Ben.
- Ace Bhatti as Ashok (series 1–2): One of Belle's favourite regular clients until he chooses to see another escort.
- David Dawson as Byron Seeborm (series 3): a young, rebellious aristocrat who hires Bambi as an escort and then falls in love with and marries her.

== Background and production ==
The rights to the blog were bought by Silverapples Media (Avril MacRory and Paul Duane), who co-produced the series with Tiger Aspect Productions. The series was initially developed with Channel 4 and when Channel 4 passed on the project, ITV took over. The series aired in a late-night 10pm slot, as part of ITV2's "XXL Thursday" programming block.

The theme song is an excerpt of "You Know I'm No Good" by Amy Winehouse. The song runs whilst the intertitle plays, showing Belle applying make-up and getting dressed, interspersed with shots of urban London.

Both series 1 and 2 consisted of eight episodes: the series was commissioned for a third series, even before the second series was aired. Actress Billie Piper herself commented on the difficulties of Hannah's wardrobe as Belle since Piper was pregnant during the filming of series two. Piper described Hannah's usual attire worn, explaining, "I wear tight clothes in this show, so it's obvious [her pregnancy]." The crew decided to shoot using ulterior angles, to disguise her baby bump, with Piper noting, "We were shooting around my torso, basically." For the nude scenes, body doubles were employed. In addition, Hannah's wardrobe changed frequently, including the use of accessories such as shawls being worn, or on occasion, an entirely loose-fitting outfit.

The filming of series 3 began at the start of 2009, once Piper had recovered after the birth of her son in October 2008. Piper also stated she would be taking on the role of executive producer of the upcoming series as well. Ahead of the series 3 premiere ITV2 aired a one-off interview between Piper and Brooke Magnanti, who had written under the Belle de Jour pseudonym, entitled, Billie and the Real Belle Bare All.

Piper stated that the fourth series was to be the final. There were brief rumors during the filming of series 4 of a movie adaptation.

== Broadcast ==
List of broadcasters

Country	Channel
United Kingdom	ITV2
Australia	Nine Network; GEM; Arena
Argentina	I-Sat
Belgium	Vitaya
Canada	Showcase; The Movie Network
Czech Republic	Prima Cool
Denmark	Kanal 4
Spain	Fox
Finland	Nelonen
France	Téva; M6
Greece	Alpha TV
Germany	Passion
Hungary	RTL Klub
Iceland	Skjár einn

Country	Channel
Israel	Yes Stars Drama
Italy	Fox Life
Netherlands	RTL 5
New Zealand	Prime; UKTV
Norway	TVNorge
Peru	I-Sat
Poland	Fox Life
Portugal	FX
Russia	Muz-TV
Slovenia	TV3
South Africa	MNET Series
Sweden	Kanal 5
Turkey	Fox Life
United States	Showtime
Latin America	VH1 I-Sat
Middle East	Showtime Arabia

US promotional poster (Series 1)

The series was first broadcast on 27 September 2007 on ITV2 in the United Kingdom. It was watched by 1.9 million, a record (which has since been beaten by Bionic Woman) for ITV2.

In Canada, the first series began on Showcase on 22 November 2007. The second series debuted on The Movie Network on 19 January 2009.

In the United States, Showtime aired the first series of eight half-hour episodes beginning in June 2008, with a commitment for an additional 12 episodes. Robert Greenblatt, Showtime's president of entertainment, initially considered buying format rights and recasting it with American actors, but he ultimately decided that the original was "fantastic"; Greenblatt also noted that "it's very hard to find American actresses who are comfortable doing nudity." The second series aired on 18 January 2009. On 6 November 2009, Showtime announced that the show's third series would return on 25 January 2010 at 10:00pm. Showtime scheduled the fourth series to premiere 7 April 2011, at 10:30pm.

== Home media ==
The first series was released on 7 January 2008 on Region 2 DVD. Series 2 was released in the United Kingdom on 2 March 2009 and like the first series classified 18. On the same day, a four disc box set edition consisting of both series 1 and 2 was released. On both sets, much of the popular music was replaced due to high licensing costs.

The entire series is also available to download on iTunes and to stream on Netflix UK, Lovefilm UK and Tubi.

In the United States the Region 1 version of series 1 was released on 6 January 2009. Series 2 was released soon afterwards, in June. Again, much of the music was replaced due to high licensing costs.

The television series is rated R18 in New Zealand as it contains sex scenes and offensive language.

== Reception ==
=== Critical response ===
The show [...] uses London in somewhat the same way Sex and the City used New York – we see a lot of bright lights, fancy restaurants, and expensive apartments – though there is a sadder, more wistful quality to the photography here, as if Belle were living in a kind of London fog, which, of course, she is.

— The New Yorker, noting the similarities between the two shows.

The series was mainly well received by critics, with Tim Goodman of The San Francisco Chronicle saying, "there's surprise at how much you've underestimated its quality." It was graded A− by Entertainment Weekly, which said, "you will find a rather fascinating drama." Entertainment Weekly also commented on Billie Piper's portrayal of Belle, saying, "Piper is extraordinary, intermittently talking right to the camera in a straightforward, conspiratorial manner, the way a prostitute who's really good at her job would talk to a client." It was less well received, however, by The New York Times, which said, "Secret Diary has amusing touches, but not enough to sustain an entire series."

Whilst reviewing Series 3 of Secret Diary of a Call Girl, Gerard O'Donovan of The Telegraph opined that the show focuses too much on Piper's character, saying "All the characters, apart from Belle (Piper), are about as two-dimensional as cardboard cut-outs – and no more engaging."

=== Criticism ===
The series was also accused of glamorizing and being a misrepresentation of prostitution.

Piper hit back at the claims saying, "We've only been exposed to the drug-fuelled, sex traffic side – but the fact is, there are middle-class, cultured, well-read women who take part in this job."

=== Ratings ===
The first series averaged 1,242,125 viewers in the UK. The following weekly viewership statistics are from the Broadcasters' Audience Research Board.

Series	Episodes	Originally released		Ave. viewers (millions)
Series	Episodes	First released	Last released	Ave. viewers (millions)
1	8	27 September 2007	15 November 2007	1.24
2	8	11 September 2008	23 October 2008	0.98
Special		25 January 2010		0.34
3	8	28 January 2010	11 March 2010	0.83
4	8	1 February 2011	22 March 2011	0.65

The series premiered in the United States on Showtime to the highest ratings the cable channel had seen in four years for a television premiere. The series debut reached almost one million viewers, its closest rival, Dexter, premiered to 604,000. The showing held on to an impressive 70% of its lead-in audience that tuned in for the fourth-series premiere of Weeds.

== International versions ==
- On 8 April 2012, the Chilean network TVN premiered a remake called Diario secreto de una profesional (The secret diary of a professional). The show stars Fernanda Urrejola as Javiera García, who works as call girl Ángela.
- A Dutch remake, called Dagboek van een Callgirl (Diary of a Call Girl), premiered on 26 March 2015 on Net5. Sanne Langelaar portrays Anne, who secretly works as call girl Jolie. The story's setting is changed to Amsterdam. The first season adapts several scripts from the first and second series of the UK series. It was not renewed for a second season (which was planned to adapt the third and final series of the British show).
