= Billie Piper discography =

Cataloguing of published recordings by Billie Piper

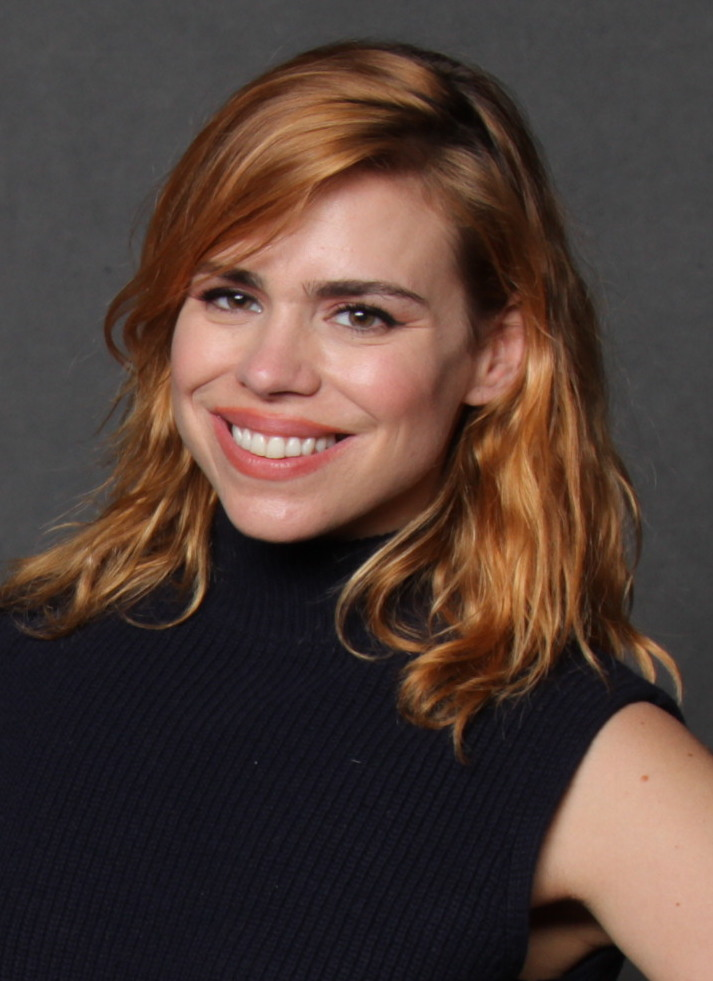
- Piper at Florida Supercon in 2016
- Studio albums: 2
- Compilation albums: 2
- Singles: 9
- Music videos: 8

The discography of Billie Piper, a British pop music singer, consists of two studio albums, two compilation albums, and nine singles. Piper debuted in the early 1990s as an actress, appearing in several television advertisements. She signed a recording contract with Innocent Records, a subsidiary of Virgin Records, in 1998.

Piper's debut studio album, Honey to the B, was released in October 1998. The album, which contained upbeat dance-pop songs, reached number three in New Zealand and number 14 in the United Kingdom. It was certified double platinum by Recorded Music NZ (RMNZ) and platinum by the British Phonographic Industry (BPI). Her debut single "Because We Want To" reached number one on the UK Singles Chart and Piper became the youngest British artist to release a number one single in over forty years.

Piper's second album, Walk of Life, was released in July 2000. It peaked at number 14 in the UK and number 17 in New Zealand. The album was certified silver by the BPI. Two singles from the album, "Day & Night" and "Something Deep Inside", reached the top five in the UK. By summer 2001, Piper retired from the recording industry, choosing instead to focus on acting.

== Albums ==
=== Studio albums ===
List of studio albums, with selected chart positions and certifications
Title	Album details	Peak chart positions							Certifications
Title	Album details	UK	AUS	IRE	JPN	NZ	SWE	US H/S	Certifications
Honey to the B	Released: 19 October 1998 (UK); Formats: CD, CS, MiniDisc, DD; Labels: Innocent, Virgin (CDSIN1)	14	31	—	46	3	56	17	BPI: Platinum; RMNZ: 2× Platinum
Walk of Life	Released: 18 October 2000 (UK); Formats: CD, CS, DD; Labels: Innocent, Virgin (CDSINX3)	14	23	65	—	17	—	—	BPI: Silver
"—" denotes a recording that did not chart or was not released in that territory.

=== Compilation albums ===
List of compilations albums, with selected chart positions
Title	Album details	Peak chart positions
Title	Album details	UK Budget
The Best of Billie	Released: 8 August 2005 (UK); Formats: CD, DD; Label: EMI (3119282)	41
The Singles Collection	Released: 10 September 2012 (UK); Formats: CD, DD; Label: Music Club Deluxe (MCDLX170)	—
"—" denotes a recording that did not chart or was not released in that territory.

== Extended plays ==
List of extended plays
Title	Extended play details
5 Bites	Released: 25 May 2012 (UK); Label: Virgin; Format: DD

== Singles ==
List of singles, with selected chart positions and certifications, showing year released and album name
Title	Year	Peak chart positions										Certifications	Album
Title	Year	UK	AUS	BEL (FL)	CAN	IRE	NL	NZ	SWE	SWI	US Dance	Certifications	Album
"Because We Want To"	1998	1	19	55	14	9	—	9	8	—	—	BPI: Silver	Honey to the B
"Girlfriend"	1998	1	35	—	—	12	—	2	22	—	—	BPI: Silver; RMNZ: Gold	Honey to the B
"She Wants You"	1998	3	83	—	—	21	—	4	—	—	9	BPI: Silver	Honey to the B
"Last Christmas"	1998	—	—	—	—	—	—	—	47	—	—		—N/a
"Honey to the Bee"	1999	3	6	—	—	25	—	5	—	—	—	BPI: Silver; ARIA: Platinum	Honey to the B
"Thank ABBA for the Music" (with Steps, Tina Cousins, Cleopatra and B*Witched)	1999	4	9	23	—	5	14	6	8	—	—	BPI: Silver; ARIA: Platinum	ABBAmania
"Day & Night"	2000	1	8	38	—	13	47	6	52	62	—	BPI: Silver; ARIA: Platinum; RMNZ: Gold	Walk of Life
"Something Deep Inside"	2000	4	20	59	—	33	—	18	—	97	—		Walk of Life
"Walk of Life"	2000	25	—	—	—	—	—	—	—	66	—		Walk of Life
"—" denotes a recording that did not chart or was not released in that territory.

== Music videos ==
List of music videos, showing year released and director
Title	Year	Director(s)
"Because We Want To"	1998	Phil Griffin
"Girlfriend"	1998	Phil Griffin
"She Wants You" (version one)	1998	Phil Griffin
"She Wants You" (version two)	1998	Phil Griffin
"Honey to the Bee"	1999	Katie Bell
"Day and Night"	2000	Cameron Casey
"Something Deep Inside"	2000	Cameron Casey
"Walk of Life"	2000	Jamie Morgan
