= The Best of Billie =

Greatest hits album by Billie Piper
- Released: 8 August 2005
- Recorded: 1998–2000
- Genre: Pop
- Length: 59:51
- Label: EMI Gold
- Producer: Various

Billie Piper chronology
Walk of Life (2000)	The Best of Billie (2005)

The Best of Billie (originally known as The Very Best of Billie Piper) is a compilation album by British pop singer Billie Piper. It was released by EMI Gold on 8 August 2005 following Piper's high-profile return to the public eye in Doctor Who. The compilation contained Piper's single releases as well as B-sides. The compilation was released as a budget album in the United Kingdom, and therefore was ineligible to chart. However it did manage to peak at Number 41 on the UK Budget Albums Chart.

== Track listing ==
1. "Because We Want To" - 3:51
2. "Girlfriend" - 3:53
3. "She Wants You" - 3:41
4. "Party on the Phone" - 4:12
5. "The Tide Is High" - 3:08
6. "Honey to the Bee" - 5:05
7. "I Dream" - 5:34
8. "Day & Night" - 3:18
9. "Bring It On" - 3:31
10. "Promises" - 3:32
11. "Something Deep Inside" - 3:23
12. "First Love" - 3:41
13. "G.H.E.T.T.O.U.T." - 4:21
14. "Caress the Gold" - 4:58
15. "Walk of Life" - 3:50

Tracks 1–4, 6 and 7 taken from the album Honey to the B.
Tracks 5, 8–11, and 15 taken from the album Walk of Life.
Track 12 taken from the "Something Deep Inside" single and Walk of Life (Japan Edition).
Track 13 taken from the "Because We Want To" single.
Track 14 taken from the "Walk of Life" single.
