= List of awards and nominations received by Billie Piper =

List of Billie Piper awards
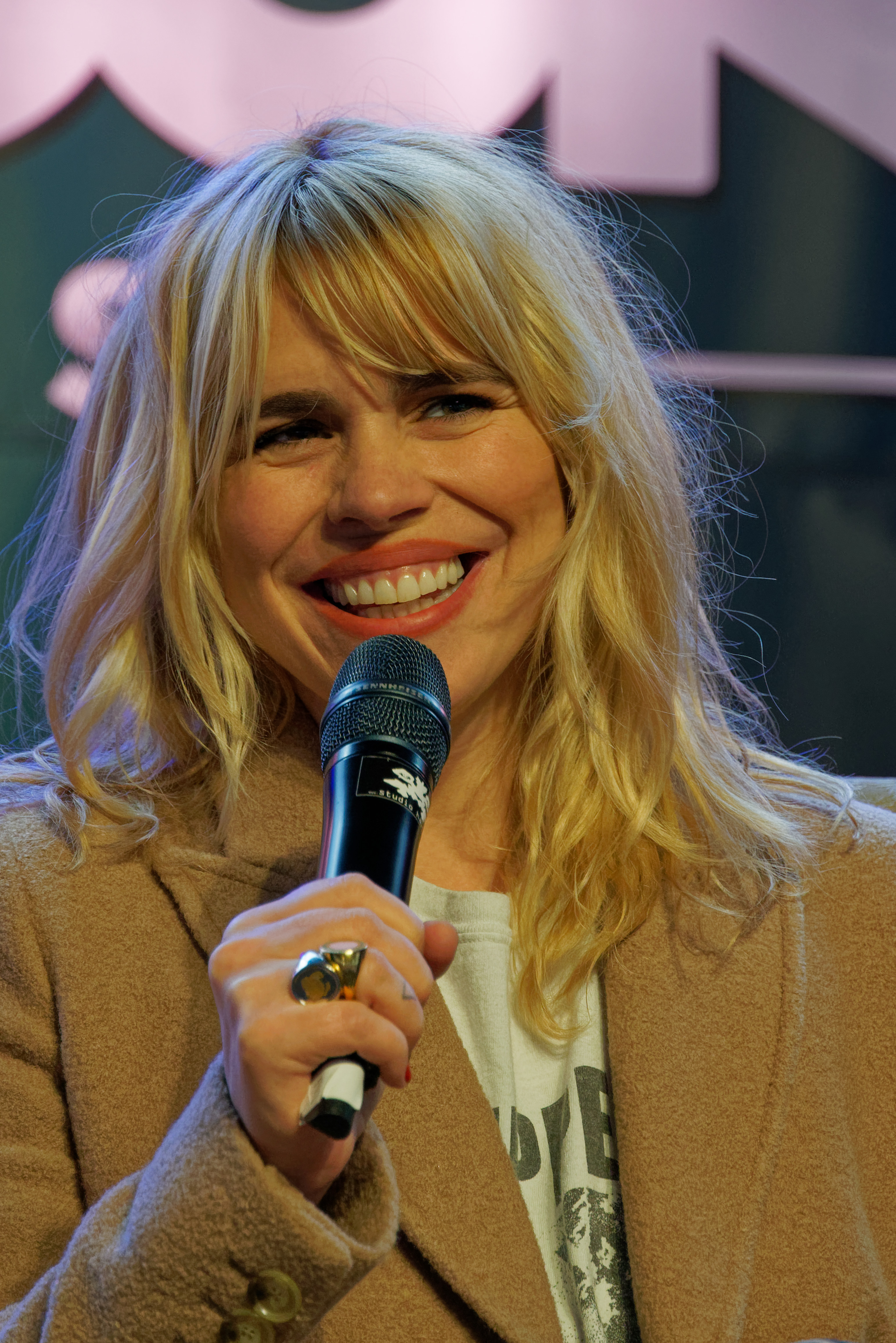
- Piper in 2019
| Award | Wins | Nominations |
| Laurence Olivier Awards | 1 | 2 |
| BAFTA Awards | 0 | 4 |
| Evening Standard Theatre Awards | 1 | 4 |
| Critics' Circle Theatre Awards | 1 | 1 |
| WhatsOnStage Awards | 2 | 3 |
| National Television Awards | 2 | 2 |

The following is a list of awards and nominations received by English actress Billie Piper.

In total, she has won and been nominated for more than 70 recognised awards. Piper is the only female actor to have won all six of the currently available Best Actress awards in UK Theatre for a single performance. This accolade was achieved by her performance in Yerma.

== Theatre ==
=== BroadwayWorld Awards ===
| Year | Category | Nominated work | Result | Ref. |
|---|---|---|---|---|
| 2017 | Best Actress | Yerma | Won | |

=== Critics' Circle Theatre Awards ===
| Year | Category | Nominated work | Result | Ref. |
|---|---|---|---|---|
| 2016 | Best Actress | Yerma | Won | |

=== Drama Desk Awards ===
| Year | Category | Nominated work | Result | Ref. |
|---|---|---|---|---|
| 2018 | Outstanding Actress in a Play | Yerma | Nominated | |

=== Drama League Awards ===
| Year | Category | Nominated work | Result | Ref. |
|---|---|---|---|---|
| 2018 | Distinguished Performance | Yerma | Nominated | |

=== Evening Standard Theatre Awards ===
| Year | Category | Nominated work | Result | Ref. |
|---|---|---|---|---|
| 2007 | Best Actress | Treats | Nominated | |
| 2013 | Best Actress | The Effect | Nominated | |
| 2014 | Best Actress | Great Britain | Nominated | |
| 2016 | Best Actress | Yerma | Won | |

=== Glamour Awards ===
| Year | Category | Nominated work | Result | Ref. |
|---|---|---|---|---|
| 2014 | Best Theatre Actress | Great Britain | Won | |
| 2017 | Best Theatre Actress | Yerma | Won | |

=== Laurence Olivier Awards ===
| Year | Category | Nominated work | Result | Ref. |
|---|---|---|---|---|
| 2013 | Best Actress | The Effect | Nominated | |
| 2017 | Best Actress | Yerma | Won | |

=== WhatsOnStage Awards ===
| Year | Category | Nominated work | Result | Ref. |
|---|---|---|---|---|
| 2013 | Best Actress in a Play | The Effect | Nominated | |
| 2015 | Best Actress in a Play | Great Britain | Won | |
| 2017 | Best Actress in a Play | Yerma | Won | |

== Television ==
=== Airlock Alpha Portal Awards ===
| Year | Category | Nominated work | Result | Ref. |
|---|---|---|---|---|
| 2009 | Best Special Guest | Doctor Who: "The Stolen Earth" | Nominated | |

=== BAFTA Cymru ===
| Year | Category | Nominated work | Result | Ref. |
|---|---|---|---|---|
| 2006 | Best Actress | Doctor Who | Nominated | |
| 2007 | Best Actress | Doctor Who: "Doomsday" | Nominated | |

=== BBC's "Drama Best Of" ===
| Year | Category | Nominee(s) | Result | Ref. |
|---|---|---|---|---|
| 2005 | Best Actress | Doctor Who | Won | |
| 2005 | Most Desirable Star | Doctor Who | Won | |
| 2006 | Best Actress | Doctor Who | Won | |
| 2006 | Favourite Moment | Doctor Who (Rose's exit) | Won | |

=== Broadcasting Press Guild Awards ===
| Year | Category | Nominated work | Result | Ref. |
|---|---|---|---|---|
| 2006 | Best Actress | Doctor Who / ShakespeaRe-Told | Nominated | |

=== British Academy Television Awards ===
| Year | Category | Nominated work | Result | Ref. |
|---|---|---|---|---|
| 2019 | Best Supporting Actress | Collateral | Nominated | |
| 2021 | Best Actress | I Hate Suzie | Nominated | |
| 2021 | Drama Series (nominated as a creator and executive producer) | I Hate Suzie | Nominated | |
| 2023 | Best Actress | I Hate Suzie Too | Nominated | |
| 2025 | Best Actress | Scoop | Nominated | |

=== Constellation Awards ===
| Year | Category | Nominated work | Result | Ref. |
|---|---|---|---|---|
| 2014 | Best Female Performance in a Science Fiction Television Episode | Doctor Who: "The Day of the Doctor" | Nominated | |

=== Cosmopolitan Ultimate Women Awards ===
| Year | Category | Nominated work | Result | Ref. |
|---|---|---|---|---|
| 2006 | Ultimate TV Actress | Doctor Who | Won | |

=== Edinburgh International Television Festival ===
| Year | Category | Nominated work | Result | Ref. |
|---|---|---|---|---|
| 2021 | Best TV Actor – Drama | I Hate Suzie | Nominated | |

=== EWwy Awards ===
| Year | Category | Nominated work | Result | Ref. |
|---|---|---|---|---|
| 2009 | Best Actress in a Comedy Series | Secret Diary of a Call Girl | Nominated | |

=== Fangoria Chainsaw Awards ===
| Year | Category | Nominated work | Result | Ref. |
|---|---|---|---|---|
| 2015 | Best TV Supporting Actress | Penny Dreadful | Nominated | |
| 2016 | Best TV Supporting Actress | Penny Dreadful | Nominated | |

=== Glamour Awards ===
| Year | Category | Nominated work | Result | Ref. |
|---|---|---|---|---|
| 2005 | Best TV Actress | Doctor Who | Nominated | |
| 2006 | Best TV Actress | Doctor Who | Won | |
| 2010 | Best TV Actress | Secret Diary of a Call Girl | Won | |

=== Gold Derby Awards ===
| Year | Category | Nominated work | Result | Ref. |
|---|---|---|---|---|
| 2009 | Breakthrough Performer of the Year | Secret Diary of a Call Girl | Nominated | |

=== International Emmy Awards ===
| Year | Category | Nominated work | Result | Ref. |
|---|---|---|---|---|
| 2023 | International Emmy Award for Best Actress | I Hate Suzie Too | Nominated | |

=== International Online Cinema Awards ===
| Year | Category | Nominated work | Result | Ref. |
|---|---|---|---|---|
| 2021 | Best Actress in a Drama Series | I Hate Suzie Too | Nominated | |
| 2023 | Best Actress in a Drama Series | I Hate Suzie Too | Nominated | |

=== National Television Awards ===
| Year | Category | Nominated work | Result | Ref. |
|---|---|---|---|---|
| 2005 | Most Popular Actress | Doctor Who | Won | |
| 2006 | Most Popular Actress | Doctor Who | Won | |

=== Rose d'Or ===
| Year | Category | Nominated work | Result | Ref. |
|---|---|---|---|---|
| 2008 | Special Award for Best Entertainer | Secret Diary of a Call Girl | Nominated | |

=== SFX Awards ===
| Year | Category | Nominated work | Result | Ref. |
|---|---|---|---|---|
| 2005 | Best Actress | Doctor Who | Won | |
| 2007 | Best Actress | Doctor Who | Won | |

=== South Bank Show Awards ===
| Year | Category | Nominated work | Result | Ref. |
|---|---|---|---|---|
| 2006 | The Times Breakthrough Award – Rising British Talent | Doctor Who | Won | |

=== Television and Radio Industries Club Awards ===
| Year | Category | Nominated work | Result | Ref. |
|---|---|---|---|---|
| 2006 | Best New Talent | Doctor Who | Won | |

=== TV Quick Awards ===
| Year | Category | Nominated work | Result | Ref. |
|---|---|---|---|---|
| 2006 | Best Actress | Doctor Who | Won | |
| 2007 | Best Actress | Mansfield Park | Nominated | |
| 2009 | Best Actress | Secret Diary of a Call Girl | Nominated | |

=== TV Scholar Awards ===
| Year | Category | Nominated work | Result | Ref. |
|---|---|---|---|---|
| 2023 | Best Lead Performance in a Comedy | I Hate Suzie Too | Nominated | |

== Film ==
=== Göteborg Film Festival Awards ===
| Year | Category | Nominated work | Result | Ref. |
|---|---|---|---|---|
| 2020 | Ingmar Bergman International Debut Award | Rare Beasts | Nominated | |

=== National Film Awards ===
| Year | Category | Nominated work | Result | Ref. |
|---|---|---|---|---|
| 2022 | Best Actress | Rare Beasts | Nominated | |
| 2022 | Outstanding Performance | Rare Beasts | Nominated | |
| 2022 | Best Director | Rare Beasts | Nominated | |

=== SXSW Film Festival Awards ===
| Year | Category | Nominated work | Result | Ref. |
|---|---|---|---|---|
| 2020 | Adam Yauch Hörnblowér Award | Rare Beasts | Nominated | |

== Music ==
=== Brit Awards ===
| Year | Category | Nominated work | Result | Ref. |
|---|---|---|---|---|
| 1999 | Best British Newcomer | Herself | Nominated | |
| 1999 | Best British Female | Herself | Nominated | |

=== MTV Europe Music Awards ===
| Year | Category | Nominated work | Result | Ref. |
|---|---|---|---|---|
| 1998 | MTV Select — UK and Ireland | Herself | Nominated | |

=== NME Awards ===
| Year | Category | Nominated work | Result | Ref. |
|---|---|---|---|---|
| 1999 | Worst Record | "Because We Want To" | 1st place | |

=== Smash Hits Poll Winners Party ===
| Year | Category | Nominated work | Result | Ref. |
|---|---|---|---|---|
| 1998 | Best New Act | Herself | 2nd place | |
| 1998 | Princess of Pop | Herself | 1st place | |
| 1998 | Best Female Solo Star | Herself | 1st place | |
| 1998 | Most Fanciable Female on the Planet | Herself | 2nd place | |
| 1998 | Best Dressed Female | Herself | 1st place | |
| 1998 | Worst Female Singer | Herself | 1st place | |
| 1998 | Worst Single | "Because We Want To" | 1st place | |
| 1998 | Worst Album | Honey to the B | 1st place | |
| 1998 | Sad Loser of 1998 | Herself | 1st place | |
| 1999 | Sad Loser of 1999 | Herself | 1st place | |
| 2000 | Best Female Solo Star | Herself | 4th place | |
| 2000 | Most Fanciable Female on the Planet | Herself | 9th place | |
| 2000 | Best Dressed Female | Herself | 2nd place | |
| 2000 | Best Dancer in Pop | Herself | 2nd place | |
| 2000 | Worst Female Singer | Herself | 2nd place | |
| 2000 | Worst Album | Walk of Life | 4th place | |
| 2000 | Worst Dressed Person | Herself | 4th place | |
| 2000 | Sad Loser of 2000 | Herself | 8th place | |
| 2000 | Best Outfit | Herself | 1st place | |
