= Walk of Life (disambiguation) =

"Walk of Life" is a 1985 single by Dire Straits.

Walk of Life may also refer to:

- Walk of Life (album), a 2000 album by Billie Piper
  - "Walk of Life" (Billie Piper song), 2000
- "Walk of Life", a 1998 song by Spice Girls from the Sabrina, the Teenage Witch soundtrack
- Walk of Life, an annual walk at the Tamworth Country Music Festival
- Walk of life, an expression meaning occupation, role, social class, or lifestyle, usually plural as all walks of life

== See also ==
- Walks of Life, a 2007 album by Gina Jeffreys
- Walk of My Life, a 2015 album by Kumi Koda
