= Growing Pains (disambiguation) =

Growing Pains is a 1985–1992 American television sitcom.

Growing Pains or Growing Pain may also refer to:

- Growing pains, pains in the limbs during childhood

== Film and television ==
- Growing Pains (1928 film), an Our Gang short subject, now lost
- Growing Pains (1984 film), an American teen comedy directed by Robert Houston
- The Growing Pains Movie, a 2000 film based on the American sitcom
- Growing Pains: Return of the Seavers, a 2004 sequel to the above film
- Growing Pains (British TV series), a 1992–1993 comedy drama series
- "Growing Pains" (Ben 10), a 2017 episode
- "Growing Pains" (The Flash), a 2021 episode
- "Growing Pains" (The New Batman Adventures), a 1998 episode
- "Growing Pains" (The Vampire Diaries), a 2012 episode
- "Growing Pains" (X-Men: Evolution), a 2001 episode

== Music ==
=== Albums ===
- Growing Pains (Dinosaur Pile-Up album), 2010
- Growing Pains (Json album), 2012
- Growing Pains (Mary J. Blige album), 2007
- Growing, Pains, by Billie Myers, 1997
- Growing Pains, by Lexii Alijai, 2017
- Growing Pains, by Maria Mena, 2015
- Growing Pains, an EP by 24kGoldn, 2024
- Growing Pains, an EP by L Devine, 2017

=== Songs ===
- "Growing Pains" (Alessia Cara song), 2018
- "Growing Pains", by Birdy from Beautiful Lies, 2016
- "Growing Pains", by Ethel Cain from Carpet Bed, 2019
- "Growing Pains", by La Roux from La Roux, 2009
- "Growing Pains", by Ludacris from Word of Mouf, 2001
- "Growing Pains", by Neck Deep from Wishful Thinking, 2014
- "Growing Pains", by Super Junior-D&E from The Beat Goes On, 2015
- "Growing Pain", by Soul Asylum from Made to Be Broken, 1986
- "Growing Pain", by Tomorrow X Together from The Name Chapter: Freefall, 2023
- "Growing Pain", by Yoko Ono from Feeling the Space, 1973

== Other uses ==
- Growing Pains (book), a 2006 autobiography by Billie Piper

== See also ==
- The Growing Paynes, a 1948–1949 American TV sitcom
