= I Hate Suzie =

Television series

- Also known as: I Hate Suzie Too (series 2)
- Genre: Dark comedy; Comedy-drama
- Created by: Lucy Prebble; Billie Piper
- Written by: Lucy Prebble
- Directed by: Georgi Banks-Davies; Anthony Neilson; Dawn Shadforth
- Starring: Billie Piper; Leila Farzad; Daniel Ings; Nathaniel Martello-White
- Composers: Johnny Lloyd; Nathan Coen
- Country of origin: United Kingdom
- Original language: English
- No. of series: 2
- No. of episodes: 11

Production
- Executive producers: Lucy Prebble; Billie Piper; Julie Gardner; Liz Lewin; Cameron Roach; Andrea Dewsbery
- Cinematography: Tim Sidell; Luke Bryant; Patrick Meller
- Editors: Joe Randall-Cutler; Izabella Curry; Fin Oates; Jo Walker
- Running time: 32–50 minutes
- Production companies: Bad Wolf; Sky Studios

Original release
- Network: Sky Atlantic
- Release: 27 August 2020 – 20 December 2022

I Hate Suzie (stylised as I HATE SUZIE.) is a British dark comedy-drama television series created by Lucy Prebble and Billie Piper. Written by Prebble, it was produced by Bad Wolf in association with Sky Studios.

The series marks the third collaboration between Prebble and Piper, who previously worked together on Secret Diary of a Call Girl (2007–2011) and The Effect (2012). I Hate Suzie follows the life of actress Suzie Pickles (Piper), whose life is thrown into turmoil when her phone is hacked and compromising photographs of her are leaked. Each episode is focused on "one of the eight stages of trauma" that Suzie experiences, a take on the five stages of grief.

I Hate Suzie premiered on Sky Atlantic and Now on 27 August 2020. It received critical acclaim from television critics for its writing, directing, and Piper's performance. It was recognised by several publications as one of the best television programmes of the year. In February 2021, it was renewed for a second series, titled I Hate Suzie Too (stylised as I HATE SUZIE TOO.), which premiered on 20 December 2022.

== Premise ==
Suzie Pickles (Piper) is a former teenage pop star and television actress. After her phone is hacked and compromising photos of her are leaked, Suzie struggles to keep her marriage to Cob (Daniel Ings) together and protect her deaf son Frank (Matthew Jordan-Caws). Meanwhile, Naomi (Leila Farzad), Suzie's manager and friend, attempts to keep her career afloat.

== Cast and characters ==
- Billie Piper as Suzie Pickles
- Leila Farzad as Naomi Jones
- Daniel Ings as Cob Betterton
- Nathaniel Martello-White as Carter Vaughan
- Matthew Jordan-Caws as Frank
- Emma Smithin as Young Suzie
- Layton Williams as Adam Jackson (series 2)

== Episodes ==
Series	Episodes	Originally released
1	8	27 August 2020
2	3	20 December 2022

=== Season 1 (2020) ===
No.	Title	Directed by	Written by	Original release date
1	"Shock"	Georgi Banks-Davies	Lucy Prebble	27 August 2020
Compromising pictures of Suzie have been hacked from her phone. Her apparently perfect life spectacularly implodes.
2	"Denial"	Georgi Banks-Davies	Lucy Prebble	27 August 2020
When no one believes her claim that the sex photos are fake, Suzie parties while her family life hangs in the balance.
3	"Fear"	Georgi Banks-Davies	Lucy Prebble	27 August 2020
Working to save her marriage, Suzie agrees that maybe working with the man in question isn't the best idea. Naomi attempts to keep the press at bay.
4	"Shame"	Georgi Banks-Davies	Lucy Prebble	27 August 2020
Suzie gives a disastrous interview and struggles to make peace with her own desires. Meanwhile, Naomi is in hard-core damage control mode.
5	"Bargaining"	Anthony Neilson	Lucy Prebble	27 August 2020
Cob decides it's his turn to let loose and Suzie is forced to combine her dinner with her producers with Cob's wild night out.
6	"Guilt"	Georgi Banks-Davies	Lucy Prebble	27 August 2020
Suzie is on the lookout for a career change and auditions for a new musical. Family politics come to light with Suzie's parents.
7	"Anger"	Anthony Neilson	Lucy Prebble	27 August 2020
Suzie tries to keep her cool and focus on balancing work and family. Naomi finds herself struggling.
8	"Acceptance"	Georgi Banks-Davies	Lucy Prebble	27 August 2020
Suzie has to come to terms with her situation and make some big decisions.

=== Season 2 (2022): I Hate Suzie Too ===
No. overall	No. in season	Title	Directed by	Written by	Original release date
9	1	"Episode 1"	Dawn Shadforth	Lucy Prebble	20 December 2022
10	2	"Episode 2"	Dawn Shadforth	Lucy Prebble	20 December 2022
11	3	"Episode 3"	Dawn Shadforth	Lucy Prebble	20 December 2022

== Production ==
=== Conception ===
Following their collaboration on Secret Diary of a Call Girl and The Effect, Prebble and Piper developed a close friendship. Piper expressed interest to Prebble in working together on another project. The inspiration for the story came from the frequent correspondence between the two, who would share their struggles of identity and womanhood. Prebble came up with the idea for a story centered around a phone hack. She structured the story around an idea of "eight stages of trauma or grief", a take on the five stages of grief, with each episode focusing on one of the stages. Each episode was created to have the feel of a standalone mini-film. In February 2021, it was renewed for a second series.

=== Filming ===
Interior scenes for I Hate Suzie were filmed entirely on location in and around London. Some exterior scenes were shot on-location at Park Avenue and Mimms Hall Road in the town Potters Bar, Hertfordshire. For the episode "Denial", scenes featuring Suzie and Naomi at a sci-fi convention were filmed at the ExCeL London during the MCM London Comic Con in October 2019.

=== Music ===
The musical score to I Hate Suzie was composed by Johnny Lloyd and Nathan Coen, who previously worked with Piper on her directorial debut Rare Beasts. "Before we even knew what the series was gonna look like, we were already kind of pulling together ideas and sending them to Lucy [Prebble] while she was writing it," Coen said. Lloyd described the process of scoring as "challenging" to create continuity and embody different emotions each episode.

== Broadcast ==
I Hate Suzie premiered on Sky Atlantic on 27 August 2020, with all episodes made available to watch on Sky's Now subscription service that same day. The following day, it was made available in Australia on the streaming service Stan. In October 2020, the show was acquired for American audiences by HBO Max. The series had its US television debut on HBO Max on 19 November. In Latin America the series premiered on 7 November 2020 on Warner TV. On 9 September 2021, it was made available in Brazil on the streaming service Globoplay. The second series premiered on 20 December 2022.

== Reception ==
=== Ratings ===
The premiere episode "Shock" received an overnight rating of 95,000 viewers across two screenings. After seven days, the ratings rose to 532,000. Twenty-eight days later, the episode's ratings rose to a total of 987,000 viewers, including 41,000 watching from other devices. The show became Sky Atlantic's second most-viewed show for the third quarter of 2020, behind the miniseries The Third Day.

=== Critical reception ===
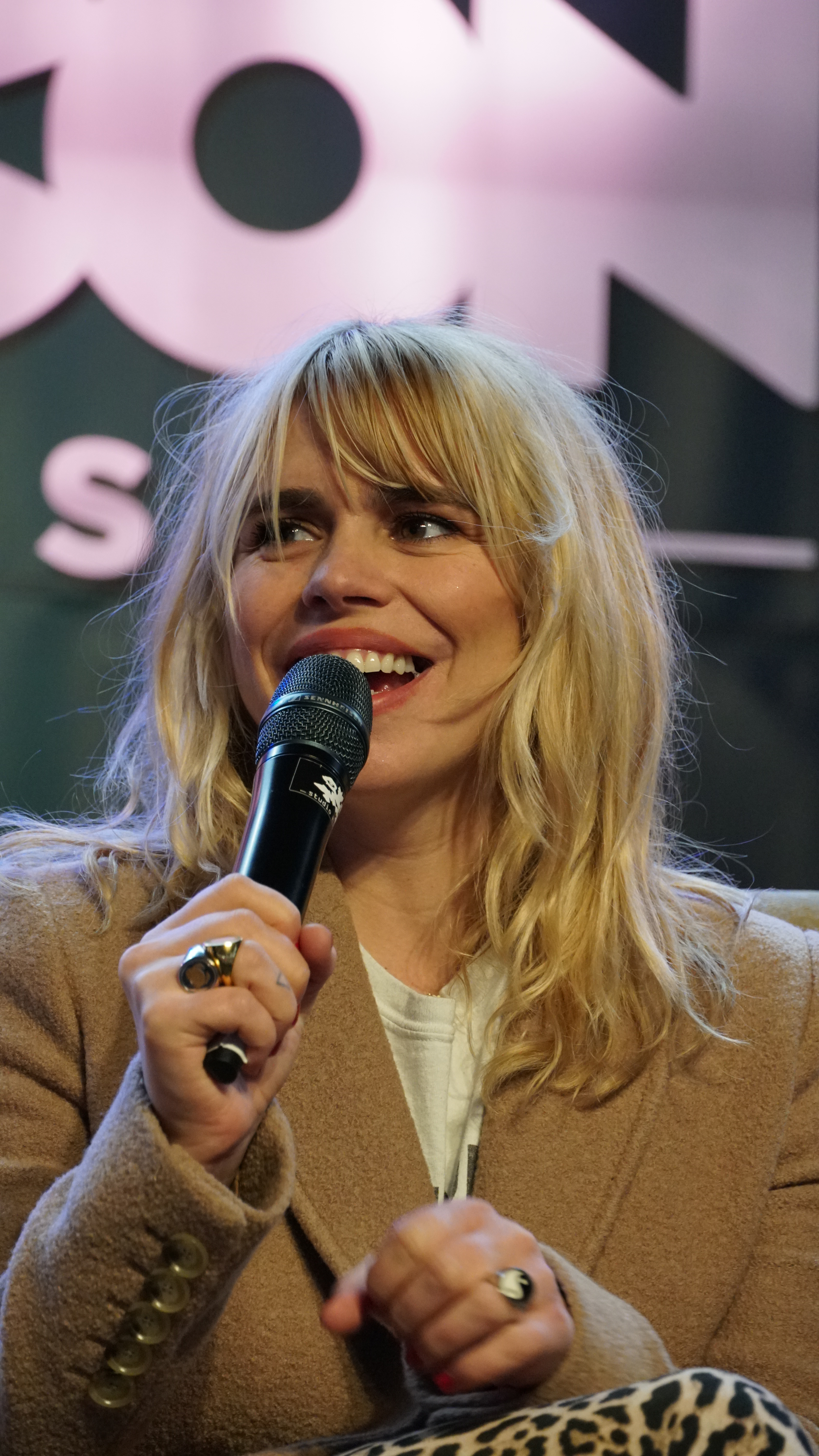
Piper's performance was praised by critics.

I Hate Suzie was acclaimed by television critics, who praised the writing and Piper's performance. The review aggregator website Rotten Tomatoes reported an approval rating of 95% with an average score of 8.1/10, based on 37 reviews. The website's critical consensus reads, "Gazing into the eye of the celebrity storm with frenzied style, I Hate Suzie is a ruthless satire on stardom that is effortlessly carried by Billie Piper's manic performance." Metacritic, which uses a weighted average, assigned the first season a score of 85 out of 100 based on 11 critics, indicating "Universal acclaim".

Writing for The Telegraph, Chris Bennion gave the show 5 out of 5 stars, stating "I Hate Suzie is a glorious mess of ideas, a potent, fizzing monument to the creativity of its makers." Lucy Mangan of The Guardian praised the collaboration between Prebble and Piper, calling the show a "wild ride that feels like an absolute gift." Kristen Baldwin in her review for Entertainment Weekly gave the series an "A" rating, calling it a "bloody brilliant exploration of modern womanhood" that "tells a wholly unique story about the liberation that comes from total exposure."

Sonia Saraiya of Vanity Fair wrote, "I Hate Suzie is a masterclass in tone... a portrait of vulnerability that bewitches not by prettifying itself, or making itself ugly, but instead with stark, unfiltered honesty." Ed Cumming of The Independent wrote, "Piper has a rare gift for eliciting sympathy... [w]hat emerges is a black-comedy-horror about female friendship, modern fame, and the impossibility of true privacy in a world where everyone has an online video camera in their pockets."

In a more critical review, Allison Keene of Paste deemed the series "messy, ambitious, chic, yet ultimately a little shallow and out of focus." However, she reserved praise for Piper's acting, calling her performance "astonishingly open". Matt Walsh of TV Guide wrote: "You might squirm but will never hate the excellent Piper, as Suzie careens from self-pity to self-disgust in a surreal blur of debauched despair." Writing for Decider, Joel Keller found the first episode to be "an effective exercise in seeing a person's life fall apart around them in short order" but was more "intrigued with seeing Piper's interpretation of how Suzie tries to put the pieces back together."

=== Critics year-end lists ===
I Hate Suzie appeared on several critics year-end top ten lists:

- 2nd – Allison Shoemaker, The A.V. Club
- 2nd – Hannah Jane Parkinson, The Guardian
- 4th – Chris Bennion, The Telegraph
- 5th – Kristen Baldwin, Entertainment Weekly
- 6th – Staff, GQ UK
- 6th – Staff, NME
- 7th – Jeanne Jakle, San Antonio Express-News
- 9th – Brian Donaldson, The List
- 10th – Staff, Empire
- 10th – Staff, Total Film
- 13th – Staff, RogerEbert.com
- 15th – Staff, Thrillist
- 19th – Staff, Den of Geek
- Best New Shows (not ranked) – CNET
- Top 10 (not ranked) – Naomi Gordon, Harper's Bazaar
- Top 13 (not ranked) – Caroline Framke, Variety
- Top 20 (not ranked) – Staff, Evening Standard

=== Awards and nominations ===
Award	Date of ceremony	Category	Recipients	Result
RTS Craft & Design Awards	23 November 2020	Editing – Drama	Izabella Curry	Nominated
RTS Programme Awards	16 March 2021	Drama Series	I Hate Suzie	Nominated
RTS Programme Awards	16 March 2021	Writer – Drama	Lucy Prebble	Nominated
British Academy Television Craft Awards	24 May 2021	Best Writer: Drama	Lucy Prebble	Nominated
British Academy Television Craft Awards	24 May 2021	Best Emerging Talent: Fiction	Georgi Banks-Davies	Won
British Academy Television Awards	6 June 2021	Best Drama Series	I Hate Suzie	Nominated
British Academy Television Awards	6 June 2021	Best Actress	Billie Piper	Nominated
British Academy Television Awards	6 June 2021	Best Supporting Actress	Leila Farzad	Nominated
Irish Film & Television Awards	4 July 2021	Makeup and Hair	Siobhan Harper-Ryan	Nominated
Writers' Guild of Great Britain	14 February 2022	Best Long Form TV Drama	Lucy Prebble	Nominated
Royal Television Society Programme Awards	28 March 2023	Actor: Female	Billie Piper	Nominated
Royal Television Society Programme Awards	28 March 2023	Writer - Drama	Lucy Prebble	Won
British Academy Television Awards	14 May 2023	Best Actress	Billie Piper	Nominated
International Emmy Awards	20 November 2023	Best Actress	Billie Piper	Nominated
