= Girlfriend (Billie song) =

1998 single by Billie Piper

Single by Billie

from the album Honey to the B
- B-side: "Love Groove"
- Released: 5 October 1998
- Studio: Ridge Farm (Surrey, England); Marcus (London, England)
- Length: 3:50 (main version); 3:37 (radio version)
- Label: Innocent; Virgin
- Songwriters: Dion Rambo; Jacques Richmond
- Producers: Jim Marr, Wendy Page (album version); Cutfather & Joe (radio mix)

Billie singles chronology
"Because We Want To" (1998)	"Girlfriend" (1998)	"She Wants You" (1998)

"Girlfriend" is a song by English singer and actress Billie, released in October 1998 as the second single from her debut album, Honey to the B (1998). It reached number one in the United Kingdom, making her the youngest and first female solo singer to reach the top spot with her first two singles. Outside the UK, "Girlfriend" peaked at number two in New Zealand and reached the top 20 in Ireland. On the American track listing for Honey to the B, the radio mix replaces the original album version. The B-side, "Love Groove", is also included on Honey to the B.

== Release ==
"Girlfriend" was released in the United Kingdom on 5 October 1998 as two CD singles and a cassette single. A radio edit with additional production by Cutfather & Joe was released for the single which differs significantly from the album version. The Australian single has become one of Billie's rarest CD singles. The cover for the Australian single differs slightly, as on the UK cover, it says, "Includes Tin Tin Out Mix & Exclusive Track", while on the Australian cover, it says "Includes Because We Want To". In Japan, "Girlfriend" was released as a double A-side with "She Wants You"; it was released as Billie's second Japanese single on 10 March 1999.

== Chart performance ==
"Girlfriend" debuted on the UK Singles Chart on 11 October 1998 at number one. It remained on the chart for 12 weeks and was certified silver. In Ireland, the track reached number 12 on the Irish Singles Chart. "Girlfriend" debuted on the Swedish Singles Chart at number 37 on 29 October 1998. The following week, it peaked at number 22. In Australia, "Girlfriend" debuted on the ARIA Singles Chart at number 49 on 6 December 1998. Five weeks later, it peaked at number 35. The track debuted in New Zealand on 29 November 1998 at number three. It reached number two, its highest position, three weeks later and remained on the New Zealand Singles Chart for 18 weeks.

== Music video ==
The video (directed by Phil Griffin) starts in an empty warehouse where several teenage boys are skateboarding. Billie and her friends sit on a sofa, admiring them. They soon get up and sing the chorus of "Girlfriend". Another boy arrives in a truck and Billie plays a game of pool with him. The two spend time together until the video ends. Cutscenes of Billie and her friends dancing are seen during the chorus. The video uses the single version of the song rather than the original album version.

== Track listings ==
UK CD1 and European maxi-CD single

1. "Girlfriend" (radio mix) – 3:55
2. "Love Groove" – 4:29
3. "Girlfriend" (Tin Tin Out mix) – 7:26

UK CD2

1. "Girlfriend" (radio mix) – 3:55
2. "Girlfriend" (D-Influence Real Live mix) – 4:35
3. "Girlfriend" (Sgt. Rock mix) – 6:17
4. "Girlfriend" (video) – 3:51

UK cassette single

A1. "Girlfriend" (radio mix) – 3:55
A2. "Love Groove" – 4:29
B1. Interview – 10:18

Australian maxi-CD single

1. "Girlfriend" (radio mix)
2. "Love Groove"
3. "Girlfriend" (Tin Tin Out mix)
4. "Because We Want To" (radio mix)

== Credits and personnel ==
Credits are lifted from the Honey to the B album booklet.

Studios

- Recorded at Ridge Farm (Surrey, England) and Marcus Studios (London, England)
- Mixed at Metropolis Studios (London, England)

Personnel

- Dion Rambo – writing
- Jacques Richmond – writing
- Billie Piper – vocals
- Wendy Page – backing vocals, vocal arrangement, production
- Jim Marr – keyboards, programming, production
- Yak Bondy – additional programming
- Pete Craigie – recording, mixing
- Steve Cooper – assistant engineering (Ridge Farm)
- Michelle Barry – assistant engineering (Marcus)
- Matt Tait – assistant engineering (Metropolis)

== Charts ==
=== Weekly charts ===
Chart (1998)	Peak position
Australia (ARIA)	35
Europe (Eurochart Hot 100)	6
Iceland (Íslenski Listinn Topp 40)	32
Ireland (IRMA)	12
New Zealand (Recorded Music NZ)	2
Scottish Singles Sales (Official Charts)	1
Sweden (Sverigetopplistan)	22
UK Singles (Official Charts)	1
UK Airplay (Music Week)	22

=== Year-end charts ===
Chart (1998)	Position
UK Singles (OCC)	49

== Certifications ==
Region	Certification	Certified units/sales
New Zealand (RMNZ)	Gold	5,000^{*}
United Kingdom (BPI)	Silver	200,000^{^}
^{*} Sales figures based on certification alone.^{^} Shipments figures based on certification alone.
