= Day & Night (Billie Piper song) =

2000 single by Billie Piper

Single by Billie Piper

from the album Walk of Life
- B-side: "Tinted Eyes"
- Released: 15 May 2000
- Studio: StarGate (Norway)
- Genre: Pop
- Length: 3:15
- Label: Innocent; Virgin
- Songwriters: Billie Piper; Eliot Kennedy; Mark Cawley; Tim Lever; Mike Percy
- Producers: Steelworks; Stargate

Billie Piper singles chronology
"Thank ABBA for the Music" (1999)	"Day & Night" (2000)	"Something Deep Inside" (2000)

"Day & Night" is a song by English singer turned actress Billie Piper. The song was written by Piper, Eliot Kennedy, Mark Cawley, Mike Percy and Tim Lever for Piper's second album Walk of Life (2000). It was released as the album's lead single on 15 May 2000 to positive reviews from music critics. It was a commercial success, reaching number one in the United Kingdom and receiving a silver certification from the British Phonographic Industry (BPI).

== Critical reception ==
The song received positive reviews from music critics. Yahoo! reviewer Jackie Flynn wrote that the song was a "slick piece of dominatrix dance" with "big buffed chords and spike-heel beats". Peter Robinson of NME described "Day & Night" as "exciting" and the magazine wrote that the song was "somewhat harder and American sounding" than her previous singles.

== Chart performance ==
"Day & Night" debuted at number one on the UK Singles Chart on 21 May 2000, giving Piper the record for the youngest female to accrue three number-one hits in the UK, which had originally been set by Britney Spears two weeks prior. It remained on the chart for 13 weeks before exiting the top 100 in August 2000. In May 2000, the single was certified silver by the BPI. This was Piper's third and final chart-topper in the UK—jointly the most achieved by a British female artist at this point. The track also reached the top 20 in Ireland and the top 50 in Flanders and the Netherlands. In Australia, "Day & Night" debuted on the ARIA Singles Chart on 4 June 2000 at number 16. Eight weeks later, the song peaked at number eight. The track debuted in New Zealand on 4 June 2000 at number 43. It peaked at number six three weeks later and remained on the chart for 15 weeks.

== Music video ==
Piper in the final scenes of the video, throwing washing powder around a laundrette.

The music video for "Day & Night" was directed by Cameron Casey. It features Piper dancing at a nightclub with a group of friends. The video begins with Piper and three friends walking down a street at night, looking for an exclusive nightclub. After being allowed in, Piper and a group of male dancers begin to perform a dance routine. She is then shown dancing with a group of female dancers on a brightly lit street. The third scene features Piper dancing in a pink room. The video concludes with Piper and her dancers in a laundrette, dancing on top of washing machines and throwing washing powder around the room. The video premiered in the UK on 9 March 2000.

== Track listings ==
UK CD1 and Australasian CD single

1. "Day & Night" (Stargate mix) – 3:15
2. "Day & Night" (Almighty Club mix) – 8:04
3. "Day & Night" (Robbie Rivera's Bombastic vocal mix) – 7:05
4. "Day & Night" (video)

UK CD2

1. "Day & Night" (Stargate mix) – 3:15
2. "Tinted Eyes" – 3:57
3. "Day & Night" (Friday Hope mix) – 7:13

UK and New Zealand cassette single

A1. "Day & Night" (Stargate mix) – 3:15
A2. "Honey to the Bee" (Hex Hector mix) – 4:32
B1. "Day & Night" (Sleaze Sisters anthem) – 6:40

== Credits and personnel ==
Credits are lifted from the UK CD1 liner notes.

Studio

- Recorded and mixed at StarGate Studios (Norway)

Personnel

- Billie Piper – writing, vocals
- Eliot Kennedy – writing, production
- Mark Cawley – writing
- Tim Lever – writing, production
- Mike Percy – writing, production
- StarGate – additional production
- Joe Pearson – artwork design
- Enrique Badulescu – photography

== Charts ==
=== Weekly charts ===
Weekly chart performance for "Day & Night"
Chart (2000)	Peak position
Australia (ARIA)	8
Belgium (Ultratop 50 Flanders)	38
Belgium (Ultratip Bubbling Under Wallonia)	11
Estonia (Eesti Top 20)	2
Europe (Eurochart Hot 100)	9
Iceland (Íslenski Listinn Topp 40)	24
Ireland (IRMA)	13
Netherlands (Single Top 100)	47
New Zealand (Recorded Music NZ)	6
Scotland Singles (OCC)	1
Sweden (Sverigetopplistan)	52
Switzerland (Schweizer Hitparade)	62
UK Singles (OCC)	1
UK Airplay (Music Week)	10

=== Year-end charts ===
Year-end chart performance for "Day & Night"
Chart (2000)	Position
Australia (ARIA)	42
UK Singles (OCC)	47

== Certifications ==
Certifications for "Day & Night"
Region	Certification	Certified units/sales
Australia (ARIA)	Platinum	70,000^{^}
New Zealand (RMNZ)	Gold	5,000^{*}
United Kingdom (BPI)	Silver	200,000^{^}
^{*} Sales figures based on certification alone.^{^} Shipments figures based on certification alone.

== Release history ==
Release dates and formats for "Day & Night"
Region	Date	Format(s)	Label(s)	Ref.
United Kingdom	15 May 2000	CD; cassette	Innocent; Virgin	
New Zealand	3 June 2000	CD; cassette	Innocent; Virgin	
