= She Wants You =

1996 single by Dara Rolins

Song by Dara Rolins

from the album What You See Is What You Get
- Released: 1996
- Length: 3:38
- Label: Ariola; BMG
- Songwriters: Tim Lawson; Pam Sheyne
- Producer: The Noisemakers

"She Wants You"

Single by Billie

from the album Honey to the B
- B-side: "It Takes Two"; "Last Christmas"; "So Deep"
- Released: 7 December 1998
- Studio: Ridge Farm (Surrey, England); Marcus (London, England)
- Genre: Dance-pop
- Length: 3:38
- Label: Innocent; Virgin
- Songwriters: Tim Lawson; Pam Sheyne
- Producers: Wendy Page; Jim Marr

Billie singles chronology
"Girlfriend" (1998)	"She Wants You" (1998)	"Honey to the Bee" (1999)

"She Wants You" is a song originally performed by Slovak singer Dara Rolins. The song, written by Tim Lawson and Pam Sheyne, was issued on Rolins' studio album What You See Is What You Get in 1996. The song then became a hit single in 1998 when English singer turned actress Billie covered it.

== Background and release ==
Originally sung by Slovak singer Dara Dara Rolins for her 1996 album What You See Is What You Get, "She Wants You" became a hit single when English singer turned actress Billie recorded it. Her version was released in the United Kingdom on 7 December 1998 as two CD singles and a cassette single. The first CD includes two cover songs as B-sides—"It Takes Two" by Marvin Gaye and Kim Weston and "Last Christmas" by Wham!—while the second contains various mixes of "She Wants You" plus an interactive element. In Japan, "She Wants You" was released as a double A-side with Billie's previous single, "Girlfriend", as the album's second single on 10 March 1999. In the United States, the song served as Billie's debut single. The CD single released in the US contains two mixes of "She Wants You" and an interactive element of "Because We Want To".

== Reception ==
The song received positive reviews from music critics. Yahoo! reviewer Rob O'Connor compared "She Wants You" to 1970s era disco music and wrote that the song is "greeting-card pop" with "factory beats designed for great dancing". Heather Phares, in a review for AllMusic, called the song an "upbeat dance-pop tune" that "captures [Billie's] youthful energy and exuberance". The single reached number three on the UK Singles Chart, becoming her third consecutive top-three hit. The single also reached number four in New Zealand and was Billie's only song to appear on any US Billboard chart, peaking at number 23 on the Bubbling Under Hot 100 and number nine on the Dance Club Play chart.

== Music video ==
"She Wants You" featured two music videos directed by Phil Griffin.

=== Original video ===
The original video features Billie dancing on a stage in a green catsuit. Throughout the video she is surrounded by several colourfully dressed male dancers. There were cut scenes of Billie and some of the other male dancers mucking around the camera close-up. Innocent had to decide which video to include on the enhanced single and chose the other video.

=== Alternative video ===
In the alternative video, Billie visits a drive-in with a group of girl friends. Scenes from the original video, which are featured as the film at the drive-in, are used as cut scenes. One by one her friends hang out with guys before Billie sees her 'perfect man'. Innocent had to decide which video to include on the enhanced single and chose this video.

== Track listings ==
UK CD1

1. "She Wants You" (album version) – 3:38
2. "It Takes Two" – 3:50
3. "Last Christmas" – 4:59

UK CD2

1. "She Wants You" (album version) – 3:38
2. "She Wants You" (Erick Morillo Double Platinum vocal mix) – 6:21
3. "She Wants You" (Cevin Fisher Instinctive club mix) – 8:29
4. "She Wants You" (interactive element) – 3:18

UK cassette single

A1. "She Wants You" (album version) – 3:38
A2. "She Wants You" (The Almighty mix) – 6:46
B1. "So Deep" – 4:53

European and Australasian maxi-CD single

1. "She Wants You" (album version) – 3:38
2. "Last Christmas" – 4:59
3. "She Wants You" (Sharp 'Ballroom' remix) – 8:27

US CD single

1. "She Wants You" – 3:38
2. "She Wants You" (Cibola radio mix) – 3:38
3. "She Wants You" (7-inch disco) – 3:27
4. "Because We Want To" (interactive element) – 3:48

== Credits and personnel ==
Credits are taken from the Honey to the B album booklet.

Studios

- Recorded at Ridge Farm (Surrey, England) and Marcus Studios (London, England)
- Mixed at Metropolis Studios (London, England)

Personnel

- Tim Lawson – writing
- Pam Sheyne – writing
- Billie Piper – vocals
- Wendy Page – backing vocals, production
- Jim Marr – keyboards, programming, production
- Yak Bondy – keyboards, programming
- Pete Craigie – recording, mixing
- Steve Cooper – assistant engineering (Ridge Farm)
- Michelle Barry – assistant engineering (Marcus)
- Matt Tait – assistant engineering (Metropolis)

== Charts ==
=== Weekly charts ===
Chart (1998–1999)	Peak position
Australia (ARIA)	83
Europe (Eurochart Hot 100)	15
Ireland (IRMA)	21
New Zealand (Recorded Music NZ)	4
Scottish Singles Sales (Official Charts)	4
UK Singles (Official Charts)	3
UK Airplay (Music Week)	29
US Bubbling Under Hot 100 (Billboard)	23
US Dance Club Songs (Billboard)	9

=== Year-end charts ===
Chart (1998)	Position
UK Singles (OCC)	97

== Certifications ==
Region	Certification	Certified units/sales
United Kingdom (BPI)	Silver	200,000^{^}
^{^} Shipments figures based on certification alone.

== Release history ==
Region	Date	Format(s)	Label(s)	Ref.
United Kingdom	7 December 1998	CD; cassette	Innocent; Virgin	
United States	13 April 1999	CD	Innocent; Virgin	
United States	27 April 1999	Contemporary hit radio	Innocent; Virgin	
