= Something Deep Inside =

2000 single by Billie Piper

Single by Billie Piper

from the album Walk of Life
- B-side: "First Love"
- Released: 18 September 2000
- Length: 3:21
- Label: Innocent; Virgin
- Songwriters: Billie Piper; Eliot Kennedy; Tim Woodcock
- Producer: Steelworks

Billie Piper singles chronology
"Day & Night" (2000)	"Something Deep Inside" (2000)	"Walk of Life" (2000)

"Something Deep Inside" is a song by English singer turned actress Billie Piper, released as the second single from her second album, Walk of Life (2000), in September 2000. The single debuted and peaked at number four on the UK Singles Chart, becoming her last top-10 single and penultimate hit. It also reached the top 20 in Australia and New Zealand, becoming Piper's last song to chart in both countries.

== Song information ==
The song was remixed (at the beginning of the released version she says 'remix') after it was completed for the single release. The released version was also on her album Walk of Life rather than the original song. The original song can only be found on the Japanese edition of the album.

While on The Friday Night Project in January 2006, Piper was asked by a member of the audience with the name 'Johnny Quiz' if she regretted releasing a single called "Something Deep Inside". To which she responded, while laughing, "Yes, big time!"

== Release and chart performance ==
"Something Deep Inside" was released in the United Kingdom on 18 September 2000. The song debuted on the UK Singles Chart at number four on the week starting 24 September 2000. It remained on the chart for nine weeks, exiting the top 75 on 13 January 2001. The song debuted at number 44 in Ireland and reached its peak of number 33 the next week, then spent two more weeks in the top 50 before dropping out. In Switzerland, the song debuted on the Swiss Hitparade on 22 October 2000 at number 97.

In Australia, "Something Deep Inside" debuted on the ARIA Singles Chart on 1 October 2000 at number 24. Four weeks later, the song peaked at number 20. The track debuted in New Zealand on 8 October 2000 at number 29, her first charting outside of the top 10. It peaked at number 18 three weeks later and remained on the RIANZ Singles Chart for six weeks.

== Music video ==
The video for "Something Deep Inside" was directed by Cameron Casey. A promotional video was also made for the Motiv 8 radio mix.

The video begins in a small, futuristic luxury apartment where Piper wakes up and looks outside, where it is raining. She clickes on a button on the wall and the room is redecorated with digital-like technology. She then invites some friends (who are Piper's dancers) to her house where they have a dance party. They continue to dance and sing the song until the video ends. There were cut scenes of Piper dancing in the main room while it turns into a tropical rainforest. Cut scenes of Piper in the rainforest itself were seen.

== Track listings ==
UK CD1

1. "Something Deep Inside" (radio mix) – 3:21
2. "First Love" – 3:39
3. "Something Deep Inside (Steel & Holliday mix) – 3:16
4. "Something Deep Inside" (video) – 3:20

UK CD2

1. "Something Deep Inside" (radio mix) – 3:21
2. "Something Deep Inside" (G.A.Y mix) – 6:45
3. "Something Deep Inside" (The Bold & The Beautiful mix) – 6:23

UK cassette single

A1. "Something Deep Inside" (radio mix) – 3:21
A2. "Something Deep Inside" (Steve Rodway|Motiv 8 radio mix) – 3:40
B1. "Something Deep Inside" (The Bold & The Beautiful edit) – 3:04
B2. "Something Deep Inside" (Motiv 8 Deep Club vocal mix) – 7:22

European CD single

1. "Something Deep Inside" (radio mix) – 3:21
2. "Something Deep Inside" (The Bold & The Beautiful mix) – 6:23

Australasian CD single

1. "Something Deep Inside" (radio mix) – 3:21
2. "Something Deep Inside" (Motiv 8 Deep Club vocal mix) – 7:22
3. "Something Deep Inside" (The Bold & The Beautiful mix) – 6:23
4. "Something Deep Inside" (Good as You remix) – 6:45
5. "Honey to the Bee" (Hex Hector club mix) – 4:32
6. "Something Deep Inside" (video) – 3:20

== Charts ==
=== Weekly charts ===
Weekly chart performance for "Something Deep Inside"
Chart (2000)	Peak position
Australia (ARIA)	20
Belgium (Ultratip Bubbling Under Flanders)	9
Europe (Eurochart Hot 100)	19
Ireland (IRMA)	33
New Zealand (Recorded Music NZ)	18
Scotland Singles (OCC)	7
Switzerland (Schweizer Hitparade)	97
UK Singles (OCC)	4
UK Airplay (Music Week)	15

=== Year-end charts ===
Year-end chart performance for "Something Deep Inside"
Chart (2000)	Position
UK Singles (OCC)	159
