= Treats (play) =

1975 play by British playwright Christopher Hampton

Treats is a 1975 romantic drama play by Christopher Hampton about a love triangle.

== Plot ==
The play is set in 1974, London, in a single room in Ann's flat. There are three characters: Ann, her former boyfriend Dave, and her lover Patrick.

Ann and Patrick are contentedly sitting at home one night, listening to music and talking, when Dave breaks in. His violent temper is clear from the beginning: He punches Patrick on the nose, then refuses to leave, even as Ann threatens to call the police. It soon turns out that Ann used Dave's work trip to Cyprus to break up with him as she had long planned to do. Now a colleague from work—her new boyfriend, Patrick— has moved in with her. Dave refuses to accept the situation and demands an explanation, bullying Ann, and being overly friendly with Patrick. Ann seems determined not to listen to him, particularly when the two men bond against her. Dave tells her she would be bored out of her mind by Patrick, and asks her to marry him. She refuses. Dave, however, is crafty and clever enough to succeed: he wins her back and moves back in at the end, succeeding in making both of them miserable.

== Background ==
The play grew out of Hampton's translation of Ibsen's A Doll's House. He noted, however, that in the 1970s there were probably as many women trapped in unsatisfactory relationships with abusive men as in the 1870s, and that Ibsen's play was no longer provocative enough. Treats was an instant box office success at the Royal Court and in the West End.

The play had its Boston premiere in April 1982. In The Boston Phoenix, Alan Stern wrote that the play "seems a little like Kramer vs. Kramer with Apocalypse Now going on in the background. The end may be near, but people still play the same games of coupling and uncoupling. Only now they seem more desperate, and nobody talks about living happily ever after — or even, for that matter, for a few minutes."

In March 2007, it was revived in London in an updated version, at the Garrick Theatre with a cast including Billie Piper, her real-life husband Laurence Fox, and Kris Marshall. In his review of the new production, Michael Billington thought the credibility of Ann being "forced to choose between an amiable wimp and a destructive neurotic" even less credible than he had in the era of Women's lib in 1976.

== See also ==
- Design for Living by Noël Coward
- Black by Joyce Carol Oates
- Candida by George Bernard Shaw
- Look Back in Anger by John Osborne
- Betrayal by Harold Pinter
- The Real Thing by Tom Stoppard
