= Walk of Life (Billie Piper song) =

2000 single by Billie Piper

Single by Billie Piper

from the album Walk of Life
- B-side: "Caress the Gold"
- Released: 11 December 2000
- Length: 3:49
- Label: Innocent; Virgin
- Songwriters: Wendy Page; Billie Piper
- Producers: Jim Marr; Wendy Page; Quiz & Larossi

Billie Piper singles chronology
"Something Deep Inside" (2000)	"Walk of Life" (2000)

"Walk of Life" is a song by English singer Billie Piper, written by Piper and Wendy Page for Piper's second studio album, Walk of Life (2000). It was released as her final single in December 2000 following her decision to retire from the music industry. It was her first single to miss the top five in the United Kingdom, stalling at number 25 on the UK Singles Chart. The song's music video was directed by Jamie Morgan.

== Critical reception ==
The song received mixed reviews from music critics. Yahoo! reviewer Jackie Flynn wrote that she had heard the song "a hundred times before" and compared it to "Mama" by Kim Appleby. Peter Robinson of NME wrote that "Walk of Life" "sounds nice", but "lacks the excitement" of previous singles.

== Release and chart performance ==
"Walk of Life" was released in the United Kingdom on 11 December 2000 as a CD and cassette single. The song debuted on the UK Singles Chart on 23 December 2000 at number 25, its peak. It remained on the chart for five weeks and became the lowest-charting single of Piper's career despite heavy promotion. In Switzerland, the song debuted at number 66 on the Swiss Singles Chart on 4 February 2001. It failed to chart in Australia and New Zealand despite the previous single, "Something Deep Inside", reaching the top 20.

== Track listings ==
UK CD1

1. "Walk of Life" – 3:49
2. "Caress the Gold" – 4:56
3. "Walk of Life" (Whirlwind mix) – 3:20
4. "Walk of Life" (video) – 3:49

UK CD2

1. "Walk of Life" – 3:49
2. "Walk of Life" (Twister radio mix) – 4:16
3. "Walk of Life" (Lottie's Midnight mix) – 7:18

UK cassette single

1. "Walk of Life" – 3:49
2. "Walk of Life" (Whirlwind mix) – 3:20

European CD single

1. "Walk of Life" – 3:49
2. "Caress the Gold" – 4:56

== Charts ==
Chart (2000–2001)	Peak position
Europe (Eurochart Hot 100)	96
Scotland Singles (OCC)	30
Switzerland (Schweizer Hitparade)	66
UK Singles (OCC)	25
UK Airplay (Music Week)	20
