= Walk of Life (album) =

Studio album by Billie Piper
- Released: 12 July 2000
- Genre: Pop; dance-pop
- Length: 41:04
- Label: Innocent; Virgin
- Producer: Steve Jervier; Later Inc.; Jim Marr; Rick Mitra; Wendy Page; Quiet Money; Quiz & Larossi; Ray Ruffin; Guy Roche; Steelworks; Lawrence Johnson (vocal); Pete Craigie (addl.); StarGate (addl.)

Billie Piper chronology
Honey to the B (1998)	Walk of Life (2000)	The Best of Billie (2005)

Singles from Walk of Life
- 1. "Day & Night" Released: 15 May 2000; 2. "Something Deep Inside" Released: 18 September 2000; 3. "Walk of Life" Released: 11 December 2000

Alternative cover
- Japanese cover

Professional ratings
Review scores
Source	Rating
MTV Asia	8/10 stars
Yahoo!	4/10 stars

Walk of Life is the second and final studio album by the English pop singer Billie Piper, released in July 2000. Piper's second album (her first released under her full name) produced three Top 30 singles in the UK – "Day & Night" (number 1), "Something Deep Inside" (number 4), and "Walk of Life" (number 25). The album itself reached number 14, the same position as her debut, but only reaching a Silver certification.

== Background ==
The album was originally released in Japan in July 2000. Its release in other markets was delayed until October 2000. The releases differ in album art and track listing. The October 2000 release includes remixed versions of "Something Deep Inside" and "Walk of Life". The album was not released in the US.

A new mix of "Makin' My Way" (originally featured on the Pokémon: The First Movie soundtrack) was released on the Japanese version of the album. This and "First Love" were both replaced on international releases with "Bring It On" and "What Game Is This?". "First Love" was later used as the B-side to some releases of "Something Deep Inside".

"The Tide Is High", a cover of a song performed by The Paragons later covered by Blondie, was to be the fourth single from the album. Piper states in her book Growing Pains that she told Virgin Records not to bother releasing "The Tide Is High" as a single because she was worn out after appearing in court against a woman named Juliet Peters who had given Piper, her friends, and her family numerous death threats. A single mix and remixes were commissioned but never released.

== Track listing ==
International edition
No.	Title	Writer(s)	Producer(s)	Length
1.	"Day & Night"	Mark Cawley; Eliot Kennedy; Tim Lever; Mike Percy; Billie Piper	Steelworks; StarGate^{[a]}	3:15
2.	"Something Deep Inside" (radio mix)	Kennedy; Piper; Tim Woodcock	Steelworks; Quiet Money^{[a]}	3:21
3.	"Walk of Life"	Wendy Page; Piper	Jim Marr^{[b]}; Page^{[b]}; Quiz & Larossi	3:49
4.	"Safe with Me"	Marr; Page	Marr^{[b]}; Page^{[b]}; Quiz & Larossi	3:32
5.	"Bring It On"	Andreas Avellan; Patrick Berger; Kara DioGuardi	Quiet Money	3:29
6.	"Ring My Bell"	Lasse Anderson; Peter Hallström; Nicci Notini	Later Inc.	3:15
7.	"The Tide Is High"	Howard Barrett; Tyrone Evans; John Holt	Ray Ruffin	3:07
8.	"Run That by Me"	Lucas; Marr; Page	Marr; Page; Pete Craigie^{[c]}	4:01
9.	"Promises"	Rick Mitra; Piper; Pam Sheyne	Mitra	3:32
10.	"Because of You"	Kennedy; Lever; Percy; Piper	Steelworks	3:37
11.	"What Game Is This?"	Marr; Page	Steve Jervier; Craigie^{[c]}; Lawrence Johnson^{[d]}	3:33
12.	"Misfocusing"	Lucas; Marr; Page	Marr; Page; Craigie^{[c]}	4:03

Japanese edition
No.	Title	Writer(s)	Producer(s)	Length
1.	"Day & Night"	Cawley; Kennedy; Lever; Percy; Piper	Steelworks; StarGate^{[a]}	3:15
2.	"Something Deep Inside" (original version)	Kennedy; Piper; Woodcock	Steelworks	3:43
3.	"Walk of Life"	Page; Piper	Marr; Page	3:49
4.	"Makin' My Way"	Diane Warren	Guy Roche	4:25
5.	"Safe with Me"	Marr; Page	Marr^{[b]}; Page^{[b]}; Quiz & Larossi	3:32
6.	"Ring My Bell"	Anderson; Hallström; Notini	Later Inc.	3:15
7.	"The Tide Is High"	Barrett; Evans; Holt	Ray Ruffin	3:07
8.	"Run That by Me"	Lucas; Marr; Page	Marr; Page; Craigie^{[c]}	4:01
9.	"Promises"	Mitra; Piper; Sheyne	Mitra	3:32
10.	"Because of You"	Kennedy; Lever; Percy; Piper	Steelworks	3:37
11.	"First Love"	David Frank; Steve Kipner; Sheyne	Marr; Page	3:39
12.	"Misfocusing"	Lucas; Marr; Page	Marr; Page; Craigie^{[c]}	4:03

Notes

- ^{^[a]} signifies a remixer.
- ^{^[b]} signifies an original producer and remixer.
- ^{^[c]} signifies an additional producer.
- ^{^[d} signifies a vocal producer.

== Personnel ==
- Billie Piper – vocals
- Eliot Kennedy – producer
- Tim Lever – producer, writer, musician
- Jim Marr – producer, mixing, programming, keyboards, guitar, bass guitar
- Wendy Page – producer, mixing, backing vocals, vocal arrangement
- Alexander Guardian – backing vocals

== Charts ==
Chart performance for Walk of Life
Chart (2000)	Peak position
Australian Albums (ARIA)	23
Irish Albums (IRMA)	65
New Zealand Albums (RMNZ)	17
Scottish Albums (OCC)	21
UK Albums (OCC)	14

== Release history ==
Country	Date	Format(s)	Label	Ref.
Japan	12 July 2000	CD	EMI Japan	
United Kingdom	2 October 2000	Cassette; CD; minidisc	Innocent	
