= Yerma =

Play by Federico García Lorca

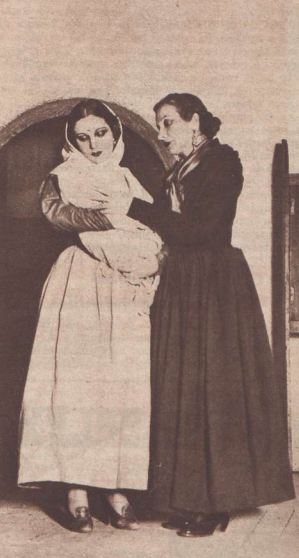
- Margarita Xirgu and Pilar Muñoz in a scene of the play.
- Written by: Federico García Lorca
- Characters: Yerma; Juan; Victor; Maria; Dolores; Two Sisters-in-law; Pagan Old Woman; Male; Female; Boy; Shepherd; Child; Six Washerwomen; Two Girls; Two Women; Two Old Women; Three Men; Seven Young Girls; Children
- Genre: Tragedy

Premiere
- Date premiered: 1934

Yerma [ˈɟʝeɾma] is a play by the Spanish dramatist Federico García Lorca. It was written in 1934 and first performed that same year. García Lorca describes the play as "a tragic poem." The play tells the story of a childless woman living in rural Spain. Her desperate desire for motherhood becomes an obsession that eventually drives her to commit a horrific crime.

== Plot ==
- Act 1, scene 1:

Yerma has been married two years. She wants to strengthen her husband, Juan, so he can give her children. Telling Yerma to stay at home, Juan goes back to his work in the olive groves, and Yerma talks and sings to the child she wishes she were carrying. Yerma fears that if she doesn't conceive soon, her blood will turn to poison. María, married five months and already pregnant, asks Yerma to sew for the baby. The couple's friend, Víctor, sees Yerma sewing and assumes she is pregnant. His advice when he learns the truth: Try harder.

- Act 1, scene 2:

Yerma has just taken Juan his dinner in the fields. On the road home, she encounters an old woman who insists that passion is the key to conception. Yerma admits a secret longing for Víctor but none for Juan. She then meets two girls whose attitudes astonish her. One has left her baby untended. The other is childless and glad of it, although her mother, Dolores, is giving her herbs for pregnancy. Next Víctor comes along, and the conversation between Víctor and Yerma becomes tense with unspoken thoughts and desires. Juan enters, worrying about what people will say if Yerma stays out chatting. He tells her he intends to work all night. Yerma will sleep alone.

- Act 2, scene 1:

It is three years later. Five laundresses gossip about a woman who still has no children, who has been looking at another man, and whose husband has brought in his sisters to keep an eye on her. We know they mean Yerma. The laundresses sing about husbands, sex, and babies.

- Act 2, scene 2:

Juan's two sisters watch over Yerma . She refuses to stay at home, and people are talking. Without children in it, her house seems like a prison to her. Her marriage has turned bitter. María visits, but reluctantly since the sight of her baby always makes Yerma weep. The childless girl says her mother, Dolores, is expecting Yerma. Víctor comes in to say goodbye. Yerma is surprised and a little saddened by Víctor's announcement to go. When she asks him why he must go he answers along the lines of “things change.” Juan enters and it is later found out that Juan has bought Víctor's sheep. It would seem that Juan is one of the reasons why Víctor is leaving. Yerma is angered, and when Juan goes out with Víctor, Yerma makes her escape to see Dolores.

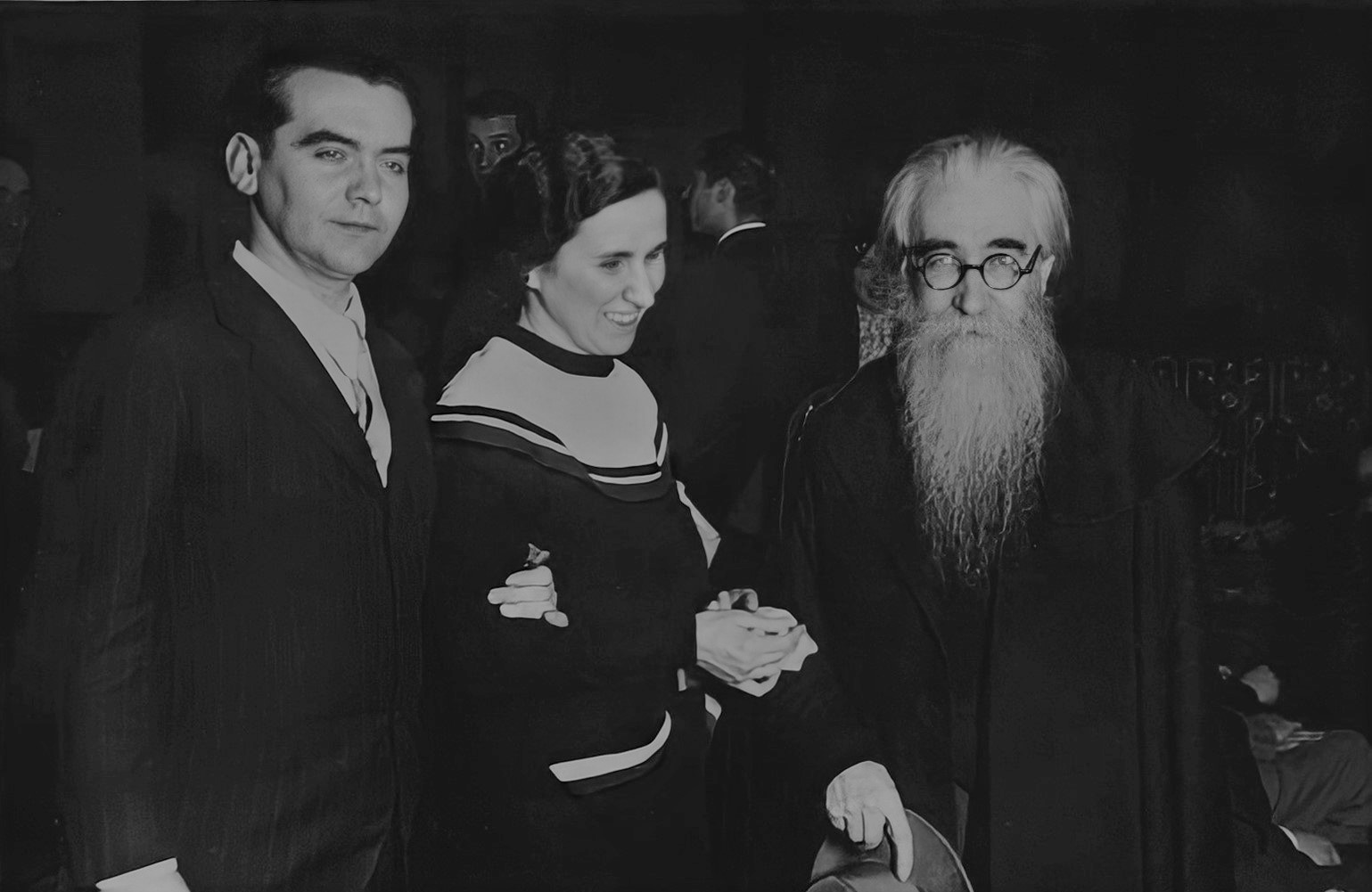
Lorca, Pura Maórtua and Valle-Inclán, Madrid, 1934.

- Act 3, scene 1:

Yerma is found at Dolores's house. Dolores and the old woman have been praying over Yerma all night in the cemetery. Juan accuses Yerma of deceit, and she curses her blood, her body, and her father "who gave me his blood, enough for a hundred children."

- Act 3, scene 2:

The scene begins near a hermitage high in the mountains, a place to which many barren women, including Yerma, have made a pilgrimage. Young men are there, hoping to father a child or to win a woman away from her husband. The old woman tells Yerma to leave Juan and take up with her son, who is "made of blood," but Yerma holds to her sense of honor and dismisses that thought. Juan overhears and tells Yerma to give up wanting a child, to be content with what she has. Realizing that Juan never did and never will want a child, Yerma strangles him, thus killing her only hope of ever bearing a child. The play ends with Yerma saying, "Don’t come near me, because I’ve killed my child. I’ve killed my child with my own hands!"

== Characters ==
- Yerma: a young woman whose desire for a child is so strong that she speaks and sings to the not-yet-created baby. Because her marriage seems to be without love, she believes a child will bring her the joy she so desperately seeks. She feels empty and unfulfilled without a child, but is not able to achieve success with her distant husband Juan. However unhappy she may be in her marriage, she refuses to leave him because of her overwhelming sense of honor and duty. Her name is the feminine version of the adjective yermo, meaning "barren."
- Juan: Yerma's husband. He does not believe in the child that could be but only in what can be seen and touched. His job is to till the land and help the earth grow, but his wife, whose name means barren land, is left without a child. He is very self-conscious about what others think.
- Víctor: an old friend of Yerma and Juan. He is a fellow worker of the land. He appears a few times within the play, usually with only Yerma. There may have been something in the past between the two of them, but he was not chosen by her father.
- María: Yerma's newly married friend. She is having a baby, and Yerma is saddened by this fact.
- Dolores: a woman said to have the powers to help a barren woman get pregnant.
- Two sisters-in-law (Las Cuñadas): Juan's sisters who are called on in the second act to watch over Yerma.
- Old woman (La Vieja): the voice of reason for Yerma in acts one and two. She is first seen on Yerma's walk to bring Juan food. The old woman gives Yerma advice on how to keep a man and what a woman must do. She has been married twice and has had fourteen children in total. In act three she mentions to Yerma that she has a very available son and that he would be able to give her children.
- Six washerwomen: the voice of the town. They represent the various thoughts of the citizens. Some blame Yerma for her lack of children, some are indifferent, others speak up for Yerma.

== Themes ==
Yerma deals with the themes of isolation, passion, and frustration but also the underlying themes of nature, marriage, jealousy, and friendship. Social conventions of the period also play a large part in the play's plot. The character Yerma, the name meaning barren, is a younger woman with no children. She marries Juan out of honor and duty to her father. She is surrounded by a society that feels that women have a duty to their husband to provide them with heirs. Most of the town's people blame Yerma for her inability to conceive. There also seems to be no love within this marriage, and at times she considers that the reason why she cannot have children. It is hinted in the play that she may have feelings for another man, but she refuses to express these feelings because of a strong sense of duty to her husband. Even when the old woman tells her that she has a very fertile son that she can go off with, Yerma refuses by replying, "What about my honour? . . . Did you really think that I could go with another man? That I’d go and beg him for what’s already mine?" There are also overflowing themes of power and struggle. Throughout the play it would seem that Yerma had little or no power in her situation. She had no baby but without the consent of her husband, she has no other options. Her struggle is between her duty to her husband and her inner want of a child. She wants a child not only because she longs for one but also because during the time that she lives that's all a woman could hope for. Unlike a man, who has the land and his work, a woman has nothing but the care of a child to get her through the day, and she lives day by day without that. Her inner struggle is too great toward the end, and she commands power as she strangles Juan to his death. She has finally stood up for what she wanted and at the same time killed her only chances.

== Pagan influence ==
“Yerma” has many Christian morals such as marrying for the main reason to procreate and not going outside of the marriage to fix any problems. García Lorca uses the strict rules of the Christian religion to depict Yerma as one not able to act upon natural human drives. As Robert Lima details in his article "Toward the Dionysiac: Pagan Elements and Rites in Yerma," García Lorca writes of the naturalness of the pagan ways throughout the play, using as vehicles characters such as the old woman, events such as the pilgrimage, and the four Empedoclean or "classical" elements, all providing contrast against Christian morals and their operation and effects. The four elements (earth, water, fire, and wind) are noted in the play both directly and indirectly. The elements have been known to represent the four seasons of the year, the four “humors” that represent human temperament, and the four points of the compass. Usually when the elements appear they constitute the foundation of all that exists. García Lorca uses the elements to create a symbolic pattern ironic in that it is Yerma who often refers to the pagan elements yet cannot assimilate them.

Earth is first noted in Yerma's offstage lullaby at the beginning of the play when she sings she will make a hut in the field to shelter the child, with the field representing the element Earth. Earth is the element that is representative of mothering and nurturing. This element is the most instinctive in Yerma. In the play she tells of the times when she goes outdoors just to feel her bare feet on the ground. She senses that she must have physical contact with the soil which identifies her with Earth. Juan is also associated with the Earth because of his job in the fields. His life is in the fields, and he is able to fertilize all the soil except that of Yerma. What Yerma does not realize is that to get Juan to want her, she must yield to him as the Earth would do and let go of her fantasy if she has any hope to have a child.

The next element, water, is the one that Juan lacks the most. He only has a limited supply of water to irrigate the fields; all that water must go to the land, which means Yerma has no water to quench her thirst. She indistinctly notices that Juan is lacking water and tells him that she would like him to go to the river and swim or go to the roof when the rain drenches the roof. Her mentioning water in two different situations alludes to the fact that she wants Juan to have more water within himself. The symbol of immersion in water can sometimes imply “rebirth.” In contrast, the other male character, Víctor, has a more positive relation to water. There is one instance where Yerma hears Víctor singing offstage and tells him how well he sings and how it sounds like a torrent of water filling his mouth. Her association with him and water reinforce what the old woman said about children rushing to water. Yerma, however, is too late for the very plentiful water of Víctor. The next instance of water is the “cold brook” where the washerwomen gather. This represents Yerma's inability to get pregnant and Juan's coldness to the idea. Both the elements Earth and water are feminine elements, but they cannot be complete without the masculine elements air and fire.

Air is seen as male because of the association with “the breath of life” and dynamics of storms and winds. In conjunction with that, air is the medium in which movement occurs and is also the element that surrounds everything in nature. This is suggestive of the male's sexual embrace of a woman. Air is featured many times throughout the play. It is mentioned when Yerma speaks of the wind singing in the trees and when she raises her arms and yawns, which is significant of the deep ritualistic inhalation of the air that made the Earth fertile. Since Yerma cannot be like the Earth and yield or be passive, she must be active in the manifestation of her sexuality. This is what the old woman tried to tell Yerma, and because the old woman is as free as air, she has had two husbands and given birth to fourteen children. Air is also a subject of interest when Juan berates Yerma for her obsession "with things that drift in the air." Juan, again, does not exhibit the masculine nature that Yerma desperately hopes for. Víctor, however, embodies the masculine element. In one instance, Yerma goes to the spot where he last stood and takes a deep breath to inhale natural virility. She realizes that he has always had the potential to fill her fully, but alas she is too late and out of honor chooses to stay with Juan.

Lastly there is fire, the other male element that carries with it varied meanings. In some traditions, it functioned as purgation, transmutation, and regeneration. Fire also has a traditional association with well-being or ill-health. In Celtic Europe fire was used in major rituals in which bonfires and torches were used to promote fertility of the fields, animals, and humans. One sense of the element fire in Yerma is that of passion, or lack thereof. Yerma mentions how Juan's face lacks the color of life and how his pale skin has not been touched by the fire of the sun's rays. In contrast, Víctor's passionate nature is evident in his life and inner fire. It is toward the end where we see fire start to be represented indirectly with Yerma. She tells Juan how unfair it is for her to be consumed, making reference to fire and being a victim. Wanting to cease being a victim, she goes off to change things for herself. In the end, Juan's lack of passion has fueled her flaming desire to have a child even more. The fact that she goes to the hermitage, where woman walk barefoot on the soil, makes reference to her initial association with the earth. Finally, with Juan stating that he will never want children, Yerma is taken over by her passion. Juan is consumed by her fiery frustration and is finally killed.

== Legacy ==
Ian Gibson suggests that Yerma is the work of García Lorca's most directly associated with his assassination in the early days of the Spanish Civil War. It most openly challenges the institution of Catholicism and the strict sexual morality of contemporary Spanish society.

- Paul Bowles composed an opera based on Yerma in 1955.
- Heitor Villa-Lobos composed an opera based on the play; it was premiered in 1971.
- In 2001 Pilar Távora directed a version in Spanish (Yerma), starring Aitana Sánchez-Gijón.
- The play In the Red and Brown Water by Tarell Alvin McCraney, written circa 2007, is a loose adaptation of Yerma set in a housing project in Louisiana.

=== 2016 revival ===
In 2016, Australian playwright Simon Stone premiered an adaptation at the London's Young Vic, starring Billie Piper. The play was an enormous success receiving rave reviews, namely for Piper's "earth-quaking" performance. The play went on to become one of the most acclaimed and awarded of the decade, with Piper winning all six available Best Actress London theatre awards, including the coveted Laurence Olivier Award, fending off competition from Glenda Jackson. The play saw an unparalleled number of five-star reviews with Piper being described as "dangerously draining", "searing, stunning and unmissable". It also won the 2017 Laurence Olivier Award for Best Revival. It played a second run from July to August 2017 with two live broadcasts to cinemas in the UK on 31 August and international cinemas on 21 September. Encore performances were later added after demand surged.

In October 2017, it was announced that Piper would transfer with the show to New York City stage in 2018. The play was a sold out hit playing for six weeks at the Park Avenue Armory in New York City and was hailed by US critics. The New York Times said Piper's performance was "an unconditional victory" and "blisteringly powerful" awarding it five stars, whilst The Hollywood Reporter found her "simply staggering" adding; "When the actress appears at the curtain call, looking emotionally and physical exhausted, you find yourself relieved that she's OK and concerned that she'll have to do it all over again the next night." Time Out likened Piper to an "angry beast" warning that her "astonishing" performance inflicted psychological-like emotions on the audience. NBC's Katie Englehart said "Piper is so devastating I almost vomited in my seat - that doesn't sound like an endorsement but it is." Vogue hailed Piper as "one of the great talents of her generation" and described her performance as "astonishing, raw, feral and terrifying." The AM New York critic claimed to be left "gasping for air" whilst the New York Stage Review found Piper's "downward spiral into abyss utterly harrowing and blazingly remarkable."

== Bibliography ==
- Edwards, Gwynne. Lorca Living in the Theatre. London: Peter Owen Publishers, 2003.
- Lima, Robert. "Toward the Dionysiac: Pagan Elements and Rites in Yerma." Journal of Dramatic Theory and Criticism 4.2 (1990): 63–82.
- García Lorca, Federico. Blood Wedding and Yerma. New York : Theatre Communications Group Inc, 1994.
- Smith, Paul Julian. The Theatre of Garcia Lorca. New York: Cambridge UP, 1998.
