= Growing Pains (book) =

Autobiography by Billie Piper

- Front Cover
- Author: Billie Piper
- Language: English
- Genre: Autobiography
- Publisher: Hodder & Stoughton
- Publication date: October 19, 2006 Original Release; August 9, 2007; Re-issue
- Publication place: United Kingdom
- Media type: Print (Hardback)
- ISBN: 9780340938492

Growing Pains is the title of Billie Piper's autobiography, released 19 October 2006 by Hodder & Stoughton.

Piper signed a six-figure contract with publishers Hodder & Stoughton to write her autobiography Growing Pains, which was released in the autumn of 2006. Apparently (according to a Top Gear interview), Piper only released the autobiography due to an unauthorised biography coming out.

The Re-issue cover

In the book, Piper divulges about her battle with anorexia that developed after a television presenter called her fat when she was a 16-year-old pop star. Piper began to use laxatives as well as starvation to drop weight. During a US promotional tour, she contemplated suicide as a result of low record sales and self-doubt. She admits to managing five days without food during which time she existed on nothing more than Diet Coke and coffee. She also stated that her relationship with Chris Evans made her ditch her starvation diet and gave her a new zest for life. However, after her split with Evans, Piper returned to anorexia. In the autobiography, Piper said that eating disorders were rife among the girls at her former school, the Sylvia Young Theatre School. Young has since spoken out against Piper calling her claim "rubbish" and stating she feels "bewildered" by the allegation.

In recent publication, a re-issue of her autobiography has been printed. The re-issue features critics' reviews on the back, a completely different cover and an extension chapter. There are 4 special photo sections in the book.
