= Honey to the B =

Studio album by Billie
- Released: 19 October 1998
- Recorded: 1998
- Studio: Ridge Farm (Rusper, England)
- Genre: Pop; R&B
- Length: 51:04
- Label: Innocent; Virgin
- Producer: Wendy Page; Jim Marr

Billie chronology
Honey to the B (1998)	Walk of Life (2000)

Singles from Honey to the B
- 1. "Because We Want To" Released: 29 June 1998; 2. "Girlfriend" Released: 5 October 1998; 3. "She Wants You" Released: 7 December 1998; 4. "Honey to the Bee" Released: 22 March 1999

Professional ratings
Review scores
Source	Rating
AllMusic	3/5 stars
Yahoo!	(positive)

Honey to the B is the debut album by the English pop singer Billie Piper, released in 1998. Known mononymously as Billie until her second album, she was the first and youngest British female artist to have a first single enter the UK singles chart at number one.

A number of hit singles were released from the album, including "Girlfriend", "She Wants You", the anthemic "Because We Want To", and the title track "Honey to the Bee". "Honey to the Bee" was later covered by the Swedish girl group Play on their 2003 album Replay. The American version of the album differs in that it contains the radio mix of "Girlfriend" and a re-arranged track order. The single "Honey to the Bee" re-entered the official UK singles chart at number 17 on 21 January 2007, eight years after initial release, thanks to efforts by the BBC Radio 1 DJ Chris Moyles.

The album has sold 380,000 copies in the UK as of July 2013.

== Track listing ==
International edition
No.	Title	Writer(s)	Length
1.	"Because We Want To"	Jim Marr; Wendy Page; Dion Rambo; Jacques Richmond	3:48
2.	"Girlfriend"	Rambo; Richmond	3:50
3.	"Officially Yours"	Rick Mitra	3:26
4.	"She Wants You"	Tim Laws; Pam Sheyne	3:38
5.	"Love Groove"	Marr; Page; Billie Piper	4:29
6.	"Party on the Phone"	Marr; Page	4:14
7.	"Saying I'm Sorry Now"	Rambo; Richmond	4:00
8.	"You've Got It"	Ian Green; John McLaughlin	3:43
9.	"I Dream"	Marr; Page	5:33
10.	"Honey to the Bee"	Marr; Page	5:03
11.	"Whatcha Gonna Do"	Rambo; Richmond	4:33
12.	"Don't Forget to Remember"	Marr; Page	4:47

Japanese bonus tracks
No.	Title	Writer(s)	Length
13.	"So Deep"	Marr; Page	4:54
14.	"She Wants You" (The Almighty Mix)	Laws; Sheyne	6:47

US edition
No.	Title	Writer(s)	Length
1.	"Honey to the Bee"	Marr; Page	5:01
2.	"I Dream"	Marr; Page	5:34
3.	"She Wants You"	Laws; Sheyne	3:40
4.	"Love Groove"	Marr; Page; Piper	4:28
5.	"Party on the Phone"	Marr; Page	4:13
6.	"Officially Yours"	Mitra	3:29
7.	"You've Got It"	Green; McLaughlin	3:43
8.	"Saying I'm Sorry Now"	Rambo; Richmond	4:11
9.	"Girlfriend" (radio mix)	Rambo; Richmond	3:56
10.	"Whatcha Gonna Do"	Rambo; Richmond	4:34
11.	"Don't Forget to Remember"	Marr; Page	4:48
12.	"Because We Want To"	Marr; Page; Rambo; Richmond	3:50

== Personnel ==
- Billie Piper – vocals
- Jim Marr – producer, mixing, programming, keyboards, guitar, bass guitar
- Wendy Page – producer, mixing, backing vocals, vocal arrangement
- Cutfather – producer, remixing
- Yak Bondy – backing vocals, keyboards, piano, vocoder, programming
- Roger Jackson – guitar, keyboards, programming
- Mark James – acoustic guitar
- Nick Lacey – flute, strings
- London Community Gospel Choir – backing vocals
- Sweet-P – vocals
- Pete Craigie – engineer, mixing
- Michelle Barry – assistant engineer
- Matt Tait – assistant engineer

== Charts ==
=== Weekly charts ===
Chart (1998–99)	Peak position
Australian Albums (ARIA)	31
Japanese Albums (Oricon)	46
New Zealand Albums (RMNZ)	3
Scottish Albums (OCC)	23
Swedish Albums (Sverigetopplistan)	56
UK Albums (OCC)	14
US Heatseekers Albums (Billboard)	17

=== Year-end charts ===
Chart (1998)	Position
UK Albums (OCC)	42
Chart (1999)	Position
New Zealand Albums (RIANZ)	26

== Certifications ==
Region	Certification	Certified units/sales
United Kingdom (BPI)	Platinum	300,000^{^}
^{^} Shipments figures based on certification alone.

== Release history ==
Release dates and formats for Honey to the B
Country	Date	Format(s)	Label	Ref.
United Kingdom	19 October 1998	Cassette; CD; minidisc	Innocent; Virgin	
Japan	20 January 1999	CD	Virgin	
United States	18 May 1999	CD	Innocent; Virgin	
