= Rare Beasts =

2019 drama film

- Directed by: Billie Piper
- Written by: Billie Piper
- Produced by: Vaughan Sivell
- Starring: Billie Piper; Leo Bill; Lily James; David Thewlis; Kerry Fox; Toby Woolf
- Cinematography: Patrick Meller
- Edited by: Hazel Baillie
- Music by: Johnny Lloyd; Nathan Coen
- Production companies: Western Edge Pictures; Moffen Media Limited
- Release dates: 31 August 2019 (Venice); 21 May 2021 (United Kingdom)
- Country: United Kingdom
- Language: English
- Box office: $63,828

Rare Beasts is a 2019 British psychological romantic drama film written and directed by Billie Piper in her directorial debut. It stars Piper, Lily James, David Thewlis, Leo Bill, Kerry Fox and Toby Woolf.

Rare Beasts premiered at the Venice Film Festival on 31 August 2019, later receiving a simultaneous release in cinemas and digitally on 21 May 2021 in the UK.

== Plot ==
Mandy is a single mother, living with her mother and son Larch, who suffers from behavioural disorders. She reluctantly agrees to a date with her co-worker Pete, despite his patriarchal beliefs.

Despite Pete's belittlement, Mandy continues to date him, believing his presence has a positive impact on Larch and herself. The trio attend the wedding of Pete's sister, being introduced to his deeply Christian family. At the wedding, the pair berate one-another, before getting into a physical fight.

Mandy visits her estranged father, who reminisces about her childhood, and reveals that her mother is dying. Mandy reunites with Pete and proposes to him, whilst her parents rekindle their relationship.

Mandy violently quits her job after pitching a nihilistic advertisement. Pete, unnerved by the prospect of marrying Mandy, unsuccessfully attempts to cheat, before the two reconcile and make love.

In a dreamlike-sequence, Mandy tap-dances in front of her extended family, before sitting alongside her mother during her final moments. Following her death, and surrounded by a crowd of onlooking women, Mandy breaks up with Pete and skips into the distance with Larch.

== Cast ==
- Billie Piper as Mandy
- Leo Bill as Pete
- David Thewlis as Vic
- Lily James as Cressida
- Kerry Fox as Marion
- Toby Woolf as Larch
- Jonjo O'Neill as Dougie
- Antonia Campbell-Hughes as Cathy
- Montserrat Lombard as Val
- Mariah Gale as Vanessa
- Michael Elwyn as Bertie

== Production ==
In May 2018, it was announced Billie Piper would write, direct, and star in the film. In September 2018, it was announced that principal photography had commenced, with David Thewlis, Leo Bill and Kerry Fox joining the cast of the film. Filming took place in London, as well as Lloret de Mar, Catalonia, Spain.

== Release ==
Rare Beasts had its world premiere at the Venice Film Festival on 31 August 2019. The film later screened at the London Film Festival and the Kerry Film Festival, both in October 2019. The film's North American premiere was scheduled to take place at South by Southwest in March 2020, however, the festival was cancelled as a result of the COVID-19 pandemic.

In February 2021, the film's first official trailer was released and distributor Republic Film Distribution earmarked its UK theatrical release for 7 May 2021. The film's release date was later revised to 21 May 2021, as government lockdown restrictions on indoor cinemas were lifted from 17 May in England, Scotland and Wales. The film received a limited release in 30 cinemas across the UK and was simultaneously made available to purchase and stream on Amazon Prime Video and the Google Play Store.

== Reception ==
Of the 51 reviews collected by review aggregator Rotten Tomatoes, 71% were reported as being positive with an average rating of 6.1/10. The critics consensus reads: "Billie Piper's admirably bold directorial vision isn't quite enough to counter Rare Beasts' frustratingly shallow treatment of its weightier themes."

=== Accolades ===
Year	Award	Category	Recipient	Result	Ref.
2020	Göteborg Film Festival Awards	Ingmar Bergman International Debut Award	Rare Beasts	Nominated	
2020	SXSW Film Festival Awards	Adam Yauch Hörnblowér Award	Rare Beasts	Nominated	
2022	National Film Awards	Best Actress	Billie Piper	Nominated	
2022	National Film Awards	Outstanding Performance	Billie Piper	Nominated	
2022	National Film Awards	Best Director	Billie Piper	Nominated	
