= Honey to the Bee =

1999 single by Billie Piper

Single by Billie

from the album Honey to the B
- B-side: "Call Me"; "What's Missing"
- Released: 22 March 1999
- Studio: Ridge Farm (Surrey, England); Marcus (London, England)
- Length: 5:04 (album version); 3:39 (radio edit)
- Label: Innocent; Virgin
- Songwriters: Wendy Page; Jim Marr
- Producers: Jim Marr; Wendy Page

Billie singles chronology
"She Wants You" (1998)	"Honey to the Bee" (1999)	"Thank ABBA for the Music" (1999)

Music video
- "Honey to the Bee" on YouTube

"Honey to the Bee" is a song by English singer Billie from her debut studio album, Honey to the B (1998). It was released on 22 March 1999 and debuted at number three on the UK Singles Chart, which became its peak position. It was not a hit in mainland Europe, but it became one of Billie's highest-charting songs in Australia and New Zealand, reaching number six in the former country and number five in the latter. In Australia, it was the 48th-best-selling song of 1999.

In January 2007, the UK Official Charts Company lifted all restrictions for singles charting on digital sales, allowing songs to appear on the UK chart even if they had not been released physically. In an attempt to exploit the new rules, BBC Radio 1 DJ Chris Moyles randomly selected "Honey to the Bee" and began to champion it. As a result, the song reappeared at number 17 on the UK Singles Chart on the week of 21 January, registering a sale of 6,500 downloads.

== Music video ==
The video, which uses the shorter radio edit version in lieu of the full album version, was directed by Katie Bell and features Billie in a computer-animated background, also known as computer-generated imagery.

== Track listings ==
UK CD1

1. "Honey to the Bee" (radio edit) – 3:39
2. "Call Me" – 3:58
3. "What's Missing" – 3:46

UK CD2 and Australian CD single

1. "Honey to the Bee" (radio edit) – 3:39
2. "Honey to the Bee" (acoustic version) – 4:24
3. "Honey to the Bee" (Delakota mix) – 5:00
4. "Honey to the Bee" (video)

UK cassette single

A1. "Honey to the Bee" (radio edit) – 3:39
A2. "She Wants You" (7-inch disco) – 3:29
B1. Interview – 10:05

European CD single

1. "Honey to the Bee" (radio edit) – 3:39
2. "Call Me" – 3:58

== Credits and personnel ==
Credits are lifted from the Honey to the B album booklet.

Studios

- Recorded at Ridge Farm (Surrey, England) and Marcus Studios (London, England)
- Mixed at Metropolis Studios (London, England)

Personnel

- Wendy Page – writing, backing vocals, vocal arrangement, production
- Jim Marr – writing, guitar, keyboards, programming, production
- Billie Piper – vocals
- London Community Gospel Choir – choral backing vocals
- Reverend Bazil Meade – choir arrangement
- Pete Craigie – recording, mixing
- Steve Cooper – assistant engineering (Ridge Farm)
- Michelle Barry – assistant engineering (Marcus)
- Matt Tait – assistant engineering (Metropolis)

== Charts ==
=== Weekly charts ===
Chart (1999)	Peak position
Australia (ARIA)	6
Europe (Eurochart Hot 100)	13
Ireland (IRMA)	25
New Zealand (Recorded Music NZ)	5
Scotland Singles (OCC)	3
UK Singles (OCC)	3
UK Airplay (Music Week)	15

Chart (2007)	Peak position
UK Singles (OCC)	17

=== Year-end charts ===
Chart (1999)	Position
Australia (ARIA)	48
UK Singles (OCC)	91

== Certifications ==
Region	Certification	Certified units/sales
Australia (ARIA)	Platinum	70,000^{^}
United Kingdom (BPI)	Silver	200,000^{^}
^{^} Shipments figures based on certification alone.

== Release history ==
Region	Date	Format(s)	Label(s)	Ref.
United Kingdom	22 March 1999	CD; cassette	Innocent; Virgin	
United States	10 August 1999	Contemporary hit radio	Innocent; Virgin	

== Play version ==
"Honey to the Bee"

Song by Play

from the album Replay
- Released: 2003
- Length: 4:14
- Label: Columbia
- Songwriters: Wendy Page, Jim Marr
- Producers: Desmond Child, Bill Padley, Rick Wake, Pamela Sheyne

In June 2003, Swedish girl group Play covered the song on their third album Replay. Play's version featured a trip hop beat and soprano vocals.
