= Because We Want To =

1998 single by Billie Piper

Single by Billie

from the album Honey to the B
- B-side: "G.H.E.T.T.O.U.T."
- Released: 29 June 1998
- Studio: Ridge Farm (Surrey, England); Marcus (London, England)
- Genre: Pop
- Length: 3:48
- Label: Innocent; Virgin
- Songwriters: Dion Rambo; Jacques Richmond; Wendy Page; Jim Marr
- Producers: Jim Marr; Wendy Page

Billie singles chronology
"Because We Want To" (1998)	"Girlfriend" (1998)

Music video
- "Because We Want To" on YouTube

"Because We Want To" is a song performed by English pop singer Billie. The song was written by Dion Rambo, Jacques Richmond, Wendy Page, and Jim Marr and produced by Marr and Page for Billie's debut album, Honey to the B (1998). It was released as her debut single on 29 June 1998 and entered the UK Singles Chart at number one in July 1998, making Billie the youngest artist to debut at number one, at age 15. It also reached the top 10 in Ireland, New Zealand, and Sweden. The song was the official theme of the 1999 FIFA Women's World Cup.

== Chart performance ==
Selling over 80,000 copies during its opening week, "Because We Want To" made Billie the youngest artist to debut at number one on the UK Singles Chart, aged 15. However, Helen Shapiro still holds the record as the youngest solo female singer to have topped the UK Singles Chart; "You Don't Know" rose to number one in 1961, when Shapiro was 14 years and 10 months old. Outside the United Kingdom, the song became a top-10 hit in Ireland, New Zealand, and Sweden, peaking at numbers nine, nine, and eight, respectively. Although the song became a hit in Canada, peaking at number 14 on the Canadian Singles Chart and number 30 on the RPM 100 Hit Tracks chart in September 1998, it did not chart in the United States.

== Music video ==
The video (directed by Phil Griffin) starts in a run-down street in London, where the ground is violently shaking. The reason is soon seen: A UFO is flying just metres from the ground. Billie is then seen teleporting from the ship and down onto the street. She starts singing and dancing and soon gathers huge crowds of supporters. In the video, cut scenes of Billie and her friends walking down side streets are seen. In one scene, she melts a bin which transforms into a dancing humanoid and in another scene she graffitis "Billie" on a billboard and an animated character then jumps from the billboard and dances along with the humanoid made from the melted bin. Later in the video, she and her friends sneak into a warehouse and have a party.

== Track listings ==
UK CD1; Canadian, Australasian, and Japanese CD single

1. "Because We Want To" (radio mix) – 3:45
2. "G.H.E.T.T.O.U.T." – 4:19
3. "Because We Want To" (Sgt. Rock 'Old Skool' mix-edit) – 4:11
4. "Because We Want To" (Tall Paul v's Billie mix) – 8:47

UK CD2

1. "Because We Want To" (radio mix) – 3:45
2. "Because We Want To" (street mix featuring Sweet P) – 5:12
3. "Because We Want To" (radio mix instrumental) – 3:45
4. "Because We Want To" (video)

UK cassette single

A1. "Because We Want To" (radio mix) – 3:45
A2. "G.H.E.T.T.O.U.T." – 4:19
B1. "Because We Want To" (Tall Paul v's Billie mix) – 8:47

European CD single

1. "Because We Want To" (radio mix) – 3:45
2. "G.H.E.T.T.O.U.T." – 4:19

US 12-inch single

A1. "Because We Want To" (Tall Paul vs. Billie)
A2. "Because We Want To" (radio mix)
B1. "Because We Want To" (Sgt. Rock Old Skool mix)
B2. "Because We Want To" (street mix)

== Credits and personnel ==
Credits are lifted from the Honey to the B album booklet.

Studios

- Recorded at Ridge Farm (Surrey, England) and Marcus Studios (London, England)
- Mixed at Metropolis Studios (London, England)

Personnel

- Dion Rambo – writing
- Jacques Richmond – writing
- Wendy Page – writing, backing vocals, vocal arrangement, production, mixing
- Jim Marr – writing, keyboards, programming, production, mixing
- Billie Piper – vocals
- Roger Jackson – additional keyboards
- Yak Bondy – additional programming
- Pete Craigie – recording, mixing
- Steve Cooper – assistant engineering (Ridge Farm)
- Michelle Barry – assistant engineering (Marcus)
- Matt Tait – assistant engineering (Metropolis)

== Charts ==
=== Weekly charts ===
Chart (1998)	Peak position
Australia (ARIA)	19
Belgium (Ultratip Bubbling Under Flanders)	5
Canada (Nielsen SoundScan)	14
Canada Top Singles (RPM)	30
Europe (Eurochart Hot 100)	5
Iceland (Íslenski Listinn Topp 40)	24
Ireland (IRMA)	9
Italy Airplay (Music & Media)	9
New Zealand (Recorded Music NZ)	9
Scottish Singles Sales (Official Charts)	2
Sweden (Sverigetopplistan)	8
UK Singles (Official Charts)	1
UK Airplay (Music Week)	13

=== Year-end charts ===
Chart (1998)	Position
Australia (ARIA)	98
Sweden (Hitlistan)	56
UK Singles (OCC)	48

== Certifications ==
Region	Certification	Certified units/sales
United Kingdom (BPI)	Silver	319,000

== Release history ==
Region	Date	Format(s)	Label(s)	Ref.
United Kingdom	29 June 1998	CD; cassette	Innocent; Virgin	
Japan	11 November 1998	CD	Innocent; Virgin	
