= Billie Piper =

English actress and former singer (born 1982)

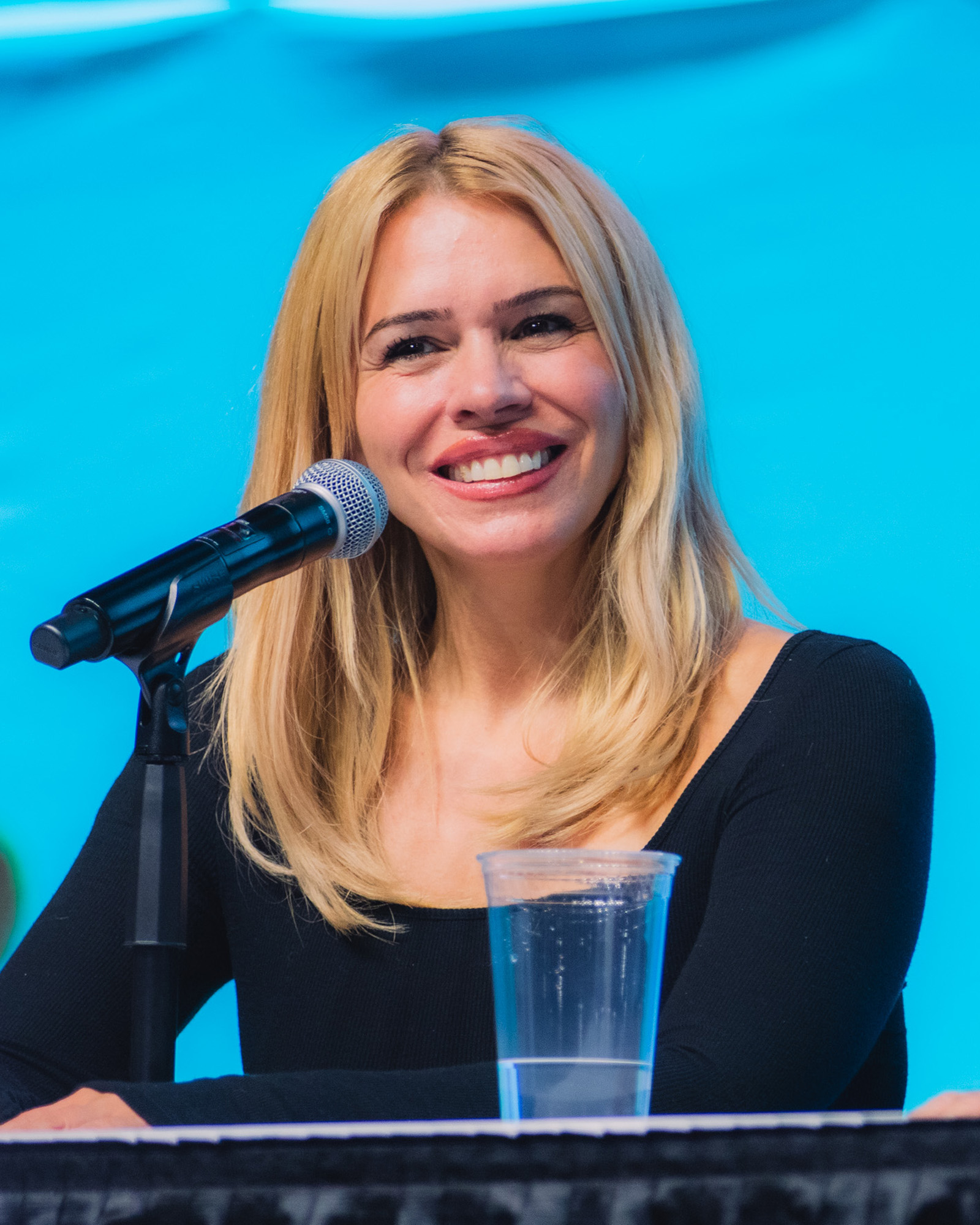
- Piper in 2025
- Born: Leian Paul Piper; 22 September 1982 (age 44); Swindon, Wiltshire, England
- Education: Sylvia Young Theatre School
- Occupations: Actress; singer
- Years active: 1996–present
- Notable work: Doctor Who
- Spouses: Chris Evans (m. 2001; div. 2007); Laurence Fox (m. 2007; div. 2016)
- Partner: Johnny Lloyd (2016–2023)
- Children: 3
- Awards: Full list
- Musical career
- Genres: Pop; dance-pop
- Instrument: Vocals
- Years active: 1996–2001
- Labels: Innocent; Virgin
- Website: billiepiperofficial.com

Billie Paul Piper (born Leian Paul Piper; 22 September 1982) is an English actress and former singer. She initially gained recognition as a singer after releasing her debut single "Because We Want To" at the age of 15, which made her the youngest female singer to enter the UK Singles Chart at number one. Her follow-up single "Girlfriend" also entered at number one. In 1998, Piper released her debut studio album, Honey to the B, which was certified platinum by the British Phonographic Industry (BPI). Her second studio album, Walk of Life, was released in 2000 and spawned her third number-one single, "Day & Night". In 2003, Piper announced that she had ended her music career to focus on acting.

Piper appeared in the BBC One sci-fi series Doctor Who as Rose Tyler, companion to The Doctor, as a regular from 2005 and 2006, and made guest appearances in 2008 and 2010. She made further appearances in the series' 50th anniversary special (2013) as "The Moment", though still credited as Rose Tyler, and in "The Reality War" (2025) in an unnamed role.

She starred as Belle de Jour in the drama series Secret Diary of a Call Girl (2007–2011), as Brona Croft/Lily in the Showtime horror series Penny Dreadful (2014–2016), and as Karen Mars in Netflix Original series Collateral (2018), for which she was nominated for a British Academy Television Award for Best Supporting Actress. Piper co-created and starred in the Sky Atlantic series I Hate Suzie (2020–2022), for which she earned a BAFTA nomination for Best Actress in 2021 and 2023. In 2025 she began starring as Isadora Capri, in the Netflix comedy-horror series Wednesday.

Piper's performance in Yerma won both the 2017 Laurence Olivier Award for Best Actress in a Leading Role in a Play and the 2016 Evening Standard Theatre Award for Best Actress for her "breathtakingly-intense" critically-acclaimed performance. The Guardian described Piper as "one of the most exciting stage actors of her generation."

== Early life and education ==
Piper was born in Swindon, Wiltshire, on 22 September 1982. She was initially named Leian Paul Piper, but her first name was legally changed to Billie on 25 April 1983 by her parents, Mandy Kent and Paul Piper. She has three siblings. Piper started dance classes aged five. then later, she appeared in American TV commercials for the likes of Kool-Aid and Honeycomb cereal. In 1996, she became an extra for the 1996 film Evita. She attended Bradon Forest School in Purton, near Swindon, but left at around the age of 12 after winning a scholarship to the Sylvia Young Theatre School in London.

== Career ==
=== Music career ===
Piper's career began when she was selected to appear on the Saturday morning children's television show Scratchy & Co. She later landed a role in a television commercial promoting the pop magazine Smash Hits. She was offered a record deal at the age of 15, and in 1998, became the youngest artist to debut at number one in the UK Singles Chart with "Because We Want To", released under the stage mononym "Billie". Her follow-up single "Girlfriend" also debuted at number one.

Piper's debut album Honey to the B was released immediately afterwards, and entered and peaked at number 14 on the UK Albums Chart, selling more than 300,000 copies in the United Kingdom alone along with a platinum certification, and a double-platinum certification in New Zealand, where it peaked at number three on the New Zealand Albums Chart. However, Honey to the B found limited success in other territories, such as Australia, where it entered and peaked at number 31 on the ARIA Albums Chart despite the success of "Honey to the Bee", and in the US it went almost completely unnoticed, peaking at number 17 on the Billboard Heatseekers Chart.

At the 1998 Smash Hits Poll Winners' party, Piper was nominated for Best New Act (for which she came second, it being won by B*Witched) and won Princess of Pop (she was the first to win this award). She then released "She Wants You" as the third single from the album. The song reached number three. "Honey to the Bee" was released as the fourth single from the album; like the previous single, it reached number three. At the same time, "She Wants You" was released in the US, reaching number 9 on the "Hot Club Dance Play" chart.

In 1999, Piper was nominated for two BRIT Awards and won two awards at the 1999 Smash Hits Poll Winners' party, although she was reduced to tears at the latter ceremony after being booed by fans of Ritchie Neville, whom she was dating at the time. She then started to tour and release in Asia. The singles and the album were released in mid- to late 1999. In August of that year, the follow-up to "Because We Want To" was released in Japan, a single comprising "Girlfriend" and "She Wants You" combined. She recorded a song for Pokémon: The First Movie titled "Makin' My Way (Any Way That I Can)".

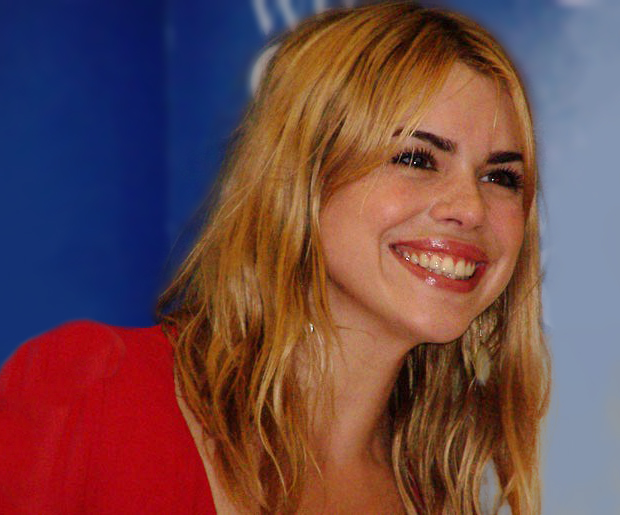
Piper in 2004

During that time, Piper recorded her second album. She decided to release further records under her full name of Billie Piper. She returned to the Singles Chart in May 2000 with her third number-one single "Day & Night". She waited until September to release "Something Deep Inside", which reached number four, but her success waned. In October 2000, Piper released her second album, Walk of Life, which reached No. 14 in the UK Album Chart, but quickly fell off the charts and was certified silver in the UK. The album charted in two other countries: New Zealand, where it reached No. 17, and Australia, where it peaked at No. 23. In Piper's autobiography, she states that the album was a "commercial bomb". The song "Walk of Life", the final single off the album, was released in December 2000 and reached No. 25 in the UK Singles Chart.

In February 2001, Piper appeared in court to testify against a woman named Juliet Peters. Peters was charged with, and eventually convicted of, stalking as well as making numerous threats against Piper and members of her family. Peters received psychiatric treatment as part of her sentence. According to her autobiography, Piper was reluctant about the court case, but was pushed by her parents and her label. She also stated in the book that this was why "The Tide Is High" was not released as a single, writing: "The court case succeeded in doing what I alone could not – cutting the ties. Without it I might have been tempted back."

In January 2007, BBC Radio 1 DJ Chris Moyles started a campaign to get "Honey to the Bee" back into the top 100 on download sales as a way of testing out new chart rules that favour download sales. The campaign was successful, with "Honey to the Bee" re-entering the official UK singles chart at No. 17, eight years after it was first released.

=== Film and television performances ===
In 2004, Piper appeared in the films The Calcium Kid and Things to Do Before You're 30. Shortly before starting work on Doctor Who, she had a starring role in the horror film Spirit Trap, released in August 2005 to poor reviews. In November 2005, she starred as Hero in a BBC adaptation of Much Ado About Nothing, updated for the modern day in a similar manner to the Canterbury Tales (2003) series in which she featured, with Hero now being a weather presenter in a television station.

In 2005, Doctor Who was resurrected after a sixteen-year absence from TV. Piper was cast as Rose Tyler, a travelling companion to the ninth incarnation of The Doctor (played by Christopher Eccleston). Piper won the Most Popular Actress category at the 2005 and 2006 National Television Awards for her work on Doctor Who. BBC News named her one of its "Faces of the Year" for 2005, primarily due to her success in Doctor Who. At The South Bank Show Awards in January 2006, she was awarded The Times Breakthrough Award for her successful transition from singing to acting. In March, the Television and Radio Industries Club named her as the best new TV talent at their annual awards ceremony. In September, she was named Best Actress at the TV Quick and TV Choice Awards.

After the completion of the very successful first series of the revamped Doctor Who, the British media regularly released conflicting reports about how long Piper would be staying with the show. In March 2006, she claimed that she would continue on Doctor Who into its third series in 2007. In May, however, she was reported to be considering quitting the series, although she did express an interest in playing a female version of the Doctor in the future (possibly related to a proposed Doctor Who spin-off series about Rose, which was later dropped). In June, the BBC announced that she was to depart in "Doomsday" (2006), the final episode of the second series. Her decision to leave had been made a year previously, but had not yet been made public.

Piper starred as Hannah Baxter in Secret Diary of a Call Girl (2007–2012), an ITV2 adaptation of Brooke Magnanti's The Intimate Adventures of a London Call Girl, a memoir detailing the life of a high-class prostitute who adopted "Belle de Jour" as her pseudonym, which aired from September 2007. As part of her preparation for the role, Piper met the memoir's author two years before her identity as a research scientist was revealed in a Sunday newspaper: "I absolutely had to meet the person behind the words to be able to take the part... people did ask me about her and I just had to smile, to avoid giving anything away."

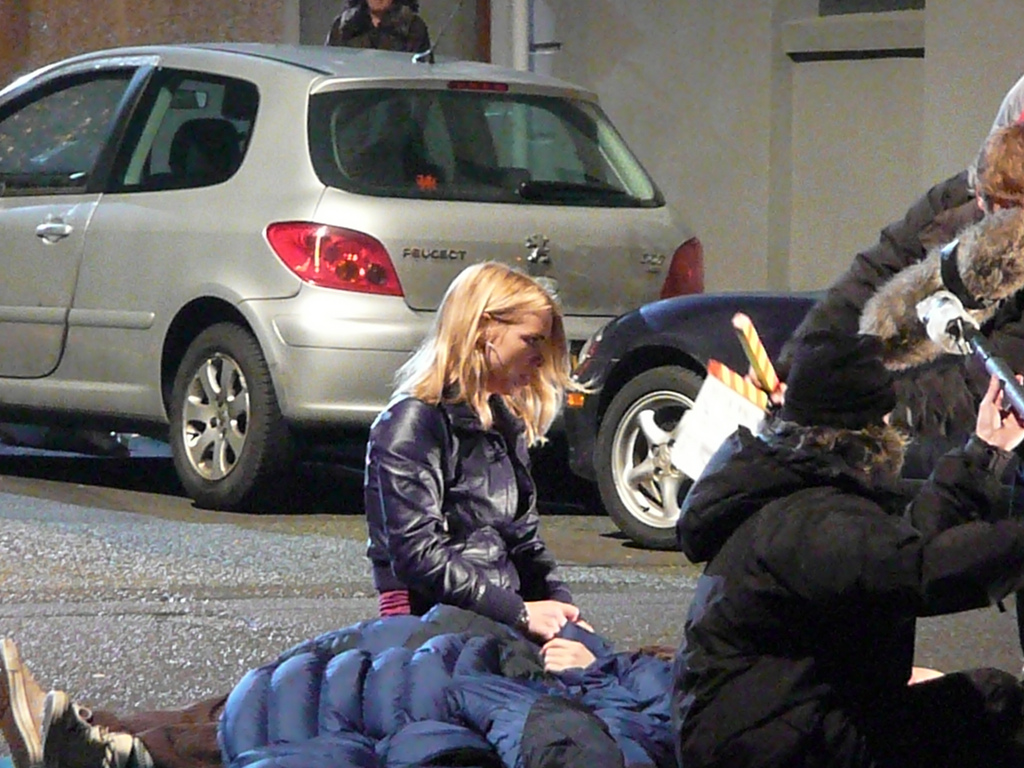
Piper and David Tennant filming the fourth series of Doctor Who in Penarth

In November 2007, the BBC confirmed that she would reprise her role as Rose Tyler in the fourth series of Doctor Who for three episodes. Later, it was confirmed by Russell T Davies in Doctor Who Magazine that this return had been planned since she left. The series began in April 2008, and after several cameos, Piper made her official return as Rose in the series four final episodes "Turn Left", "The Stolen Earth", and "Journey's End". She did not initially state whether she would be reprising the role again. Interviewed on Doctor Who Confidential, she commented that "it's never really the end for the Doctor and Rose, but it's certainly the end for the foreseeable future".

Piper completed work on two stand-alone television productions. In the first, a BBC adaptation of Philip Pullman's historical novel The Ruby in the Smoke which was broadcast in December 2006, she played protagonist Sally Lockhart, a Victorian orphan. The BBC planned to film all four of Pullman's Sally Lockhart novels, with Piper continuing in the role in The Shadow in the North, which was shown in December 2007. Piper also appeared as Fanny Price in an adaptation of Jane Austen's novel Mansfield Park, screened on ITV1 in March 2007. This was her first acting role on television for a broadcaster other than the BBC. She then provided voice-overs for various television commercials, including one for Comfort fabric-softener airing in June 2007.

The second series of Secret Diary of a Call Girl, with Piper again in the starring role, started filming in May 2008, during which a body double was hired to hide Piper's pregnancy during the sex scenes. Piper was also quoted during this time as worrying that she may have "ruined her future career" due to the nature of the topless scenes and other sexual scenes required. The third series began airing in January 2010. For the third and fourth series Piper was credited as executive producer. In January 2010, tying in with the broadcast of the third series and following on from the real Belle de Jour confirming her real identity, ITV2 broadcast an interview special, Billie and the Real Belle Bare All, which saw Piper meeting with Dr Brooke Magnanti on camera for the first time.

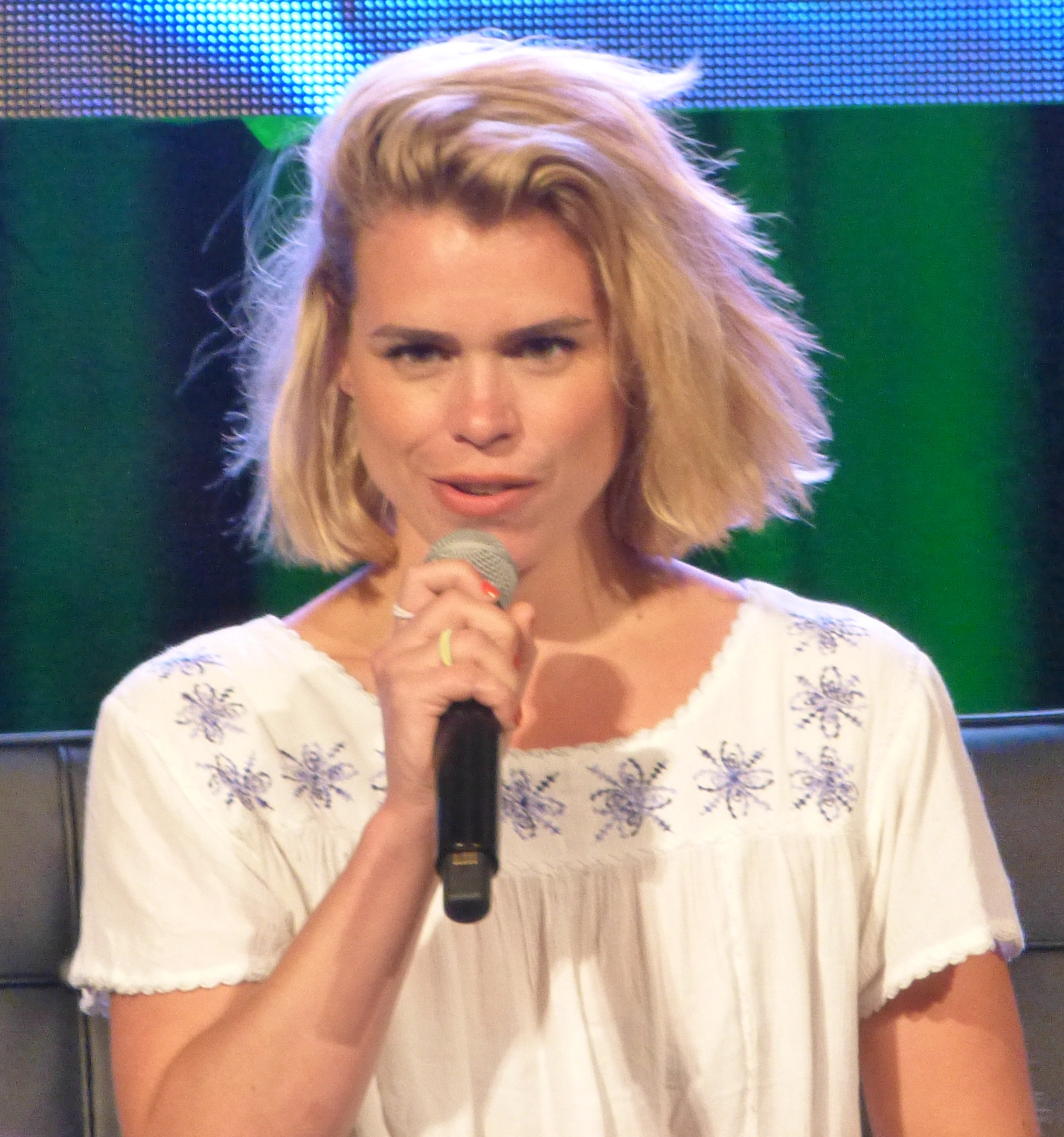
Piper at the Doctor Who panel at the 2015 Oz Comic Con

She reprised her role as Rose Tyler in "The End of Time", the last of the 2008–2010 Doctor Who specials, as a younger version of Rose Tyler (specifically 3 months before her initial meeting with the Ninth Doctor in 2005 episode "Rose"). She also shared the role of Betty with Sue Johnston in the two-part TV adaptation of A Passionate Woman, screened on BBC One in April 2010. In May 2011, it was announced that Piper would join the cast of a romance-comedy film directed by Robin Sheppard titled Truth about Lies. In January 2013, Piper stated on The Graham Norton Show that she had not been asked to return for the 50th anniversary of Doctor Who, however, the BBC announced in the following March that she would be returning in the special, titled "The Day of the Doctor", which was broadcast in November 2013. Despite being credited as Rose Tyler, Piper's actual role in the episode is the consciousness of "The Moment", a sentient weapon which takes on the form of Rose's "Bad Wolf" personality.

On 11 May 2014, Showtime aired a new horror series called Penny Dreadful in which Piper plays Brona Croft, a poor Irish immigrant who is trying to escape a dark past. In the show's second series, Brona is resurrected by Victor Frankenstein as "Lily". She was nominated for Best TV Supporting Actress at the 2015 Fangoria Chainsaw Awards. The show was renewed for a third and final series, which she began filming on 17 September 2015.

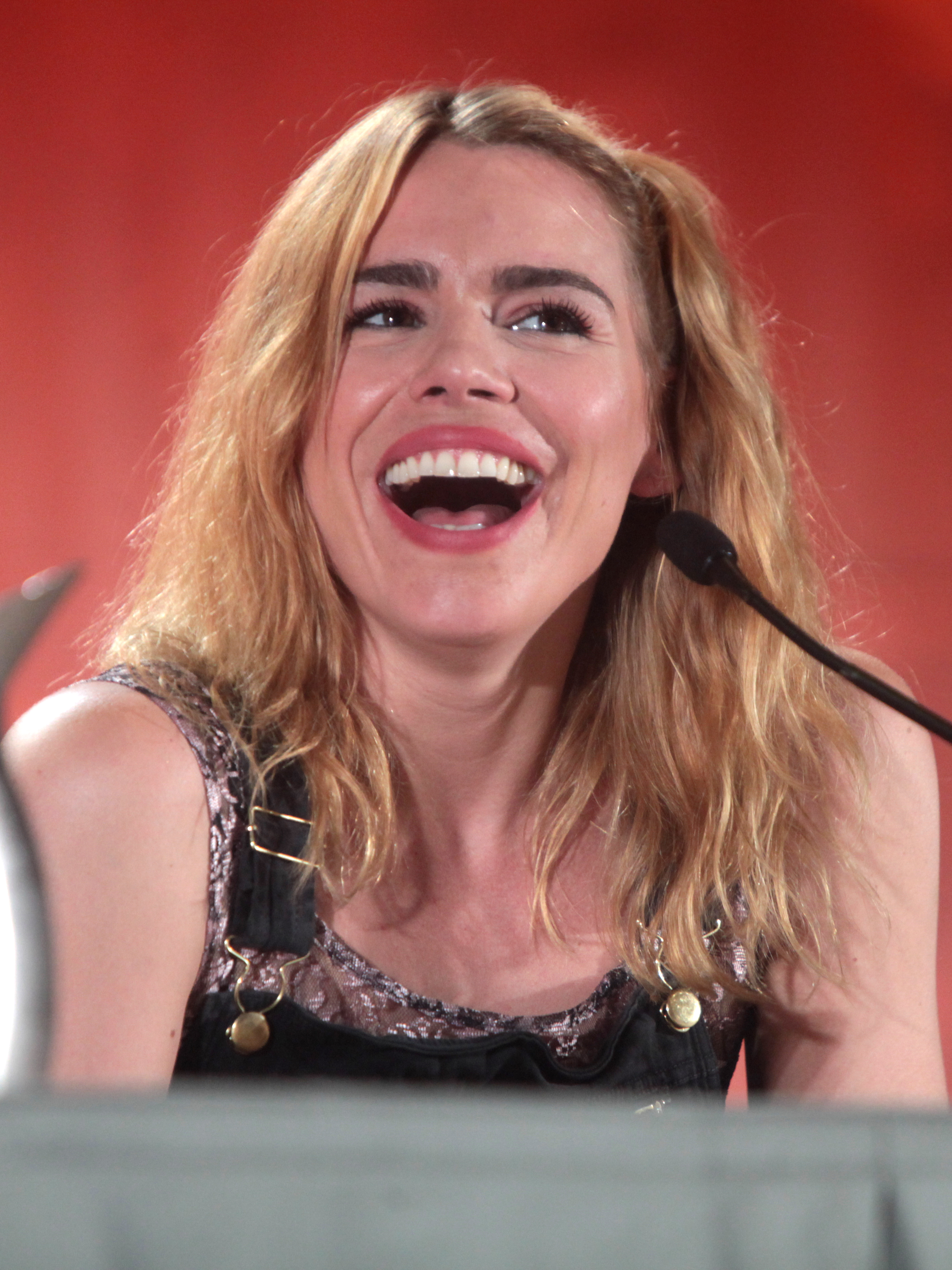
Piper at the 2016 Phoenix Comicon

Piper returned to the role of Rose Tyler alongside David Tennant in three stories that form the second volume of The Tenth Doctor Adventures audio drama series from Big Finish Productions. One story also featured Camille Coduri reprising her role as Rose's mother Jackie Tyler. The set was released in November 2017. It was later announced that Piper would be headlining her own audio drama titled Rose Tyler: The Dimension Cannon. The box set featured four stories with Rose Tyler alongside her parents Jackie (Coduri) and Pete Tyler (Shaun Dingwall) as well as featuring Clive from the episode "Rose", played by his original actor Mark Benton. The first volume was released in September 2019 with two more expected in October 2022 and September 2023.

In 2019, Piper wrote, starred in and made her directorial debut with the "anti-romcom" Rare Beasts, before appearing alongside Sally Hawkins, Alice Lowe, and David Thewlis in Eternal Beauty, directed by Craig Roberts. The following year, in August 2020, Piper co-created and starred in the critically acclaimed Sky Atlantic series I Hate Suzie. The series was also co-created and written by Secret Diary of a Call Girl creator Lucy Prebble. Piper portrays the titular Suzie Pickles, a former child screen star whose life and career are turned upside down by a compromising phone hack. Critics noted her own experience of having been a prodigious young singer-turned-actress who becomes famous at a young age would have informed her role as Pickles. The Guardian gave it a five-star review, describing Piper's character as "nude, lewd and joyously off the rails" in "this scabrously funny drama".

In March 2021, it was announced that Piper would appear in the film adaptation of a children's book called Catherine Called Birdy. In April 2022, Piper was announced to star and executive produce a Netflix series adaptation of the Terri White memoir Coming Undone. In February 2023, it was announced she would play Sam McAlister, the TV producer who secured Newsnight's interview with Prince Andrew, in Scoop, a Netflix adaptation of McAlister's book. On 7 May 2024, it was announced that Piper had joined the cast of Wednesday season two alongside Joanna Lumley and Christopher Lloyd; filming began that same month.

In May 2025, Piper returned to Doctor Who in "The Reality War" as a character who appeared to regenerate from Ncuti Gatwa's Fifteenth Doctor. Piper was not credited as the Doctor at the conclusion of the episode or in subsequent media releases, so her exact role remains unknown.

In August 2025, Piper appeared in the Netflix Original series Wednesday as Isadora Capri, the new music professor of Nevermore Academy. Several episodes feature Piper singing on screen for the first time since ending her music career, including a duet of "Bad Moon Rising" with Catherine Zeta Jones (who plays Morticia Addams).

=== Stage work ===
Piper made her stage debut in a touring production of Christopher Hampton's play Treats, which opened in early 2007 in Windsor, Berkshire. Treats was to have ended its tour in the West End, at the Garrick Theatre, starting in February 2007 with previews. The play officially closed in May.

Piper played Carly in the UK premiere of Neil LaBute's play Reasons to Be Pretty at the Almeida Theatre, running from November 2011 to January 2012. It received critical acclaim from The Guardian, The Observer, London Evening Standard, Metro, The Times, The Telegraph, Time Out, The Arts Desk, Daily Express and The Financial Times, all of which rated the production with a minimum of four stars. BBC Radio 4 described Piper as "fantastic, completely brilliant. Her performance is so convincing and moving, an absolutely terrific performance". The Jewish Chronicle hailed Piper's performance as second to none, being the best of the night, and stating that "no actor can cry more convincingly than Piper", giving the show four stars.

Piper made her National Theatre debut in The Effect by Lucy Prebble, which ran from November 2012 to February 2013. The play went on to become the most critically acclaimed show of the season and Piper was nominated for the WhatsOnStage Best Actress award for her work in The Effect. The play was also nominated for Best New Play and Best Set Designer. Due to success and demand, the show was extended for a further month and an online petition was started for the show to be added to the National Theatre's Live Programming. In 2013, Piper was nominated for Best Actress at the Olivier Awards and Evening Standard Theatre Awards for The Effect. Piper also starred in Great Britain at the Royal National Theatre in 2014. On 29 May 2014, Piper appeared alongside Ben Whishaw in the Playhouse Presents television special Foxtrot.

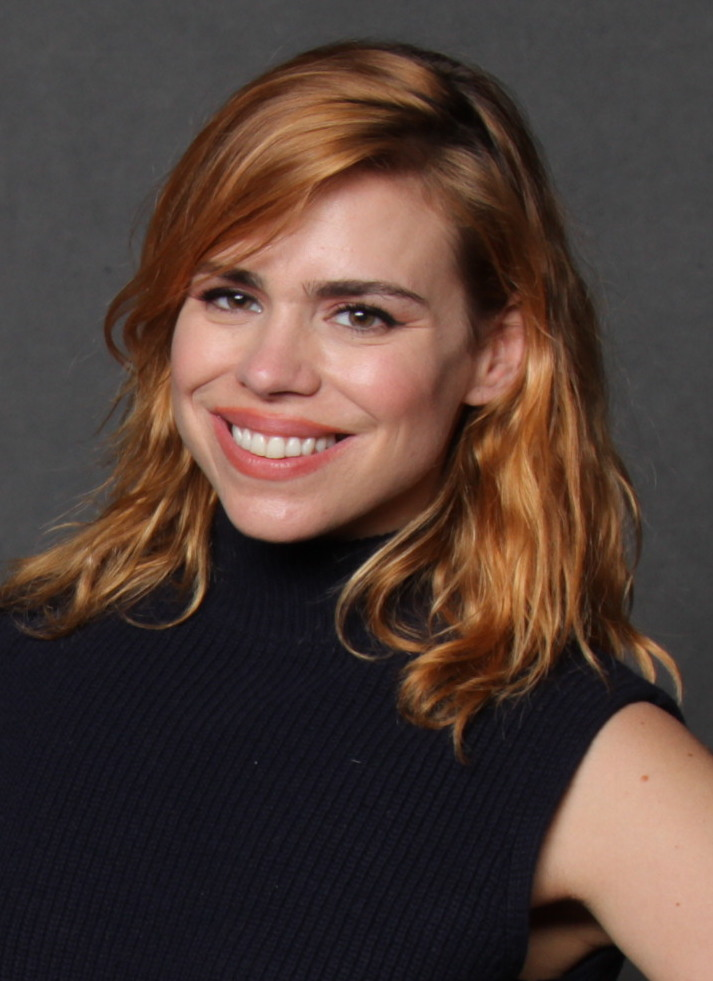
Piper at the 2016 Magic City Con

In 2016, Piper starred in an adaptation of Federico García Lorca's 1934 play Yerma at the Young Vic, written and directed by Simon Stone. Upon opening, the play received critical acclaim, mainly for Piper's performance. She was described as "earth-quaking" and "breathtakingly-intense" by The Guardian and "a generation's greatest performance" by The Stage. The Independent described her as "shattering" with the reviewer admitting he found himself "still visibly shaking from its effects on the Tube home afterwards." The Jewish Chronicle proclaimed, "This is the performance to which [Piper's] previous excellent appearances on stage have been leading. She's one of those rare actresses who can be monumentally tragic and almost casually realistic at the same time." Conversely, The Arts Desk warned its readers that her performance was "an utterly gruelling, almost unbearable 100 minutes." Piper won all six of the available Best Actress awards for that one performance, making it one of the most acclaimed and awarded stage performances in British theatre history, and making her the only actor to have picked up all six Best Actress awards for a single performance, including the coveted Olivier Award.

The play was streamed across the world from 21 September.

Piper reprised the performance in a limited run at New York's Park Avenue Armory during March and April 2018, her New York stage debut. She once again received unanimous critical praise. The New York Times said Piper's performance was "an unconditional victory" and "blisteringly powerful", whilst Hollywood Reporter found her "simply staggering" adding; "When the actress appears at the curtain call, looking emotionally and physical exhausted, you find yourself relieved that she's OK and concerned that she'll have to do it all over again the next night." Time Out likened Piper to an "angry beast" warning that her "astonishing" performance inflicted psychological-like emotions on the audience. NBC's Katie Englehart said, "Piper is so devastating I almost vomited in my seat – that doesn't sound like an endorsement but it is." Vogue hailed Piper as "one of the great talents of her generation" and described her performance as "astonishing, raw, feral and terrifying." The AM New York critic claimed to be left "gasping for air" whilst the New York Stage Review found Piper's "downward spiral into abyss utterly harrowing and blazingly remarkable."

== Personal life ==
Piper married television presenter Chris Evans in a secret ceremony at the Little Church of the West in Paradise, Nevada near Las Vegas on 6 May 2001 after six months of dating when she was just 18 years old and he was 35. The couple separated in 2004, and amicably divorced in May 2007, stressing that they remain friends.

Piper married actor Laurence Fox on 31 December 2007, at St Mary's Church in Easebourne, West Sussex. They have two sons. Piper was granted a divorce in May 2016. In 2024, Piper commented on the divorce in British Vogue, where she expressed the desire for her children to have privacy and anonymity, and the difficulty of this given Fox's public profile. Fox disputed some of Piper's claims. He also said that the pair had been to court many times since their split and criticised the family court system as biased towards the mother.

Piper began dating Johnny Lloyd, the frontman of Tribes, in 2016. They have a daughter. The couple separated in 2023.

== Acting credits ==
=== Film ===
Year	Title	Role	Notes	Ref.
1996	Evita	Girl wanting Juan Perón's autograph	Uncredited	
1996	The Leading Man	Girl	Uncredited	
2004	The Calcium Kid	Angel		
2005	Things to Do Before You're 30	Vicky		
2005	Spirit Trap	Jenny		
2010	Animals United	Bonnie (voice)		
2010	The Raven	Raven	Short film	
2016	City of Tiny Lights	Shelley		
2017	Beast	Grace	Short film	
2018	Two for Joy	Lilah		
2019	Rare Beasts	Mandy	Also writer and director	
2019	Eternal Beauty	Nicola		
2022	Catherine Called Birdy	Lady Aislinn		
2024	Scoop	Sam McAlister		
2026	Elsinore	Patsy Pollock		

=== Television ===
Year	Title	Role	Notes	Ref.
2003	The Canterbury Tales	Alison Crosby	Episode: "The Miller's Tale"	
2004	Bella and the Boys	Bella	Television film	
2005	ShakespeaRe-Told	Hero	Episode: "Much Ado About Nothing"	
2005–2006, 2008, 2010	Doctor Who	Rose Tyler	34 episodes: Series 1, 2 and 4, 2010 special	
2006	The Ruby in the Smoke	Sally Lockhart	Television film	
2007	Mansfield Park	Fanny Price	Television film	
2007	The Shadow in the North	Sally Lockhart	Television film	
2007–2011	Secret Diary of a Call Girl	Hannah Baxter	32 episodes; also shadow-directed a couple of scenes of each series	
2010	A Passionate Woman	Betty	2 episodes	
2012	True Love	Holly	Episode: "Holly"	
2013	Doctor Who	The Moment	Episode: "The Day of the Doctor"	
2014	Playhouse Present	Badger	Episode: "Foxtrot"	
2014–2016	Penny Dreadful	Brona Croft / Lily Frankenstein	27 episodes	
2018	Collateral	Karen Mars	4 episodes	
2020–2022	I Hate Suzie	Suzie Pickles	11 episodes; also co-creator	
2024	Austin	Herself	2 episodes	
2024	Kaos	Cassandra	4 episodes	
2025	Doctor Who	Time Lord version of Rose Tyler	Episode: "The Reality War"	
2025	Wednesday	Isadora Capri	Main role, Season 2	

=== Theatre ===
Year	Title	Role	Theatre	Notes	Ref.
2007	Treats	Ann	Garrick Theatre		
2011–2012	Reasons to Be Pretty	Carly	Almeida Theatre		
2012–2013	The Effect	Connie	National Theatre		
2014	Great Britain	Paige	National Theatre		
2016	Yerma	Yerma	Young Vic		
2017	Yerma	Yerma	Young Vic	Revival of the 2016 production	
2018	Yerma	Yerma	Park Avenue Armory	Off-Broadway transfer	

=== Audio ===
Year	Title	Role	Production	Notes	Ref.
2017	Doctor Who: The Tenth Doctor Adventures	Rose Tyler	Big Finish Productions	Volume 2	
2019	Warhammer Adventures: City of Lifestone	Narrator	Black Library	Part of the Realm Quest series	
2019	Warhammer Adventures: Lair of the Skaven	Narrator	Black Library	Part of the Realm Quest series	
2019	Warhammer Adventures: Forest of the Ancients	Narrator	Black Library	Part of the Realm Quest series	
2019, 2022–2023	Rose Tyler: The Dimension Cannon	Rose Tyler	Big Finish Productions	3 volumes	
2020	Mansfield Park	Narrator	Audible	Part of The Jane Austen Collection	
2020	Warhammer Adventures: Flight of the Kharadron	Narrator	Black Library	Part of the Realm Quest series	
2025–present	Doctor Who: The Ninth Doctor Adventures	Rose Tyler	Big Finish Productions	Series 4	

== Discography ==
- Honey to the B (1998)
- Walk of Life (2000)

== Accolades ==
Piper has won and been nominated for more than 70 recognised awards. During her musical career, she was nominated for two BRIT Awards in 1999. In 2005 and 2006, she won two National Television Awards for Best Actress for her acting work in Doctor Who. She has also been nominated for two British Academy Television Awards for Best Supporting Actress and Best Actress for her performances in the television dramas Collateral (2018) and I Hate Suzie (2020–2022), respectively.

For her role in the 2016 production of Federico García Lorca's Yerma, Piper has won a total of six Best Actress awards, including the Laurence Olivier Award, and is now the only actor to have earned all of the currently available UK theatre Best Actress awards for a single performance.

== See also ==
- List of British actors
