= Skin Games =

British pop/rock band

Skin Games were a British pop/rock band of the late 1980s and early 1990s that were signed to Epic Records. Their name was inspired by a Dylan Thomas short story. Critically acclaimed as artists, they never gained commercial success, and broke up after just one album, The Blood Rush, released in 1989. The soaring vocal style of lead singer Wendy Page has been compared with both Kate Bush and the Cocteau Twins but the music is otherwise hard to categorise. The band released a number of singles from the album, but only "Brilliant Shining" managed to gain any significant airplay. Their first single, "Cowboy Joe", was produced by Steve Hillage.

Skin Games were:

- Wendy Page (vocals)
- Jim Marr (bass guitar)
- Jonny Willett (lead guitar)
- Dave Innes (drums)
- Adam Lee (keyboards)

Despite sinking with relatively little trace, Wendy Page and Jim Marr went on to pen two UK number one hits for other artists ("Because We Want To" and "Perfect Moment"). They also wrote and produced "Dangerous to Know" on Hilary Duff's third album. In 1999, Page collaborated with production duo Tin Tin Out on the album Eleven to Fly, co-writing and providing lead vocals on the majority of the tracks. She also continues to have a solo career.
