= Standard Theatre Award for Best Actor =

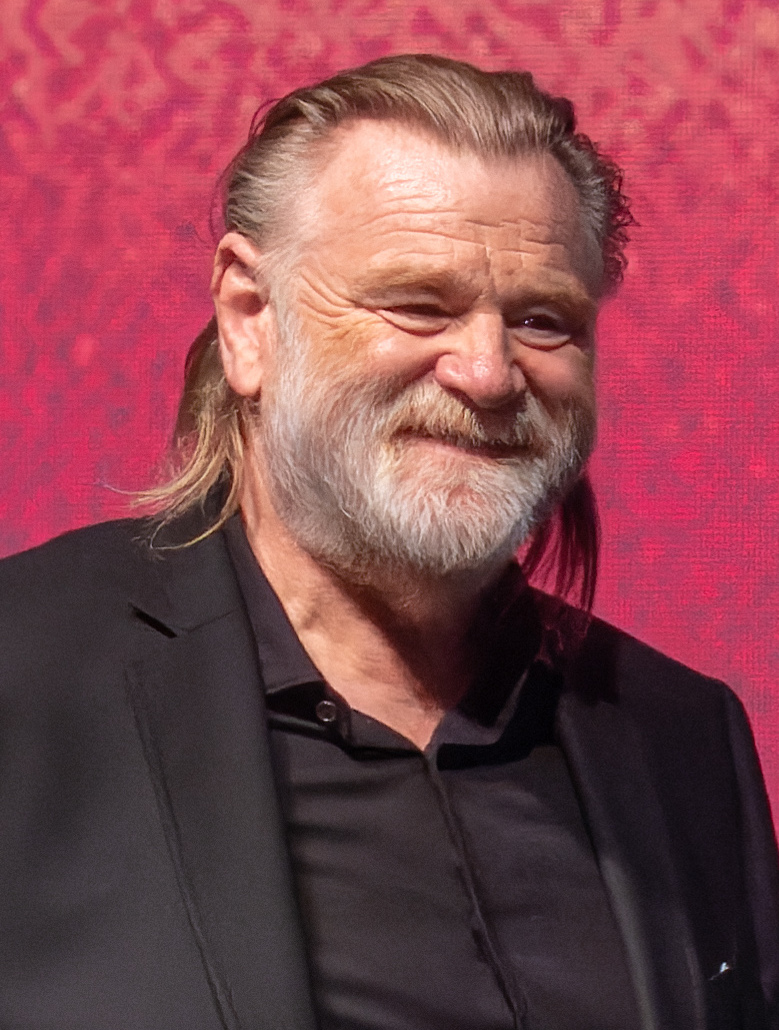
- 2025 recipient: Brendan Gleeson
- Awarded for: Best Actor
- Location: United Kingdom
- Presented by: The Standard
- Currently held by: Brendan Gleeson for The Weir (2025)

The Standard Theatre Award for Best Actor is an award presented since 1955 by The Standard in recognition of achievement in London theatre. Richard Burton was the inaugural winner of the award. The most recent recipient is Andrew Scott.

Simon Russell Beale has won the award the most frequently, with four separate wins. Albert Finney, Ian Holm, Alec McCowen, Laurence Olivier, and Paul Scofield have each won the award thrice, while thirteen other actors have won twice. Chiwetel Ejiofor was the first black actor to win, and Adrian Lester was the second. Two instances have occurred where two actors have been awarded as winners from the same play: In 2011, Benedict Cumberbatch and Jonny Lee Miller from Frankenstein; and again in 2013, Rory Kinnear and Lester from Othello. 2001 was the first year in which additional runner-ups/nominees were recognized, rather than just the winners as in all the years' prior.

== Winners and nominees ==
=== 1950s ===
Year	Actor	Work	Character
1955
1955	Richard Burton	Henry V	Henry V
1956
1956	Paul Scofield	The Power and the Glory	The Priest
1957
1957	Laurence Olivier	The Entertainer	Archie Rice
1958
1958	Michael Redgrave	A Touch of the Sun	Philip Lester
1959
1959	Eric Porter	Rosmersholm	John Rosmer

=== 1960s ===
Year	Actor	Work	Character
1960
1960	Alec Guinness	Ross	T. E. Lawrence
1960	Rex Harrison	Platonov	Mikhail Platonov
1961
1961	Christopher Plummer	Becket	Henry II
1962
1962	Paul Scofield	King Lear	King Lear
1963
1963	Michael Redgrave	Uncle Vanya	Uncle Vanya
1964
1964	Nicol Williamson	Inadmissible Evidence	Bill Maitland
1965
1965	Ian Holm	Henry V	Henry V
1966
1966	Albert Finney	A Flea in Her Ear	Victor Emmanuel Chandebise
1967
1967	Laurence Olivier	Dance of Death	Edgar
1968
1968	Alec McCowen	Hadrian VII	Frederick Rolfe
1969
1969	Nicol Williamson	Hamlet	Hamlet

=== 1970s ===
Year	Actor	Work	Character
1970
1970	John Gielgud	Home	Harry
1970	Ralph Richardson	Home	Jack
1971
1971	Alan Bates	Butley	Ben Butley
1972
1972	Laurence Olivier	Long Day's Journey into Night	James Tyrone
1973
1973	Alec McCowen	The Misanthrope	Alceste
1974
1974	John Wood	Travesties	Henry Carr
1975
1975	John Gielgud	No Man's Land	Spooner
1976
1976	Albert Finney	Tamburlaine the Great	Tamburlaine
1977
1977	Donald Sinden	King Lear	King Lear
1978
1978	Alan Howard	Coriolanus	Coriolanus
1979
1979	Warren Mitchell	Death of a Salesman	Willy Loman

=== 1980s ===
Year	Actor	Work	Character
1980
1980	Tom Courtenay	The Dresser	Norman
1981
1981	Alan Howard	Good	John Halder
1982
1982	Alec McCowen	The Portage to San Cristobal of A.H.	Adolf Hitler
1983
1983	Derek Jacobi	Much Ado About Nothing	Benedick
1984
1984	Ian McKellen	Coriolanus	Coriolanus
1985
1985	Antony Sher	Richard III	Richard III
1986
1986	Albert Finney	Orphans	Harold
1987
1987	Michael Gambon	A View from the Bridge	Eddie Carbone
1988
1988	Eric Porter	Cat on a Hot Tin Roof	Big Daddy
1989
1989	Ian McKellen	Othello	Iago

=== 1990s ===
Year	Actor	Work	Character
1990
1990	Richard Harris	Henry IV	Henry IV
1991
1991	John Wood	King Lear	King Lear
1992
1992	Nigel Hawthorne	The Madness of George III	George III
1993
1993	Ian Holm	Moonlight	Andy
1994
1994	Tom Courtenay	Moscow Stations	Venichka Yerofeev
1995
1995	Michael Gambon	Volpone	Volpone
1996
1996	Paul Scofield	John Gabriel Borkman	John Gabriel Borkman
1997
1997	Ian Holm	King Lear	King Lear
1998
1998	Kevin Spacey	The Iceman Cometh	Theodore "Hickey" Hickman
1999
1999	Stephen Dillane	The Real Thing	Henry

=== 2000s ===
Year	Actor	Work	Character
2000
2000	Simon Russell Beale	Hamlet	Prince Hamlet
2001
2001	Alex Jennings	The Relapse and The Winter's Tale	Lord Foppington and Leontes
2001	William Houston	Henry IV, Part 1 and Part 2 and Henry V	Prince Hal and Henry V
2001	Alan Rickman	Private Lives	Elyot Chase
2002
2002	Simon Russell Beale	Twelfth Night and Uncle Vanya	Malvolio and Uncle Vanya
2002	Daniel Craig	A Number	Bernard 1, Bernard 2, and Michael Black
2002	Tom Georgeson	Frozen	Ralph Wantage
2003
2003	Michael Sheen	Caligula	Caligula
2003	Kenneth Branagh	Edmond	Edmond Burke
2003	Warren Mitchell	The Price	Gregory Solomon
2004
2004	Richard Griffiths	The History Boys	Douglas Hector
2004	Douglas Hodge	Dumb Show	Barry
2004	Stanley Townsend	Shining City	John
2005
2005	Simon Russell Beale	The Philanthropist	Philip
2005	Brian Dennehy	Death of a Salesman	Willy Loman
2005	Derek Jacobi	Don Carlos	Philip II of Spain
2006
2006	Rufus Sewell	Rock 'n' Roll	Jan
2006	Bill Irwin	Who’s Afraid of Virginia Woolf?	George
2006	Michael Sheen	Frost/Nixon	David Frost
2006	Kevin Spacey	A Moon for the Misbegotten	Jim Tyrone
2007
2007	Patrick Stewart	Macbeth	Macbeth
2007	Charles Dance	Shadowlands	C.S. Lewis
2007	Robert Lindsay	The Entertainer	Archie Rice
2007	Mark Rylance	Boeing Boeing	Robert
2008
2008	Chiwetel Ejiofor	Othello	Othello
2008	Kenneth Branagh	Ivanov	Ivanov
2008	David Calder	King Lear	King Lear
2009
2009	Mark Rylance	Jerusalem	Johnny "Rooster" Byron
2009	Simon Russell Beale	The Winter's Tale	Leontes
2009	Ken Stott	A View from the Bridge	Eddie Carbone
2009	Samuel West	ENRON	Jeffrey Skilling

=== 2010s ===
Year	Actor	Work	Character
2010
2010	Rory Kinnear	Hamlet and Measure For Measure	Hamlet and Angelo
2010	Roger Allam	Henry IV, Parts 1 and 2	Falstaff
2010	David Suchet	All My Sons	Joe Keller
2011
2011	Benedict Cumberbatch	Frankenstein	The Creature / Victor Frankenstein
2011	Jonny Lee Miller	Frankenstein	The Creature / Victor Frankenstein
2011	Bertie Carvel	Matilda the Musical	Miss Trunchbull
2011	Charles Edwards	Much Ado About Nothing	Benedick
2012
2012	Simon Russell Beale	Collaborators	Joseph Stalin
2012	Charles Edwards	The King's Speech and This House	George VI and Jack Weatherill
2012	Adrian Lester	Red Velvet	Ira Aldridge
2012	Luke Treadaway	The Curious Incident of the Dog in the Night-Time	Christopher Boone
2013
2013	Rory Kinnear	Othello	Iago
2013	Adrian Lester	Othello	Othello
2013	Chiwetel Ejiofor	A Season in the Congo	Patrice Lumumba
2014
2014	Tom Hiddleston	Coriolanus	Coriolanus
2014	Ben Miles	Wolf Hall and Bring Up the Bodies	Thomas Cromwell
2014	Mark Strong	A View from the Bridge	Eddie Carbone
2015
2015	James McAvoy	The Ruling Class	Jack Gurney
2015	Kenneth Cranham	The Father	Andre
2015	Ralph Fiennes	Man and Superman	Jack Tanner
2015	Simon Russell Beale	Temple	The Dean
2016
2016	Ralph Fiennes	The Master Builder and Richard III	Halvard Solness and Richard III
2016	Kenneth Branagh	The Entertainer	Archie Rice
2016	O. T. Fagbenle	Ma Rainey’s Black Bottom	Levee
2016	James McArdle	Platonov	Mikhail Platonov
2016	Ian McKellen	No Man's Land	Spooner
2017
2017	Andrew Garfield	Angels in America	Prior Walter
2017	Bertie Carvel	Ink	Rupert Murdoch
2017	Andrew Scott	Hamlet	Hamlet
2018
2018	Ralph Fiennes	Antony and Cleopatra	Mark Antony
2018	Bryan Cranston	Network	Howard Beale
2018	Ian McKellen	King Lear	King Lear
2018	Colin Morgan	Translations	Owen
2018	Kyle Soller	The Inheritance	Eric Glass
2019
2019	Andrew Scott	Present Laughter	Garry Essendine
2019	K. Todd Freeman	Downstate	Dee
2019	Francis Guinan	Downstate	Fred
2019	Tom Hiddleston	Betrayal	Robert
2019	Wendell Pierce	Death of a Salesman	Willy Loman

=== 2020s ===
Year	Actor	Work	Character
2022
2022	James McAvoy	Cyrano de Bergerac	Cyrano
2022	Paapa Essiedu	A Number	Various
2022	Shubham Saraf	The Father and the Assassin	Nathuram Godse
2022	Lennie James	A Number	Salter
2022	Giles Terera	Blues for an Alabama Sky	Guy Jacobs
2023
2023	Andrew Scott	Vanya	Various
2023	Paapa Essiedu	The Effect	Tristan
2023	Mark Gatiss	The Motive and the Cue	Sir John Gielgud
2023	Paul Mescal	A Streetcar Named Desire	Stanley Kowalski
2025
2025	Brendan Gleeson	The Weir	Jack
2025	Jonathan Bailey	Richard II	Richard II
2025	Tom Hiddleston	Much Ado About Nothing	Benedick
2025	Michael Shannon	A Moon for the Misbegotten	James Tyrone Jr.
2025	David Shields	Punch	Jacob Dunne

== Multiple awards and nominations ==
=== Awards ===
4 wins

- Simon Russell Beale

3 wins

- Albert Finney
- Ian Holm
- Alec McCowen
- Laurence Olivier
- Paul Scofield

2 wins

- Tom Courtenay
- Ralph Fiennes
- Michael Gambon
- John Gielgud
- Alan Howard
- Rory Kinnear
- James McAvoy
- Ian McKellen
- Eric Porter
- Michael Redgrave
- Andrew Scott
- Nicol Williamson
- John Wood

=== Nominations ===
6 nominations

- Simon Russell Beale

3 nominations

- Kenneth Branagh
- Tom Hiddleston
- Andrew Scott

2 nominations

- Bertie Carvel
- Paapa Essiedu
- Charles Edwards
- James McAvoy
- Ian McKellen

== See also ==
- Laurence Olivier Award for Best Actor
- Critics' Circle Theatre Award for Best Actor
- Tony Award for Best Actor in a Play
