= Paapa Essiedu =

British actor (born 1990)

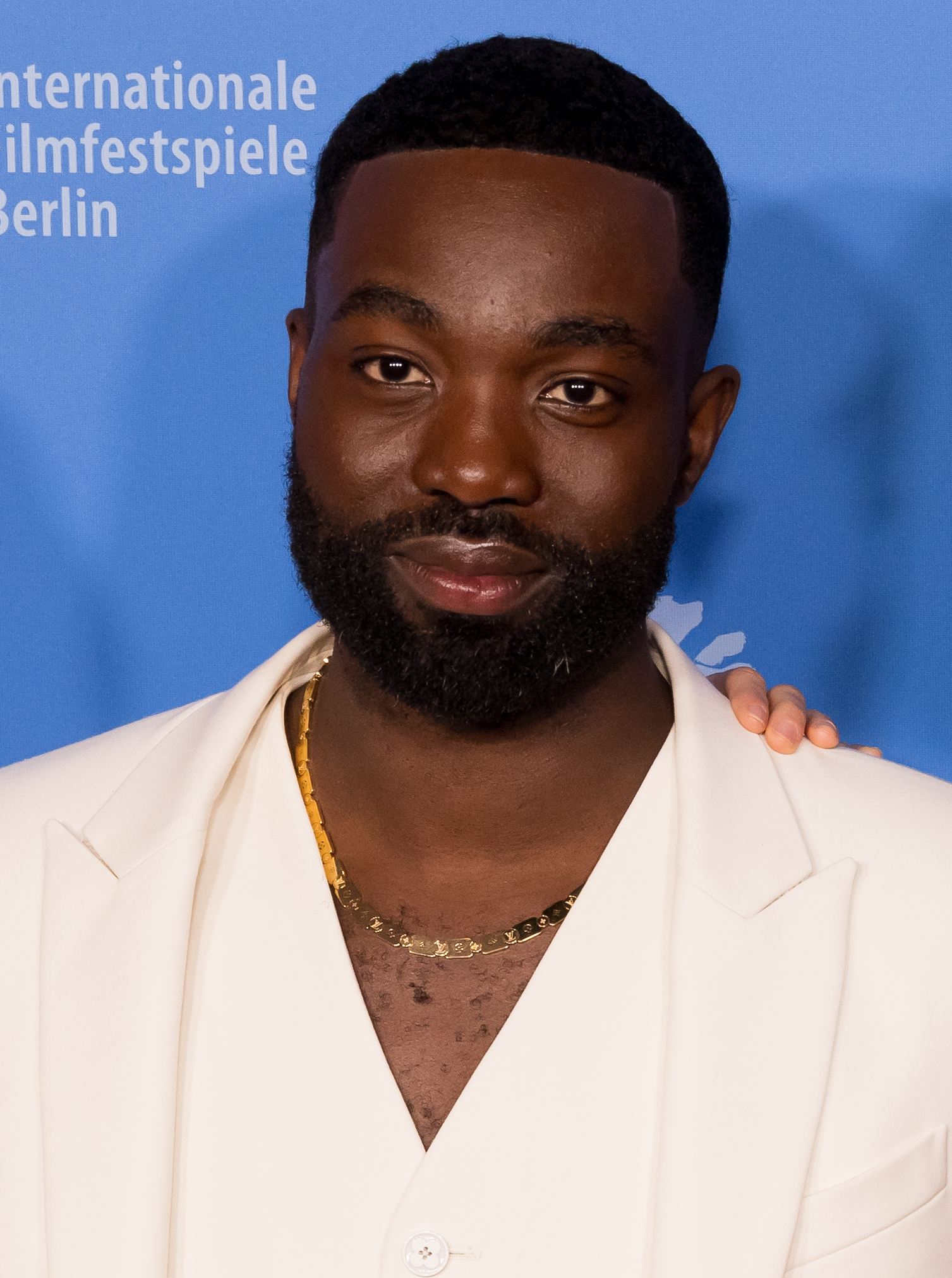
- Essiedu at the 2024 Berlinale
- Born: Paapa Kwaakye Essiedu; 11 June 1990 (age 36); Southwark, London, England
- Education: Guildhall School of Music and Drama (BA)
- Occupation: Actor
- Years active: 2012–present
- Spouse: Rosa Robson (m. 2023; div. 2026)

Paapa Kwaakye Essiedu (/ˈpɑːpə ˌɛsiˈeɪduː/; born 11 June 1990) is a British actor. Known for his performances on stage and screen, he has received numerous accolades, including a Laurence Olivier Award and an Independent Spirit Award, in addition to nominations for a British Academy Television Award and a Primetime Emmy Award.

Essiedu started his career in 2012 when he joined the Royal Shakespeare Company, acting in the productions of The Merry Wives of Windsor (2012), Hamlet (2016), and King Lear (2016). His screen breakthrough came in 2020 with his role in BBC One's I May Destroy You, earning nominations for the Primetime Emmy Award for Outstanding Supporting Actor in a Limited or Anthology Series or Movie and the British Academy Television Award for Best Actor. He portrayed George Boleyn in the Channel 5 historical drama Anne Boleyn in 2021, and had starring roles in the AMC+ action series Gangs of London (2020–2022), the science fiction series The Lazarus Project (2020–2023), and Black Mirror: Demon 79 (2023).

Essiedu made his feature film acting debut as a policeman in Kenneth Branagh's mystery film Murder on the Orient Express (2017). He took roles in the horror film Men (2022), the fantasy film Genie (2023), and the drama The Outrun (2024). He gained acclaim for his stage roles in Caryl Churchill's play A Number (2022), Lucy Prebble's play The Effect (2023–2024), and Arthur Miller's All My Sons (2026), earning the Laurence Olivier Award for Best Actor in a Supporting Role for the latter.

== Early life and education ==
Paapa Kwaakye Essiedu was born on 11 June 1990 at Guy's Hospital in Southwark, London, to Ghanaian parents, was brought up in Walthamstow, East London by his mother, a fashion and design teacher. His father Tony had returned to Ghana, where Essiedu has a half-brother and sister, and died when Essiedu was 14 years old.

Essiedu attended Forest School on a scholarship. Active in sports teams and theatrical productions growing up, he initially wanted to be a doctor. Essiedu developed an interest in Shakespeare, having been encouraged to act by his A level drama teacher at Forest, and was accepted to the Guildhall School of Music and Drama, where he met and worked with Michaela Coel. His mother died of breast cancer while he was at drama school.

== Career ==
=== 2012–2019: Early roles ===
Essiedu joined the Royal Shakespeare Company (RSC) in 2012 to play Fenton in Phillip Breen's production of The Merry Wives of Windsor. Afterwards, he joined the National Theatre, playing Burgundy and understudying Edmund in Sam Mendes' production of King Lear. When Sam Troughton lost his voice during a performance, Essiedu stepped in and played the role to critical acclaim. He appeared in Outside on the Street (Pleasance Theatre), Black Jesus (Finborough Theatre), Romeo and Juliet (Tobacco Factory), You For Me For You (Royal Court).

In 2016, Essiedu starred in the Royal Shakespeare Company productions of Hamlet as the titular role and King Lear as Edmund. The judges described Essiedu's Hamlet as one the audience listened to "completely still", observing Essiedu's performance could turn on a sixpence – sweet, playful and flirtatious one minute, and fiercely intelligent the next. "Like all great actors", a judge commented, he "made all the lines his own". His Edmund in King Lear was reported to convey a chilling contempt and cynicism. Essiedu voiced Tunde in the BBC Radio 3 drama As Innocent As You Can Get (2016) by Rex Obano, and in the BBC Radio 4 drama Wide Open Spaces the same year, in which he played the role of a man determined to overcome his agoraphobia in order to keep his promise to visit his daughter's grave on the first anniversary of her death.

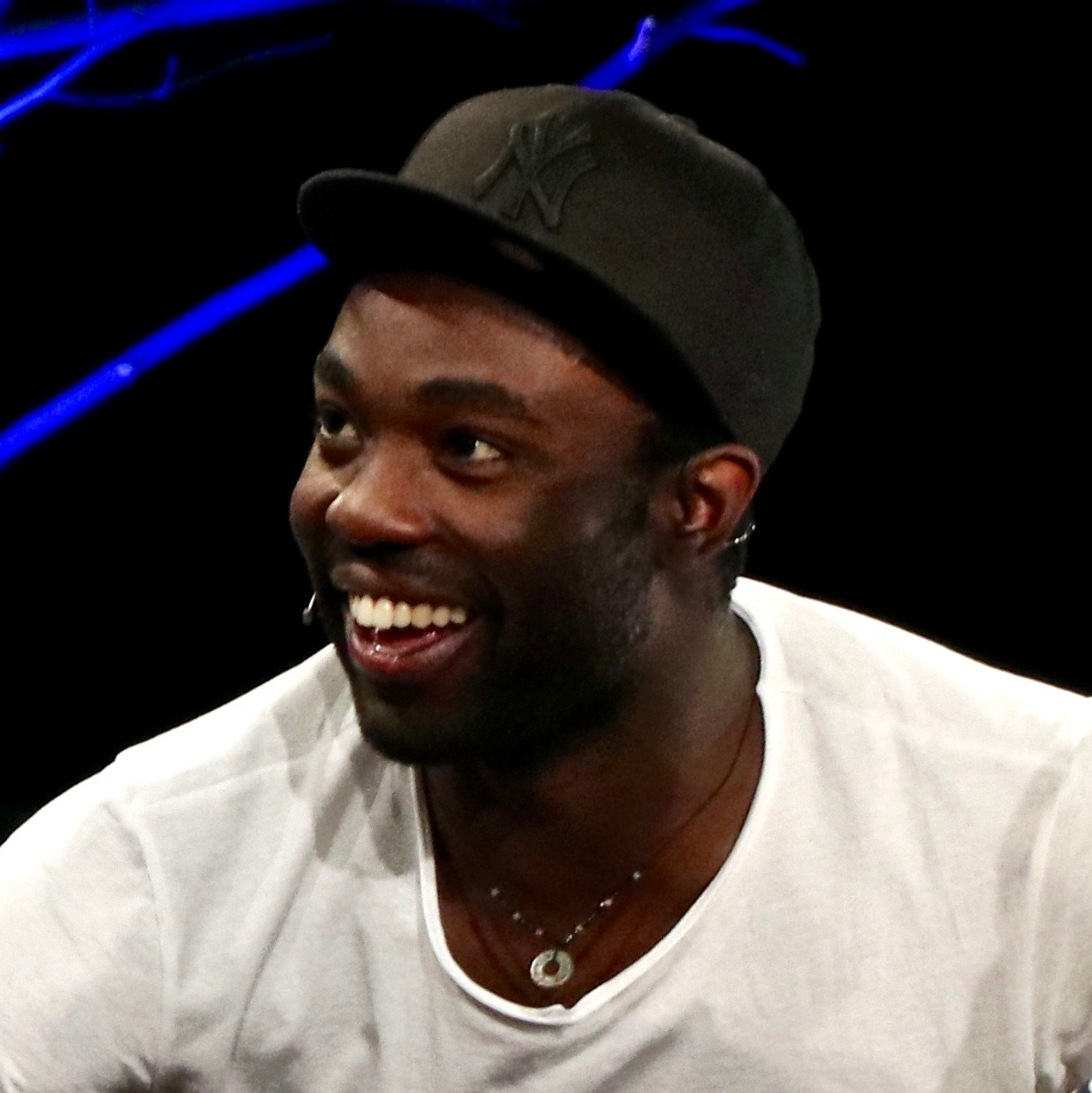
Essiedu in 2016

Essiedu began his television career with roles as Demetrius in Russell T Davies' television film adaptation of A Midsummer Night's Dream (2016), Otto in the period drama The Miniaturist (2017), Nate Akindele in the Channel 4's Kiri (2018), and Ed Washburn in the BBC One drama Press (2018). He made his feature film debut in a small role as a policeman in Kenneth Branagh's Murder on the Orient Express (2017) an adaptation of the Agatha Christie novel of the same name.

In 2019 he acted in the Danai Gurira play The Convert starring alongside Letitia Wright at the Young Vic. Time Out praised both actors' performances.

=== 2020–present ===
From 2020 to 2022, Essiedu starred as Alex Dumani in the crime drama Gangs of London on Sky Atlantic. In 2020, Essiedu portrayed Kwame in the BBC One series I May Destroy You alongside Michaela Coel. For the latter, Essiedu received critical acclaim, a number of notable nominations, including for the Primetime Emmy Award for Outstanding Supporting Actor in a Limited or Anthology Series or Movie, and the British Academy Television Award for Best Actor. The cast won Best Ensemble at the 36th Independent Spirit Awards.

Essiedu then played George Boleyn, 2nd Viscount Rochford in the three-parter Anne Boleyn starring Jodie Turner-Smith for Channel 5 in 2021.

In 2022, Essiedu returned to the theatre, playing three separate roles in the Caryl Churchill play A Number at The Old Vic, with Lennie James. Nick Curtis of The Evening Standard praised his performance, writing "Paapa Essiedu gives a tour de force performance," adding "He's subtly, devastatingly different in speech, stance and attitude." That same year Essiedu began starring in the Sky Max science fiction time loop series The Lazarus Project for which he received a British Academy Television Award for Best Actor nomination. He also appeared in Alex Garland's folk horror film Men (2022) and joined the cast of mystery thriller series The Capture on BBC One for its second series as Isaac Turner, Security Minister.

In 2023, he acted in the Black Mirror episode Demon 79 alongside Anjana Vasan. Jack King of GQ cited it as "the best Black Mirror episode in years", writing of "Essiedu's chameleonic acting abilities... not only showing himself to be one hell of a talent but one with exciting range."

He returned to the stage starring opposite Taylor Russell in the Jamie Lloyd directed revival of the Lucy Prebble play The Effect at the National Theatre in 2023 and at The Shed in 2024. He acted opposite Saoirse Ronan in the film The Outrun, which premiered at the 2024 Sundance Film Festival.

In 2025, Essiedu returned to the West End in Ivo van Hove's revival of Arthur Miller's All My Sons at Wyndham's Theatre, alongside Bryan Cranston and Marianne Jean-Baptiste. For this, Essiedu won the Laurence Olivier Award for Best Actor in a Supporting Role in 2026.

Essiedu will portray Severus Snape in the HBO television adaptation of the Harry Potter books. In March 2026, Essiedu revealed that he had received death threats and racist abuse on social media because of the casting.

== Acting credits ==
=== Film ===
| Year | Title | Role | Notes | Ref. |
|---|---|---|---|---|
| 2017 | Murder on the Orient Express | Sergeant Campbell | | |
| 2022 | Men | James | | |
| 2023 | Genie | Bernard Bottle | | |
| 2024 | The Outrun | Daynin | | |
| 2027 | The Thomas Crown Affair | TBA | | |
| TBA | The Scurry | TBA | Post-production | |
| TBA | Tyrant | TBA | Filming | |

=== Television ===
| Year | Title | Role | Notes |
|---|---|---|---|
| 2013 | Utopia | Roy | 2 episodes |
| 2015 | Not Safe For Work | Paul | 1 episode |
| 2016 | A Midsummer Night's Dream | Demetrius | Television film |
| 2017 | The Miniaturist | Otto | 3 episodes |
| 2018 | Kiri | Nate Akindele | 4 episodes |
| 2018 | Press | Ed Washburn | 6 episodes |
| 2018 | Black Earth Rising | Jaalen | Episode: "In Other News" |
| 2020–2022 | Gangs of London | Alexander "Alex" Dumani | 8 episodes |
| 2020 | I May Destroy You | Kwame | 12 episodes |
| 2021 | Anne Boleyn | George Boleyn | 3 episodes |
| 2022–2023 | The Lazarus Project | George | 16 episodes |
| 2022–2026 | The Capture | Isaac Turner | Main role (series 2 and 3) |
| 2023 | Black Mirror | Gaap | Episode: "Demon 79" |
| 2024 | Black Doves | Elmore Fitch | 2 episodes |
| 2025 | Black Mirror | Unnamed player | Episode: "USS Callister: Into Infinity" |
| 2026 | Babies | Stephen | 6 episodes |
| 2026 | Falling | David | Main cast |
| 2026–present | Harry Potter | Severus Snape | Main cast |

=== Theatre ===
| Year | Title | Role | Playwright | Notes | Ref. |
|---|---|---|---|---|---|
| 2013 | Black Jesus | Gabriel | Anders Lustgarten | Finborough Theatre, London | |
| 2014 | King Lear | Burgundy | William Shakespeare | Olivier Theatre, National Theatre | |
| 2015 | Romeo and Juliet | Romeo | William Shakespeare | Tobacco Factory, Bristol | |
| 2015 | You For Me For You | Wade | Mia Chung | Royal Court, London | |
| 2016, 2018 | Hamlet | Hamlet | William Shakespeare | Royal Shakespeare Company Tour | |
| 2016 | King Lear | Edmund | William Shakespeare | Barbican Theatre, West End | |
| 2017 | Racing Demon | Tony Ferris | David Hare | Theatre Royal, Bath | |
| 2018 | Pinter One | Various roles | Harold Pinter | Harold Pinter Theatre, West End | |
| 2019 | The Convert | Chilford | Danai Gurira | Young Vic, London | |
| 2020 | Pass Over | Moses | Antoinette Nwandu | Kiln Theatre, London | |
| 2022 | A Number | Michael / Bernard | Caryl Churchill | Old Vic Theatre | |
| 2023 | The Effect | Tristan | Lucy Prebble | National Theatre, London | |
| 2024 | The Effect | Tristan | Lucy Prebble | The Shed, New York City | |
| 2024 | Death of England: Delroy | Delroy Francis Tomlin | Clint Dyer and Roy Williams | @sohoplace, London | |
| 2025–2026 | All My Sons | Chris Keller | Arthur Miller | Wyndham's Theatre | |

== Accolades ==
| Year | Award | Category | Work | Result | Ref |
|---|---|---|---|---|---|
| 2012 | Ian Charleson Awards | | The Merry Wives of Windsor | Nominated | |
| 2016 | Ian Charleson Awards | | Hamlet, King Lear | Won | |
| 2021 | Independent Spirit Awards | Best Ensemble Cast | I May Destroy You | Won | |
| 2021 | Black Reel Awards | Outstanding Supporting Actor – TV Movie or Limited Series | I May Destroy You | Nominated | |
| 2021 | British Academy Television Awards | Best Actor | I May Destroy You | Nominated | |
| 2021 | Dorian Awards | Best Supporting TV Performance | I May Destroy You | Nominated | |
| 2021 | Primetime Emmy Awards | Outstanding Supporting Actor in a Limited Series or Movie | I May Destroy You | Nominated | |
| 2022 | Standard Theatre Awards | Best Actor | A Number | Nominated | |
| 2023 | Broadcasting Press Guild Awards | Best Actor | The Lazarus Project, The Capture, Gangs of London | Nominated | |
| 2023 | Evening Standard Theatre Awards | Best Actor | The Effect | Nominated | |
| 2024 | WhatsOnStage Awards | Best Performer in a Play | The Effect | Nominated | |
| 2024 | Drama League Awards | Distinguished Performance | The Effect | Nominated | |
| 2024 | British Academy Television Award | Best Actor | The Lazarus Project | Nominated | |
| 2025 | Laurence Olivier Awards | Best Actor | Death of England: Delroy | Nominated | |
| 2026 | Laurence Olivier Awards | Best Actor in a Supporting Role | All My Sons | Won | |

== See also ==
- List of British actors
