= Alexi Kaye Campbell =

Greek-British playwright

- Born: Alexi Komondouros; 1966 (age 59–60); Athens, Greece
- Education: Boston University; Webber Douglas Academy of Dramatic Art
- Occupation: Playwright

Alexi Kaye Campbell (born 1966) is a Greek-British playwright and actor. In 2009, his play The Pride was given the Laurence Olivier Award for Outstanding Achievement in an Affiliate Theatre.

== Personal life ==
Alexi Kaye Campbell was born Alexi Komondouros in Athens, Greece, to a Greek father and British mother. The name Campbell comes from his mother's family. He was brought up in Athens and went to Greek primary school, then Campion School and St Lawrence College, the British International schools in Athens. After graduating from Boston University with a degree in English and American Literature, Kaye Campbell went on to study acting at the Webber Douglas Academy of Dramatic Art in London.

Kaye Campbell has lived with his partner, the director Dominic Cooke since 1997.

== Career ==
=== Acting ===
Before turning to writing Kaye Campbell worked for many years as an actor. His work included seasons at the Royal Shakespeare Company (RSC) and with Oxford Stage Company, Chichester Festival Theatre, the Royal Court Theatre, Hampstead Theatre and with Shared Experience.

=== Writing ===
Alexi's first play Death in Whitbridge was performed as a rehearsed reading at the Finborough Theatre in London as part of the Vibrant Playwrights Festival.

In November 2008 Kaye Campbell's second play, The Pride, was produced for the Royal Court Theatre Upstairs for which he was awarded The Critics' Circle Prize for Most Promising Playwright and the John Whiting Award for Best New Play. The production, directed by Jamie Lloyd, was also awarded a Laurence Olivier Award for Outstanding Achievement in an affiliate theatre. It starred Bertie Carvel, JJ Feild, Lyndsey Marshal and Tim Steed.

In January 2010 The Pride transferred to America and was produced for the MCC Theater in New York City, directed by Joe Mantello. The cast included Ben Whishaw, Andrea Riseborough, Hugh Dancy and Adam James. The play won the GLAAD award for Best New Play. Since then, 'The Pride' has been produced in many theatres worldwide, including in Australia, New Zealand, Japan, South Korea, Brazil, Italy, Sweden, Belgium, Greece, and Germany.

Kaye Campbell's third play, Apologia, was produced at The Bush Theatre in the summer of 2009, directed by Josie Rourke. Apologia was short-listed for The John Whiting Award and nominated for the Writers' Guild of Great Britain award for Best Theatre Play. 'Apologia' was also produced at the MTC Theatre in Melbourne, Australia, with Robyn Nevin playing the part of Kristin. It was also produced at the Bungakuza Theatre Company in Japan.

Kaye Campbell's fourth play The Faith Machine premiered at the Royal Court Theatre in August 2011 directed by Jamie Lloyd and starring Hayley Atwell and Ian McDiarmid. It was also produced at the Bungakuza Theatre in Tokyo.

His fifth play Bracken Moor premiered at the Tricycle Theatre, London in June 2013, directed by Polly Teale.

In Autumn 2013 a revival of The Pride, directed by Jamie Lloyd, enjoyed a successful run in the West End before embarking on a national tour.

His sixth play, Sunset at the Villa Thalia, premiered at the National Theatre in London in May 2016, in a production directed by Simon Godwin and starring Ben Miles, Elizabeth McGovern, Sam Crane and Pippa Nixon.

In August 2017 a revival of Apologia was produced at The Trafalgar Studios in London, directed by Jamie Lloyd and starring Stockard Channing. In September 2018 Apologia will also be produced at the Roundabout Theatre Company in New York.

Kaye Campbell's first film script, Woman in Gold, produced by BBC Films and The Weinstein Company, was directed by Simon Curtis and stars Helen Mirren and Ryan Reynolds. It was the highest earning independent film of 2015.

Kaye Campbell's new play, Bird Grove, is set to open at the Hampstead Theatre, London, in February 2026, directed by Anna Ledwich.

== Works ==
=== Plays ===
- Death in Whitbridge (2008) – Finborough Theatre, London
- The Pride (2008) – Royal Court Theatre Upstairs, London, 2008; MCC Theater, New York, 2010; Crucible Theatre (Studio Theatre), Sheffield, 2011
- Apologia (2009) – The Bush Theatre, London, 2009; Laura Pels Theatre, NYC, 2018
- The Faith Machine (2011) – Royal Court Theatre Downstairs, London, 2011
- Bracken Moor (2013) – Shared Experience & Tricycle Theatre, London, 2013
- Sunset at the Villa Thalia (2016) National Theatre, London, 2016
- Bird Grove (2026) Hampstead Theatre, London, 2026

=== Films ===
- Woman in Gold (2015)

== Awards and nominations ==
Year	Result	Award	Category
2008	Won	Critics' Circle Theatre Award	Most Promising Playwright (The Pride)
2009	Won	John Whiting Award	Best New Play (The Pride)
2009	Won	Laurence Olivier Award	Outstanding Achievement in an affiliate theatre (The Pride)
2009	Nomination	Evening Standard Award – The Charles Wintour Award	Most Promising Playwright (The Pride)
2009	Nomination	Writers' Guild of Great Britain Awards	Best New Play (Apologia)
2010	Nomination	Drama League Award	Distinguished Production of a Play (The Pride)
2010	Nomination	Outer Critics Circle Award	Outstanding New Off-Broadway Play (The Pride)
2011	Won	GLAAD Award	Outstanding New York Theatre (The Pride)
