= Lucy Prebble =

British playwright (born 1980)

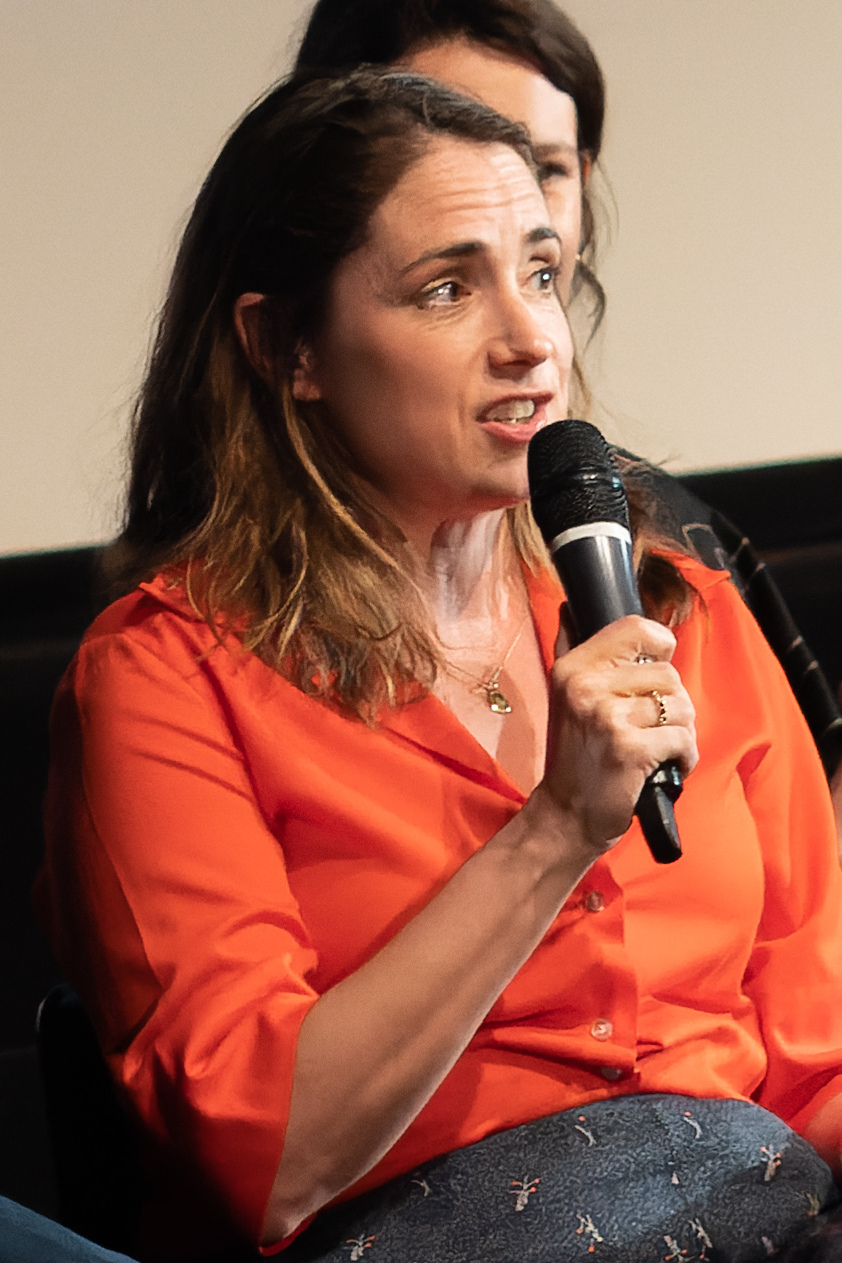
- Prebble in 2023
- Born: Lucy Ashton Prebble; 18 December 1980 (age 45); Haslemere, Surrey, England
- Education: University of Sheffield
- Occupations: Writer; producer
- Years active: 2003–present

Lucy Ashton Prebble (born 18 December 1980) is a British playwright and producer. She has received numerous accolades including three Primetime Emmy Awards as well as nominations for a BAFTA Award and two Laurence Olivier Awards.

Prebble made her professional debut as a playwright with her play The Sugar Syndrome (2003) for which she received the George Devine Award for Most Promising Playwright. She went on to write ENRON (2010) which premiered on the West End and Broadway. The play earned a nomination for the Laurence Olivier Award for Best New Play. She wrote The Effect (2012) which won the Critics' Circle Theatre Award for Best New Play. She debuted her latest play A Very Expensive Poison (2019) for which she received another Laurence Olivier Award for Best New Play nomination.

For television, she created the ITV2 series Secret Diary of a Call Girl (2007–2011) and co-created the Sky Atlantic series I Hate Suzie (2020–2022) with her close friend Billie Piper. From 2018 to 2023 she served as a writer and an executive producer on the acclaimed HBO drama series Succession, for which she received three Primetime Emmy Award for Outstanding Drama Series.

== Early life and education ==
Prebble grew up in Haslemere, Surrey, and was educated at St Hilary's School, Godalming, and Guildford High School. Her mother was a school bursar and her father was a businessman. Her paternal grandfather was a butler and her paternal grandmother was a maid at a castle in Aberdeenshire, Scotland. While studying English at the University of Sheffield, Prebble wrote a short play called Liquid, which won the PMA Most Promising Playwright Award. She received the Distinguished Alumni Award in 2014.

== Career ==
=== Theatre ===
==== 2003–2010: Early works ====
Prebble's first full-length play The Sugar Syndrome was performed at the Royal Court in 2003 and won her the George Devine Award, followed by the TMA Award for Best New Play in October 2004. Matt Wolf of Variety compared the play to Paula Vogel's How I Learned to Drive and added "And yet, even as you're anticipating [the play's] every gear change...Prebble lifts yet another lid on the varieties of bruises, physical and emotional, that link her four characters. And Prebble chronicles with great skill the way in which parents and children often have the goods on each other, in this case the revelation of Jan's husband's adultery — which turns out not to be any revelation at all."

Her next theatre project ENRON, was based on the financial scandal and collapse of the American energy corporation of the same name. It was produced by theatre company Headlong at the Chichester Festival Theatre in 2009, under the direction of Rupert Goold. The production transferred first to the Royal Court and subsequently to the Noël Coward Theatre. The play earned Prebble an Olivier Award nomination for Best New Play. The production's Broadway transfer opened at the Broadhurst Theatre in April 2010 but failed to match the critical acclaim it received in the UK and closed the following month. The Associated Press wrote of the production, "Playwright Prebble and director Rupert Goold attempt to walk a fine line in the production, which is alternately naturalistic and highly stylized in its depiction of the rise and fall of the mammoth energy company that engaged in accounting fraud on an unprecedented level."

==== 2012–present: Breakthrough and acclaim ====
The Effect, a study of love and neuroscience, premiered at the National Theatre in 2012, won the 2012 Critics' Circle Award for Best Play. The Effect premiered in the US Off-Broadway at the Barrow Street Theatre on 2 March 2016, directed by David Cromer, and featuring Kati Brazda, Susannah Flood, Carter Hudson and Steve Key. In 2019, it was listed in The Independent as one of the 40 most "continually rewarding" plays. In April 2017 it was announced that Prebble was working on a new play, based on Bizet's Carmen, from the new Bridge Theatre in London.

In October 2018, London's Old Vic announced Prebble's A Very Expensive Poison, a stage adaptation of Luke Harding's non-fiction book of the same name. The play is about the assassination of Alexander Litvinenko by means of the invisible radioactive isotope polonium-210. The play opened at the Old Vic on 5 September 2019, directed by John Crowley. A Very Expensive Poison was nominated at the 2020 Laurence Olivier Awards for Best New Play and won the Critics' Circle Theatre Award for Best New Play and Best New Production of a Play at the Broadway World Awards. Prebble was also awarded the 2020 Susan Smith Blackburn Prize.

Her play The Effect had a revival in 2023 at the Royal National Theatre's Lyttelton Theatre in the West End before transferring to The Shed in New York City in 2024. The production was directed by Jamie Lloyd and stars Taylor Russell and Paapa Essiedu. Kate Wyver praised the production describing at "intense and intoxicating" adding, "[the play] remains an intellectually and physically intense experience, with subtle edits that sharpen and freshen the text for a stellar new cast".

=== Television ===
==== 2007–2017: Secret Diary of a Call Girl ====
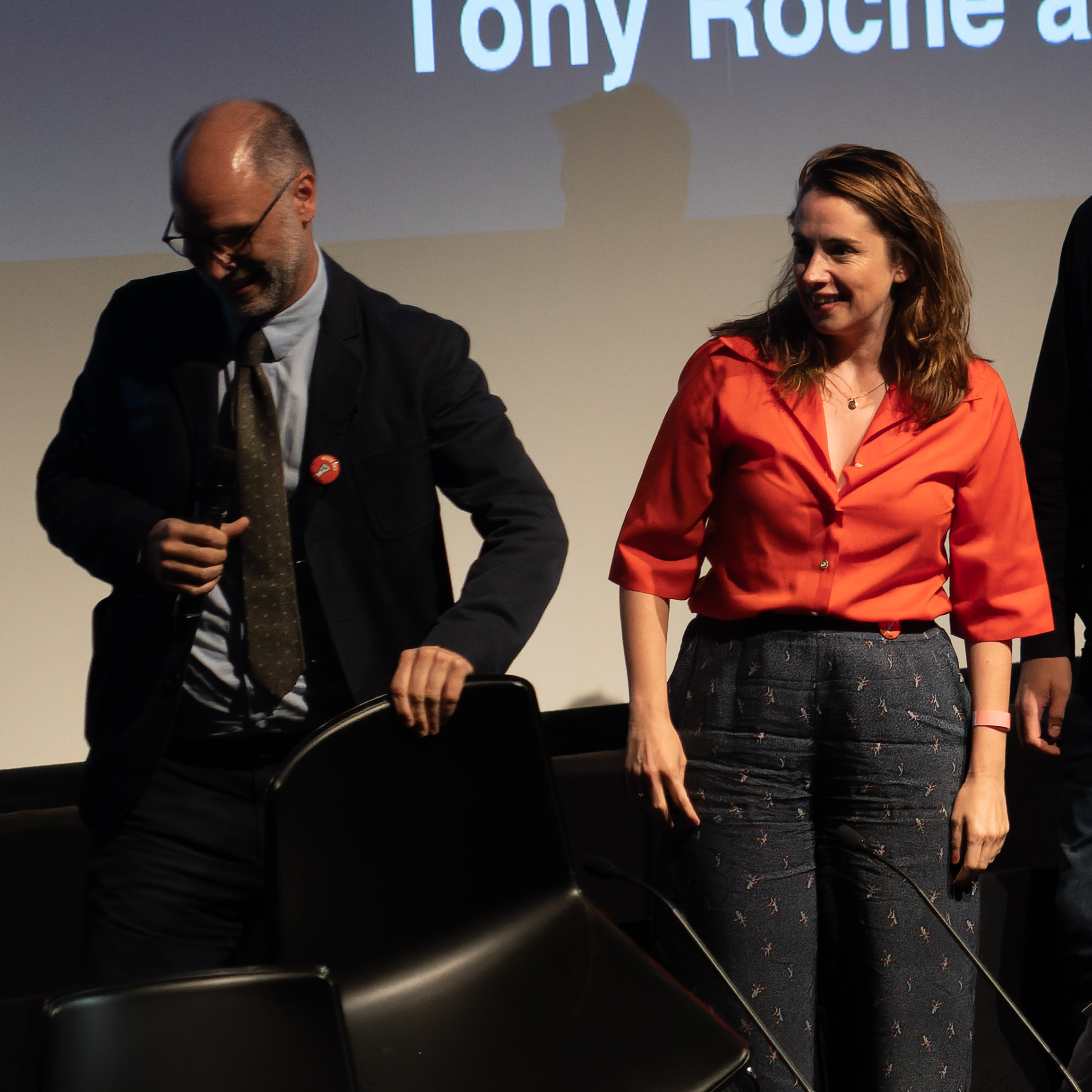
Prebble with Jesse Armstrong at the Succession finale screening at BFI Southbank in 2023

Prebble wrote her first television series, the ITV2 drama-comedy series Secret Diary of a Call Girl based on the novel, The Intimate Adventures of a London Call Girl by Brooke Magnanti. Set in modern-day London, the show revolves around a young woman, Hannah Baxter, played by Billie Piper who lives a secret life as a call girl. The series received positive reviews with Nancy Franklin of The New Yorker comparing the series favorably to Sex and the City writing, "The show also uses London in somewhat the same way “Sex and the City” used New York—we see a lot of bright lights, fancy restaurants, and expensive apartments—though there is a sadder, more wistful quality to the photography here". Prebble wrote for the first two of the show's four seasons, the last of which concluded in March 2011.

Prebble has also appeared as a guest on Frankie Boyle's New World Order and Have I Got News for You. Prebble contributes to major publications as a journalist and wrote a weekly Tech column for The Observer newspaper. She was the Head Scene Writer for Bungie's first person shooter video game, Destiny, which was released in September 2014. Prebble was hired in 2016 to write and executive produced a pilot for Sarah Silverman for HBO.

==== 2018–2023: I Hate Suzie and Succession ====
From 2018 to 2023, Lucy served as a co-executive producer and writer on the acclaimed HBO drama Succession starring Brian Cox, Jeremy Strong, Sarah Snook, Kieran Culkin, and Matthew Macfadyen. The show revolved around the fictional Roy family, loosely based on the Murdoch family, each struggling to take power of the Family owned media company. The series received numerous accolades including several Golden Globe Awards and Primetime Emmy Awards. As a producer she won the Primetime Emmy Award for Outstanding Drama Series in 2020, 2022, and 2023. Prebble also won the Writers Guild of America Award for Television: Dramatic Series twice in 2019 and 2021. Prebble wrote two episodes of the series herself, the first one being "Austerlitz" (2018) from season 1. Scott Tobias of Vulture praised the episode writing, "it's such a great opportunity to get to know the significant others in the Roys' lives and see how they interact with their mates — and, hilariously, with each other". She wrote her second episode "Honeymoon States" (2023) from season 4. Alan Sepinwall of Rolling Stone praised the episode for its examination of the characters' greed in the wake of tragedy, and called the episode overall "sharp and funny" Noel Murray of The New York Times hailed the episode "one of the funniest of the series, filled with quotable lines and sick burns".

In 2020 Prebble reunited with Piper for a further television project, the comedy-drama series I Hate Suzie for Sky Atlantic. The series followed Piper as a former teenage pop star and television actress. The series had a second season in 2022 entitled, I Hate Suzie Too. The series received critical acclaim ending up on several best of lists. Lucy Mangan of The Guardian praised the collaboration between Prebble and Piper, calling the show a "wild ride that feels like an absolute gift." The series received four British Academy Television Award nominations as well as a win for Prebble for the Royal Television Society Programme Award for Best Writing in a Drama Series in 2023.

== Recognition ==
In June 2018 Prebble was elected Fellow of the Royal Society of Literature in its "40 Under 40" initiative. She was also the recipient of the 2019 Wellcome Screenwriting Fellowship.

== Works ==
=== Theatre ===
Year	Title	Venue	Ref.
2002	Liquid		
2003	The Sugar Syndrome	Jerwood Theatre Upstairs, London	
2009	ENRON	Noël Coward Theatre, London	
2010	ENRON	Broadhurst Theatre, New York City	
2012	The Effect	National Theatre	
2016	The Effect	Barrow Street Theatre, New York City	
2024	The Effect	The Shed, New York City	
2019	A Very Expensive Poison	Old Vic Theatre, London	

=== Television ===
Year	Title	Writer	Producer	Notes	Ref.
2007–2011	Secret Diary of a Call Girl	Yes	No	Also creator; 7 episodes	
2016	Untitled Sarah Silverman Project	Yes	Executive	Television pilot	
2018–2023	Succession	Yes	Executive	Writer: "Austerlitz"; "Honeymoon States"; Also producer; 38 episodes	
2020–2022	I Hate Suzie	Yes	Executive	11 episodes	
2024	The Effect	Yes	No	National Theatre Live special	

== Awards and nominations ==
Year	Award	Category	Work	Result	Ref.
2003	Critics' Circle Theatre Award	Most Promising Playwright	The Sugar Syndrome	Won	
2003	Evening Standard Theatre Award	Most Promising Playwright	The Sugar Syndrome	Nominated	
2004	Susan Smith Blackburn Prize		The Sugar Syndrome	Nominated	
2009	Evening Standard Theatre Award	Best Play	ENRON	Nominated	
2010	Laurence Olivier Award	Best New Play	ENRON	Nominated	
2010	Drama League Award	Distinguished Production of a Play	ENRON	Nominated	
2010	Susan Smith Blackburn Prize		ENRON	Nominated	
2010	Tony Award	Best Original Score	ENRON	Nominated	
2012	Critics' Circle Theatre Award	Best New Play	The Effect	Won	
2013	Evening Standard Theatre Award	Best Play	The Effect	Nominated	
2014	Susan Smith Blackburn Prize		The Effect	Nominated	
2019	Critics' Circle Theatre Award	Best New Play	A Very Expensive Poison	Won	
2020	Laurence Olivier Award	Best New Play	A Very Expensive Poison	Nominated	
2020	Susan Smith Blackburn Prize		A Very Expensive Poison	Won	
2019	Primetime Emmy Awards	Outstanding Drama Series	Succession	Nominated	
2020	Primetime Emmy Awards	Outstanding Drama Series	Succession	Won	
2022	Primetime Emmy Awards	Outstanding Drama Series	Succession	Won	
2023	Primetime Emmy Awards	Outstanding Drama Series	Succession	Won	
2025	Primetime Emmy Awards	Outstanding Television Movie	Mountainhead	Nominated	
2021	BAFTA TV Award	Best Drama Series	I Hate Suzie	Nominated	
2024	Laurence Olivier Award	Best Revival	The Effect	Nominated	

== See also ==
- List of British playwrights since 1950
