= The Scurry =

British comedy horror film

- Directed by: Craig Roberts
- Screenplay by: Tim Telling
- Produced by: James Swarbrick; Adrian Bate
- Starring: Ella Purnell; Rhys Ifans; Paapa Essiedu; Antonia Thomas
- Production companies: True Brit Entertainment; Water & Power Productions; Cliff Edge Pictures; Circus Studios
- Country: United Kingdom
- Language: English

The Scurry is an upcoming British comedy horror film directed by Craig Roberts and starring Ella Purnell, Rhys Ifans, Paapa Essiedu, and Antonia Thomas.

== Premise ==
A gang of killer squirrels run amok in a park.

== Cast ==
- Ella Purnell
- Rhys Ifans
- Paapa Essiedu
- Antonia Thomas
- Beau Gadsdon
- Daniel Mays
- Leah Harvey
- John Macmillan
- Molly Cartwright

== Production ==
The screenplay is from Tim Telling and the film is directed by Craig Roberts. Water & Power Productions, Cliff Edge Pictures and Circus Studios are producing the project The film is co-produced by True Brit Entertainment. Producers are James Swarbrick for Water & Power and Adrian Bate for Cliff Edge.

The cast reported in March 2024 included Rhys Ifans, Olivia Cooke, Paapa Essiedu, Mia Mckenna-Bruce and Antonia Thomas. Cooke and McKenna-Bruce left the project due to scheduling conflicts and Ella Purnell joined the cast.

Principal photography took place on location and at Dragon Studios in Bridgend, South Wales in April and May 2024.
