= The Pride (play) =

Play by Alexi Kaye Campbell

- Original language: English
- Written by: Alexi Kaye Campbell
- Characters: 3 male, 1 female (all doubling)
- Genre: Drama

Premiere
- Date: 2008
- Place: Royal Court Theatre, London

The Pride is a British drama by Alexi Kaye Campbell that counterpoints two parallel love stories.

== Productions ==
In 2008 The Pride premiered at the Royal Court Theatre to critical acclaim, winning the Laurence Olivier Award under the direction of Jamie Lloyd and starring Bertie Carvel, JJ Feild and Lyndsey Marshal.

It made its US premiere Off-broadway in the MCC Theater production at the Lucille Lortel Theatre in February 2010 starring Hugh Dancy, Andrea Riseborough and Ben Whishaw and directed by Joe Mantello. The play was nominated for the 2010 Drama League Award, Outstanding Production of a Play and 2010 Outer Critics Circle Award, Outstanding New Off-Broadway Play.

In 2011, the play made its Japanese premiere in Theatre Project Tokyo production at d-soko theatre in Tokyo, starring Takamasa Suga, Erika Mabuchi, Makiya Yamaguchi and Ayumi Tanida, directed by Eriko Ogawa.

In 2012 The Pride made its Australian debut at Red Stitch Actors Theatre, starring Lyall Brooks, Ben Geurens and Ngaire Dawn Fair under Gary Abrahams' direction.

The play was revived in London at Trafalgar Studios in 2013.

The play was produced in Seoul, South Korea at the Art One Theater in 2014, directed by Kim Dong-yeon.

On 27 June 2022, Ambassador Theatre Group produced a one-off script in hand performance of The Pride at the Fortune Theatre starring Omari Douglas, Jordan Luke Gage, Lauryn Redding, Daniel Bailey, Michelle Tiwo and Josh-Susan Enright. The performance celebrated 50 years since the UK's first gay pride rally.

== Cast and characters ==
Character	Original Cast, 2008	Original New York Cast, 2010	Original Australian Cast, 2012	Revival London Cast, 2013	Original Korean Cast, 2014	London Anniversary Cast, 2022
Director	Jamie Lloyd	Joe Mantello	Gary Abrahams	Jamie Lloyd	Kim Dong-yeon	Aran Cherkez
Philip	J. J. Feild	Hugh Dancy	Lyall Brooks	Harry Hadden-Paton	Lee Myung-haeng; Jung Sang-yun	Jordan Luke Gage
Oliver	Bertie Carvel	Ben Whishaw	Ben Geurens	Al Weaver	Oh Jong-hyuk; Park Eun-suk	Omari Douglas
Sylvia	Lyndsey Marshal	Andrea Riseborough	Ngaire Dawn Fair	Hayley Atwell	Kim So-jin; Kim Ji-hyun	Lauryn Redding
The Man/Peter/The Doctor	Tim Steed	Adam James	Ben Prendergast	Mathew Horne	Kim Jong-gu; Choi Dae-hun	Daniel Bailey; Josh-Susan Enright; Michelle Tiwo
