= The Sugar Syndrome =

2003 play by Lucy Prebble

- Methuen Drama cover
- Original language: English
- Written by: Lucy Prebble
- Genre: Drama
- Setting: London, early 2000s

Premiere
- Date: 15 April 2003
- Place: Royal Court Theatre, London

The Sugar Syndrome is a 2003 play written by British writer Lucy Prebble. It has won several awards and as of 2009 has been sold in seven languages.

== Synopsis ==
The play has four main characters: Dani, Tim, Lewis and Jan. At the beginning, Dani (short for Danielle), a girl of seventeen, has just come home after spending some time in a clinic for eating disorders. Her mother, Jan, is trying to cope with the problems of looking after Dani after separating from her husband. Dani starts talking to people in an internet chat room and gets to know Tim, a man in his thirties. Dani pretends to be an eleven-year-old boy, which Tim believes. Tim is a man in his thirties who has a taste for young boys and has spent some time in prison. He and Dani agree to meet in a park and subsequently become friends.

Dani also meets a lonely young man called Lewis in the chat room. Lewis eventually becomes jealous of the friendship between Dani and Tim and threatens to expose Tim as a pedophile. Tim, anticipating a visit from the police, lends his laptop to Dani for safekeeping. Dani then finds a video on the laptop which appears to depict the rape of a young boy. The play climactically ends with the harrowing sound of the boy being raped.

== Productions ==
The play premiered at the Royal Court Theatre Upstairs, London, from 16 October to 15 November 2003. Directed by Marianne Elliott, (associate director at the Royal Court Theatre), the cast featured Will Ash (Lewis), Kate Duchene (Jan), Stephanie Leonidas (Dani) and Andrew Woodall (Tim).

The play had its US premiere at the Williamstown Theatre Festival, running from 27 July to 7 August, 2005. Directed by Maria Mileaf, the cast featured Gaby Hoffmann as Dani.

In 2020 a new production was staged at the Orange Tree Theatre in Richmond upon Thames in the UK, directed by Oscar Toeman, with John Hollingsworth as Tim, Jessica Rhodes as Dani, Ali Barouti as Lewis and Alexandra Gilbreath as Jan. Peter Mason, reviewing the production in the Morning Star newspaper, said: "While the play itself is electrifying, the acting from the outstanding cast of four generates its own static charge, creating an atmosphere that occasionally makes the hair stand on end."

== Critical response ==
The CurtainUp reviewer wrote: "Ms Prebble weaves her plot with originality and an excellent ear for dialogue. … This is an outstanding first play … ."

The Times reviewer wrote: "Prebble's play is excellently wrought, and courageous in its engagement with taboo."

The British Theatre Guide reviewer wrote: "Some of the motivations are a little awry and Lucy Prebble tries to put too many complications into her first play. Despite this, she writes well, with great humour and compassion and creates interesting characters about whom it is easy to care."

The Independent reviewer wrote: "The Sugar Syndrome [is a] remarkably assured, funny and perceptive debut play by twenty-two-year-old Lucy Prebble."

== Awards ==
- The Critics' Circle Award, 2004
- George Devine Award for Most Promising Playwright, 2004
- TMA Award for Best New Play, 2004
