= Life of Crime (TV series) =

- Genre: Crime drama
- Created by: Declan Croghan
- Written by: Declan Croghan
- Directed by: Jim Loach
- Starring: Hayley Atwell; Richard Coyle; Julian Lewis Jones; Con O'Neill; Joel Beckett; Ray Panthaki
- Composer: Ray Harman
- Country of origin: United Kingdom
- Original language: English
- No. of series: 1
- No. of episodes: 3

Production
- Executive producers: James Flynn; Douglas Rae
- Producer: Emma Kingsman-Lloyd
- Running time: 60 mins. (w/ advertisements)
- Production company: ITV Studios

Original release
- Network: ITV
- Release: 10 May – 24 May 2013

Life of Crime is a British television crime drama series first broadcast on ITV in May 2013. Declining ratings across the series resulted in a second run not being commissioned; the series was however received well by critics and viewers.

The complete series was released on DVD on 27 April 2015.

== Cast ==
- Hayley Atwell as WPC/DI/DCI Denise Woods
- Richard Coyle as DS Ray Deans
- Julian Lewis Jones as Mike Holland
- Con O'Neill as DCI Ferguson
- Joel Beckett as DI Gainham
- Ray Panthaki as DS Nabeel Kothari
- Amanda Drew as Beverley Reid
- Lara Rossi as DC Jay Tomlin
- Ruth McCabe as Rose Woods

== Episode list ==
No.	Title	Directed by	Written by	Original release date	UK viewers (millions)
1	"Episode 1"	Jim Loach	Declan Croghan	10 May 2013	4.38m
2	"Episode 2"	Jim Loach	Declan Croghan	17 May 2013	3.53m
3	"Episode 3"	Jim Loach	Declan Croghan	24 May 2013	2.96m
