= The Effect =

2012 play by Lucy Prebble

- Original language: English
- Written by: Lucy Prebble
- Characters: Connie; Tristan; Dr. Lorna James; Dr. Toby Sealey
- Subject: Two people agree to volunteer in a clinical drug trial where they fall in love.
- Genre: Romance, drama

Premiere
- Date: 1 November 2012

The Effect is a play by the British playwright Lucy Prebble. The story revolves around two protagonists, Connie and Tristan, who volunteer in a clinical drug trial, where they start to fall in love. Their relationship throws the trial off-course.

It received its premiere at the Royal National Theatre's Cottesloe Theatre in London in November 2012, and starred Billie Piper and Jonjo O'Neill. A revival production played at the National's Lyttelton Theatre in London in 2023, and later transferred to The Shed in New York City in 2024.

== Synopsis ==
Tristan and Connie each agree to volunteer in a clinical drug trial, where they start to fall in love. What they are not sure of is whether their newfound passion is instinctive or a by‑product of dopamine. Thus, the two throw the trial off course, much to the frustration of the clinicians involved.

== Cast and characters ==
Character	London	Off-Broadway	London Revival	Off-Broadway Revival	Hamburg	Chula Vista
Character	2012	2016	2023	2024	2024	2025
Connie	Billie Piper	Susannah Flood	Taylor Russell	Taylor Russell	Kristina-Maria Peters	Kimberly Weinberger
Tristan	Jonjo O'Neill	Carter Hudson	Paapa Essiedu	Paapa Essiedu	Steffen Siegmund	Alex Chernow
Dr. Lorna James	Anastasia Hille	Kati Brazda	Michele Austin	Michele Austin	Cathérine Seifert	Nicki Barnes
Dr. Toby Sealey	Tom Goodman-Hill	Steve Key	Kobna Holdbrook-Smith	Kobna Holdbrook-Smith	Tim Porath	Chris Tenney

== Production history ==
=== 2012 National Theatre ===
The Effect, a The National Theatre and Headlong co-production, opened at the National's Cottesloe Theatre on 13 November 2012. Directed by Rupert Goold, who also directed Prebble's previous play Enron, the cast featured Billie Piper as Connie, Jonjo O'Neill as Tristan, Anastasia Hille as Dr James and Tom Goodman-Hill as Toby. Further creatives were Designer Miriam Buether, Lighting Designer Jon Clark, Musical Direction Sarah Angliss, Sound Designer Christopher Shutt and Projection Designer Jon Driscoll.

=== 2020 cancelled revival ===
A revival of the play was planned at the Boulevard Theatre London in March 2020 with Anthony Neilson directing and featuring Eric Kofi-Abrefa as Tristan, Christine Entwisle as Dr James, Tim McMullan as Toby and Kate O'Flynn as Connie. Due to the COVID-19 pandemic in the United Kingdom the play was postponed.

=== 2023 revival ===
A revival was eventually staged at the National's Lyttelton Theatre, opening on 1 August 2023. Directed by Jamie Lloyd, the cast featured Taylor Russell as Connie, Paapa Essiedu as Tristan, Michele Austin as Dr Lorna James and Kobna Holdbrook-Smith as Toby. Further creatives were Set and Costume Designer Soutra Gilmour, Lighting Designer Jon Clark, Composer Michael 'Mikey J' Asante and Sound Designer George Dennis. In 2024, the production transferred to New York City's The Shed with dates from 3 to 31 March.

=== 2025 revival ===
The OnStage Playhouse staged a 4-week revival, opening September 2025. It was directed by James P. Darvas and starred Kimberly Weinberger as Connie, Alex Chernow as Tristan, Nicki Barnes as Dr. Lorna James, and Chris Tenney as Dr. Toby Sealey.

== Reception ==
Charles Spencer from The Telegraph wrote that "Lucy Prebble is a playwright blessed with an exceptionally fine mind [. . .] the play struck me as being both wise and sane, raising more questions than it answers, to be sure, but that seems a sign of integrity in a work dealing with such a complex subject. But what makes The Effect so special, is that as well as being a play of ideas, it is also deeply moving, both in its depiction of the giddy wonder of love, and also in its account of the terrifying wasteland of depression itself. ... The Effect is an astonishingly rich and rewarding play, as intelligent as it is deeply felt." Paul Taylor from The Independent observed, "This four-hander brings the author's agile wit, intellectual penetration and a fresh, deeply affecting empathy to bear on a fundamentally much more complex topic than finance: brain chemistry and what it can – and cannot – tell us about the causes of severe depression and the experience of being in love. ... This is a provocative and challenging play ... it ends in edgy gesture of good sense that made me feel like cheering."

== Awards and nominations ==
=== Original West End production ===
Year	Award	Category	Nominee	Result	Ref.
2012	Critics' Circle Theatre Award	Best New Play	–	Won	
2013	Laurence Olivier Award	Best Actress	Billie Piper	Nominated	
2013	Laurence Olivier Award	Best Actress in a Supporting Role	Anastasia Hille	Nominated	
2013	Evening Standard Theatre Awards	Best Play	–	Nominated	
2013	Evening Standard Theatre Awards	Best Actress	Billie Piper	Nominated	
2013	Susan Smith Blackburn Prize	–	Lucy Prebble	Nominated	

=== 2023 West End revival ===
Year	Award	Category	Nominee	Result	Ref.
2024	Laurence Olivier Award	Best Revival	Lucy Prebble	Nominated	

=== 2024 Off-Broadway revival ===
Year	Award	Category	Nominee	Result	Ref.
2024	Drama League Awards	Outstanding Revival of a Play	The Effect	Nominated	
2024	Drama League Awards	Outstanding Direction of a Play	Jamie Lloyd	Nominated	
2024	Drama League Awards	Distinguished Performance	Paapa Essiedu	Nominated	
