= Hayley Atwell =

English and American actress

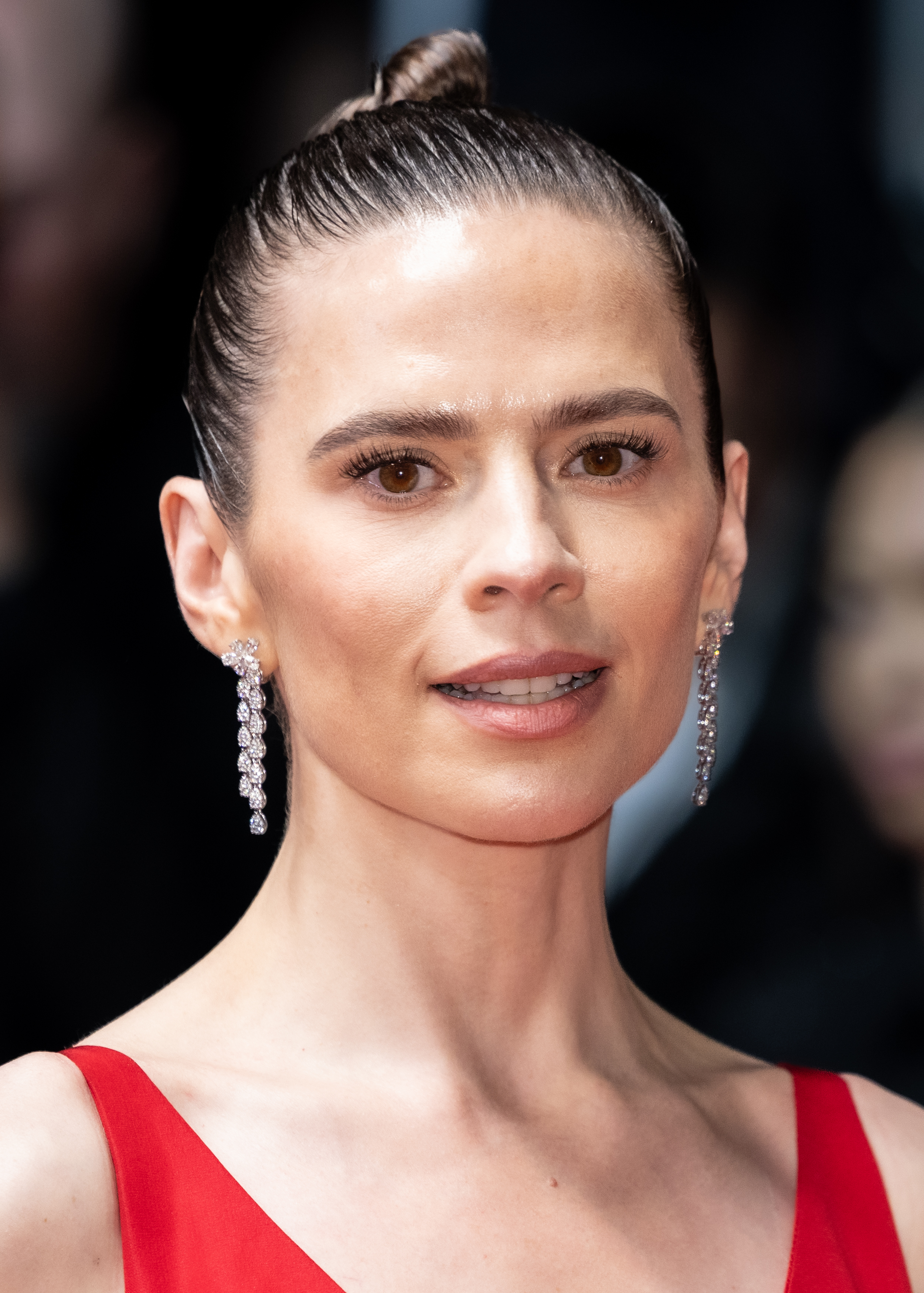
- Atwell at the 2025 Cannes Film Festival
- Born: Hayley Elizabeth Atwell; 5 April 1982 (age 44); London, England
- Citizenship: United Kingdom; United States
- Education: Guildhall School of Music and Drama (BA)
- Occupation: Actress
- Years active: 2005–present
- Spouse: Ned Wolfgang Kelly (m. 2023)
- Children: 1
- Awards: Ian Charleson Commendation

Hayley Elizabeth Atwell (born 5 April 1982) is an English and American actress. After appearing in various West End productions, Atwell gained popularity for her roles in period dramas, appearing in the films Brideshead Revisited (2008), The Duchess (2008) and the miniseries The Pillars of the Earth (2010); for the latter two, she was nominated for a British Independent Film Award and a Golden Globe Award, respectively.

Atwell rose to prominence with her portrayal of Agent Peggy Carter in the Marvel Cinematic Universe film Captain America: The First Avenger (2011), a role she reprised in later productions such as the ABC television series Agent Carter (2015–2016). Atwell also starred in the fantasy films Cinderella (2015), Christopher Robin (2018) and Peter Rabbit 2: The Runaway (2021), and had a leading role in the action films Mission: Impossible – Dead Reckoning (2023) and Mission: Impossible – The Final Reckoning (2025). For her work on stage, Atwell has received Laurence Olivier Award nominations for her leading performances in The Pride (2013) and Rosmersholm (2020).

== Early life ==
Hayley Elizabeth Atwell was born on 5 April 1982 in London, the only child of Allison Cain, who is English, and Grant Atwell, an American photographer from Kansas City, Missouri. Atwell has dual citizenship.

After attending Sion-Manning Catholic Girls' School in London, she took her A-Levels at the London Oratory School.

Atwell took two years off to travel with her father and work for a casting director. She then enrolled at the Guildhall School of Music and Drama, where she trained for three years, graduating in 2005 with a bachelor's degree in acting.

== Career ==
=== 2005–2009: Early roles and breakthrough ===
Atwell made her professional stage debut in Prometheus Bound (2005) at the Sound Theatre in London, portraying Io, a maiden exiled by Zeus. Her role received positive reviews with the British Theatre Guide praising her performance, writing that she "makes us respond to the anguish without for a moment inviting a chuckle at her bandaged hands". In 2006, she starred as the protagonist's wife, Bianca, in Women Beware Women at the Royal Shakespeare Company. The Guardian praised Atwell for projecting "the right seductive beauty".

Atwell appeared in two productions from 2007 to 2008 at the Royal National Theatre, both directed by Nicholas Hytner: Man of Mode and Major Barbara. In the former, she portrayed Belinda, a SoHo PR worker and for the latter, she received an Ian Charleson Commendation.

Atwell made the transition to film roles with her first major role coming in Woody Allen's 2007 film Cassandra's Dream, playing stage actress Angela Stark. In 2008, she also appeared in The Duchess, which earned her a Best Supporting Actress nomination at the British Independent Film Awards. Later that year, Atwell appeared in the Miramax film Brideshead Revisited.

In 2009, Atwell made her West End debut as Catherine, the adopted niece in a troubled household, in Lindsay Posner's A View From the Bridge. Variety praised her for having an "ideal freshness" and girlishness while still able to shift into uncontrolled rage; her performance was later nominated for an Olivier Award. Later in the year, Atwell appeared as '415' in AMC Television's November 2009 miniseries The Prisoner, a remake of the 1967–68 series by the same name.

=== 2010–2016: Established actress and the Marvel Cinematic Universe ===
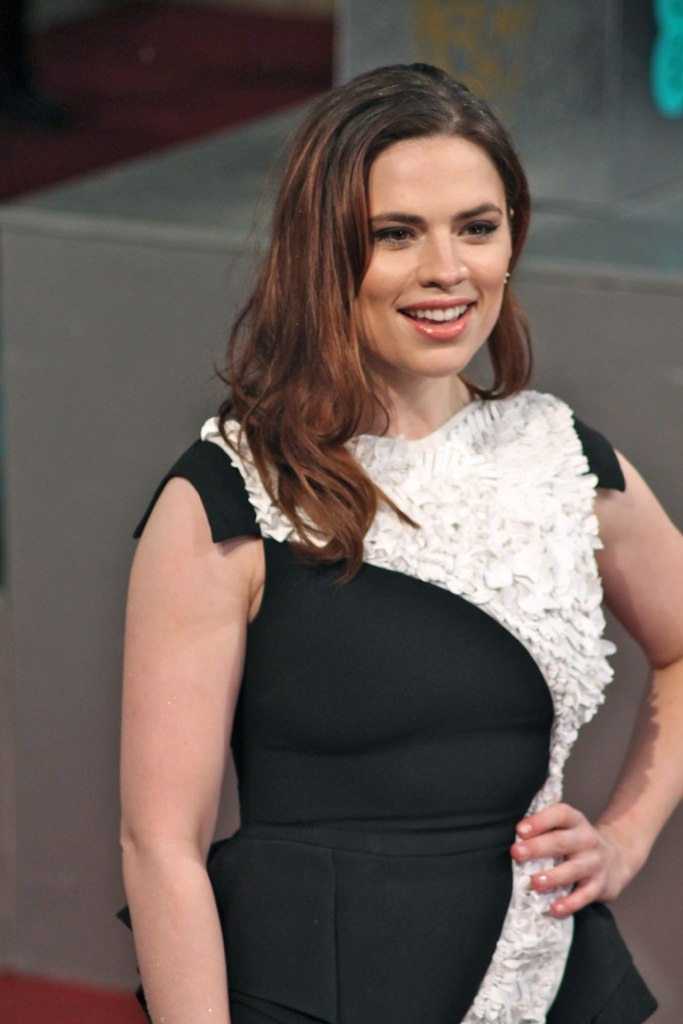
Atwell at the 66th British Academy Film Awards in 2013

In 2010 Atwell appeared in Channel 4's adaptation of William Boyd's Any Human Heart, and later that year, Ken Follett's miniseries Pillars of the Earth for which she received a Golden Globe Award nomination.

In April 2010, Atwell was cast as the love interest in a then-forthcoming film about Captain America as part of the Marvel Cinematic Universe. She first starred as Peggy Carter in the 2011 American superhero film Captain America: The First Avenger. MTV Networks' NextMovie.com named her one of the "Breakout Stars to Watch for in 2011". She also voiced Carter in the 2011 video game Captain America: Super Soldier. Following a short break from the theatre, Atwell later starred in Alexi Kaye Campbell's 2011 production of The Faith Machine, directed by Jamie Lloyd at the Royal Court Theatre.

In 2013, Atwell starred in BBC Two's adaptation of William Boyd's espionage novel, Restless. In February of that year, she also starred in "Be Right Back", an episode in Charlie Brooker's critically acclaimed science fiction television series Black Mirror. Atwell received critical praise, with critics deeming her performance one of the best of the series. That same year, Atwell also worked with Alexi Kaye Campbell and Jamie Lloyd again in a revival of The Pride at Trafalgar Studios. Her performance gained her a second Olivier Award nomination for Best Actress. That year, she also appeared in the Marvel One-Shot short film Agent Carter.

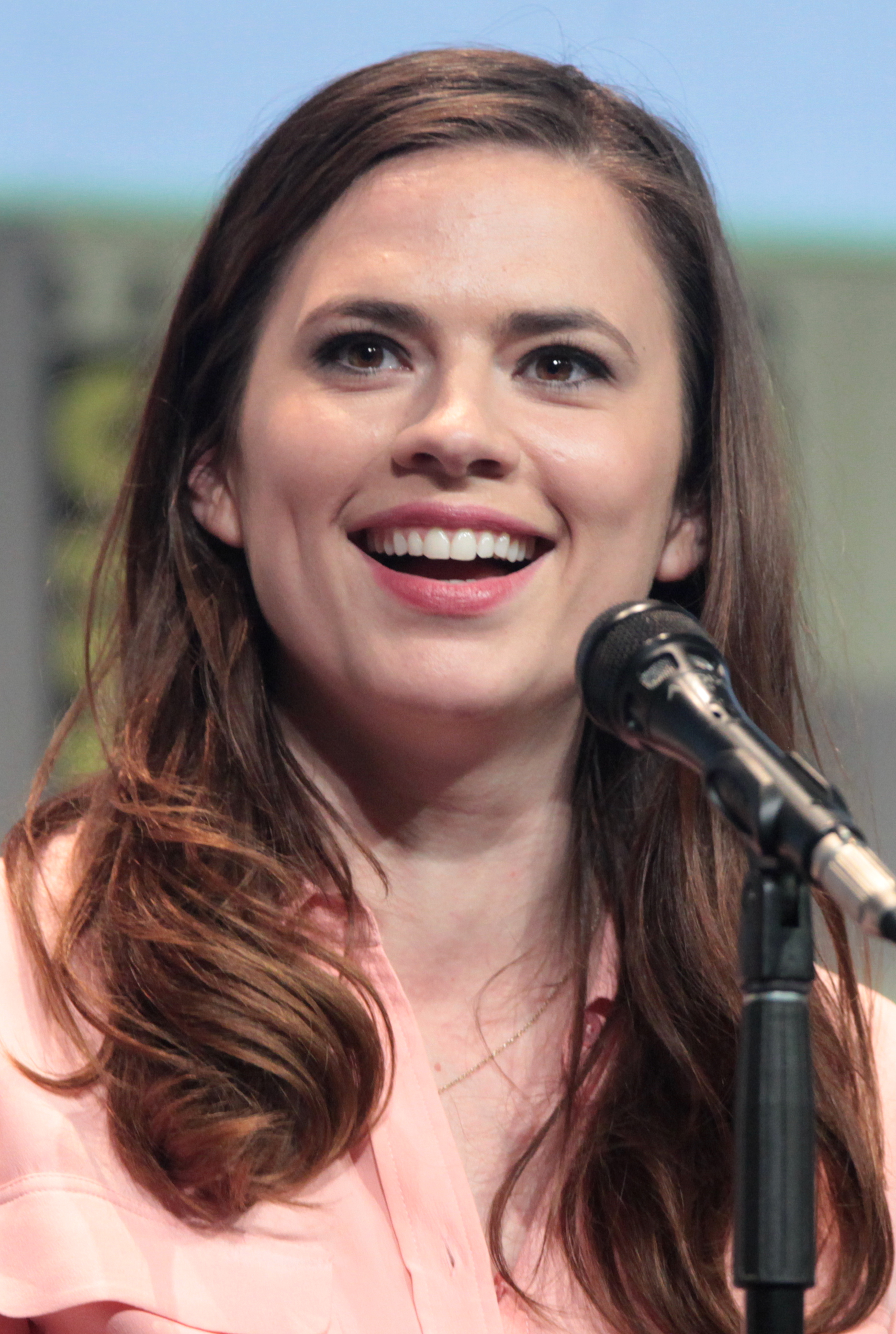
Atwell at the 2015 San Diego Comic-Con

Atwell returned to Marvel for the 2014 film Captain America: The Winter Soldier, and in the 2015 films Avengers: Age of Ultron and Ant-Man. As Carter, she appeared in two episodes of the ABC television show Agents of S.H.I.E.L.D., and as the lead role in Agent Carter, which aired from 2015 to 2016. Agent Carter was cancelled by ABC on 12 May 2016. She also provided Carter's voice in Lego Marvel's Avengers and Avengers: Secret Wars. In 2015, Atwell played Cinderella's mother in Disney's live action adaptation of Cinderella directed by Kenneth Branagh.

In February 2016, Atwell was cast in the ABC series Conviction. The series aired 13 episodes between October 2016 and January 2017; in May 2017, ABC announced it had been cancelled.

=== 2017–present: Return to theatre and Mission Impossible ===
Atwell starred as Margaret Schlegel in BBC One's 2017–2018 miniseries, Howards End, based on the classic E.M. Forster novel and adapted by playwright Kenneth Lonergan. In 2018, she played Evelyn Robin, the wife of the titular character in Disney's live action Winnie-the-Pooh film Christopher Robin directed by Marc Forster and co-starring with Ewan McGregor.

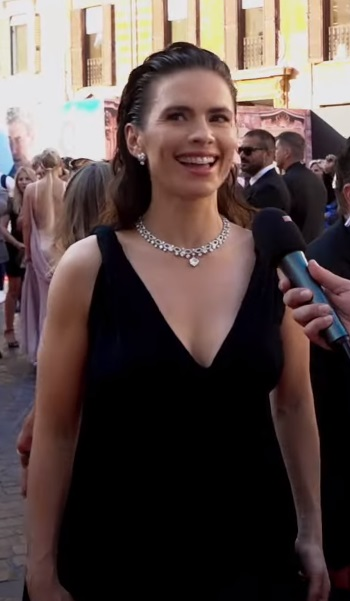
Atwell at the 2023 premiere of Mission: Impossible - Dead Reckoning Part One

Atwell returned to the stage in 2018 in Dry Powder at the Hampstead Theatre and later appeared in Josie Rourke's Measure for Measure at the Donmar Warehouse, opposite Jack Lowden. The production gained critical acclaim, with The Daily Telegraph adding that it was "beautifully staged and expertly performed". As a result of positive reception, the play's run was extended.

In 2019, Atwell starred opposite Tamara Lawrance in a three-part BBC adaptation of Andrea Levy's novel The Long Song, about a slave on a sugar plantation in 19th-century Jamaica. She also reprised the role of Peggy Carter in Avengers: Endgame. In September 2019, it was announced that Atwell would star in Mission: Impossible – Dead Reckoning Part One and Mission: Impossible – The Final Reckoning, both directed by Christopher McQuarrie and scheduled to be theatrically released in the United States in 2023 and 2025, respectively. In 2020, Atwell began hosting the podcast series True Spies. In 2021, early reviews for Peter Rabbit 2: The Runaway revealed Atwell as part of the film's voice cast as Mittens the cat. In 2022, Atwell would again reprise her role as Peggy Carter/Captain Carter in Doctor Strange and The Multiverse of Madness. That same year saw her partnered with The Picturehouse as part of the Picturehouse Ambassador Program as part of her own program Hayley Selects.

In December 2024, it was reported that Atwell would reprise her role of Peggy Carter in Avengers: Doomsday, scheduled to be released on 18 December 2026. During the Xbox Showcase in June 2026, Atwell was revealed to be portraying the villain Isabel in Fable, set to release on 23rd February 2027.

== Public image ==
Described as the "queen of period-drama" by Emine Saner, journalist writing for The Guardian, Atwell has been praised by directors for "the professional example she sets" and her work in period-drama films and television shows. Atwell received an Ian Charleson Commendation for her work in Major Barbara (2009), and has received three Laurence Olivier Award nominations, first for her work in A View from the Bridge (2009), then in 2011 for her work in the revival of The Pride, and again in 2020 for her performance as Rebecca West in Rosmersholm. Atwell was also nominated for a WhatsOnStage Award for her role in The Pride.

== Personal life ==
In 2010, Atwell lived in a flat in London. As of 2015, she had sporadic six-month stints in Los Angeles to be close to the production of Agent Carter, although she still retained her personal home in London. Atwell began a relationship with music producer Ned Wolfgang Kelly in 2022. In April 2023, they announced their engagement. The couple are married. Atwell gave birth to their child in 2024. As of 2025, the family live in south-west London.

During the filming of Captain America: The First Avenger in 2010, Atwell took a three-month course in art history and haiku at the Open University. Atwell is a video game enthusiast.

In October 2017, at the time of the accusations against Harvey Weinstein, a story emerged that, during filming of Brideshead Revisited in 2007, Weinstein had told Atwell she looked like a "fat pig" on screen and should eat less. Atwell later said that someone unconnected to Weinstein had suggested she lose weight to look more like a flapper. She also said that she did not believe that Weinstein was a sex addict, but a predator who should be punished for harassing women.

In a 2015 interview, Atwell discussed how her role as Peggy Carter influenced a then-recent tweet she made to her Twitter followers about having her image digitally altered on the cover of a German magazine. When one visitor to her page asked her, "Why are you so beautiful?", she retorted: "Why am I so photoshopped?" In the interview, Atwell stated: "It's important that young girls understand what photoshop is. I do feel a certain amount of responsibility now that I'm playing Peggy."

In 2025, Atwell said she was almost nine months pregnant while shooting one of the fight scenes in Mission: Impossible — The Final Reckoning. Atwell stated that she was offered to have a stunt double perform for her, but she replied: "No, I’ve worked too hard, let me do it!"

=== Political views and activism ===
In 2016, Atwell described feeling "very affected" by both Brexit and the election of Donald Trump, saying there was a "dark underbelly" of xenophobia and misogyny.

Alongside other British actors, Atwell joined a demonstration in London in support of the 2023 SAG-AFTRA strike in the U.S.

== Filmography ==
Key
†	Denotes films that have not yet been released

=== Film ===
Year	Title	Role	Notes	Ref.
2007	Cassandra's Dream	Angela Stark		
2007	How About You	Ellie Harris		
2008	Brideshead Revisited	Julia Flyte		
2008	The Duchess	Elizabeth "Bess" Foster		
2009	Love Hate	Hate	Short film	
2010	Tomato Soup	Movie Star	Short film	
2011	Captain America: The First Avenger	Peggy Carter / Agent Carter		
2012	I, Anna	Emmy		
2012	The Sweeney	DC Nancy Lewis		
2013	Jimi: All Is by My Side	Kathy Etchingham		
2013	Agent Carter	Peggy Carter	Short film	
2014	Captain America: The Winter Soldier	Peggy Carter		
2014	Testament of Youth	Hope Milroy		
2015	Cinderella	Cinderella's Mother		
2015	Avengers: Age of Ultron	Peggy Carter		
2015	Ant-Man	Peggy Carter	Cameo	
2016	The Complete Walk: Cymbeline	Imogen	Short film	
2018	Christopher Robin	Evelyn Robin		
2019	Blinded by the Light	Ms. Clay		
2019	Avengers: Endgame	Peggy Carter	Also in 2026 extended version	
2021	Peter Rabbit 2: The Runaway	Mittens	Voice	
2022	Independent Miss Craigie	Narrator	Documentary	
2022	Doctor Strange in the Multiverse of Madness	Peggy Carter / Captain Carter (Earth-838)		
2023	Mission: Impossible – Dead Reckoning Part One	Grace		
2024	The Imaginary	Lizzie	Voice; English dub	
2024	Paddington in Peru	Madison		
2025	Mission: Impossible – The Final Reckoning	Grace		
2025	Grand Prix of Europe	Cindy	Voice	
2026	Rogue Trooper	Venus Bluegenes		
2026	Avengers: Doomsday †	Peggy Carter	Post-production	
TBA	Empire City †	Dani	Post-production	

=== Television ===
Year	Title	Role	Notes	Ref.
2005	Whatever Love Means	Sabrina Guinness	Television film	
2006	Fear of Fanny	Jane	Television film	
2006	The Ruby in the Smoke	Rosa Garland	Television film	
2006	The Line of Beauty	Catherine "Cat" Fedden	3 episodes	
2007	Mansfield Park	Mary Crawford	Television film	
2007	The Shadow in the North	Rosa Garland	Television film	
2009	The Prisoner	Lucy / 4-15	5 episodes	
2010	The Pillars of the Earth	Aliena	8 episodes	
2010	Any Human Heart	Freya Deverell	4 episodes	
2012	Falcón	Consuelo Jiménez	4 episodes	
2012	Playhouse Presents	The Banker	Episode: "The Man"	
2012	Restless	Eva Delectorskaya	2 episodes	
2013	Black Mirror	Martha	Episode: "Be Right Back"	
2013	Life of Crime	Denise Woods	3 episodes	
2014	Agents of S.H.I.E.L.D.	Peggy Carter / Agent Carter	2 episodes	
2015–2016	Agent Carter	Peggy Carter / Agent Carter	Lead role; 18 episodes	
2016	Lip Sync Battle	Herself	Episode: "Clark Gregg vs. Hayley Atwell"	
2016	Return of the Spider Monkeys	Narrator	Documentary television film	
2016–2017	Conviction	Hayes Morrison	13 episodes	
2017–2019	Avengers Assemble	Peggy Carter	Voice; 2 episodes	
2017	Howards End	Margaret Schlegel	Miniseries	
2018	The Long Song	Caroline Mortimer	Miniseries	
2018–2019	3Below: Tales of Arcadia	Zadra	Voice; Main role; 17 episodes	
2019	Criminal: UK	Stacey Doyle	Episode: "Stacey"	
2021–2024	What If...?	Peggy Carter / Captain Carter	Voice; 8 episodes	
2024	Heartstopper	Aunt Diane	Season 3	
2024–2025	Tomb Raider: The Legend of Lara Croft	Lara Croft	Voice; Main role; 16 episodes	
2026–present	Rivals	Helen Gordon	Season 2	
2026	Treasure Island †	Bess Hawkins	Upcoming series	

=== Video games ===
Year	Title	Role	Notes	Ref.
2011	Captain America: Super Soldier	Peggy Carter	Voice role	
2016	Lego Marvel's Avengers	Peggy Carter	Voice role	
2027	Fable	Isabel	Voice and motion capture role	

=== Stage ===
Year	Title	Role	Venue	Ref.
2005	Prometheus Bound	Io / Force	Sound Theatre	
2006	Women Beware Women	Bianca	Royal Shakespeare Company	
2007	The Man of Mode	Belinda	Royal National Theatre	
2008	Major Barbara	Barbara Undershaft	Royal National Theatre	
2009	A View from the Bridge	Catherine	Duke of York's Theatre	
2011	The Faith Machine	Sophie	Royal Court Theatre	
2013	The Pride	Sylvia	Trafalgar Studios	
2018	Dry Powder	Jenny	Hampstead Theatre	
2018	Measure for Measure	Angelo / Isabella	Donmar Warehouse	
2019	Rosmersholm	Rebecca West	Duke of York's Theatre	
2025	Much Ado About Nothing	Beatrice	Theatre Royal Drury Lane	
2026-2027	Much Ado About Nothing	Beatrice	Winter Garden Theater, Broadway	

=== Radio ===
Year	Title	Role	Notes	Ref.
2006	Doctor Who: Blood of the Daleks	Asha Gryvern	BBC Radio 7	
2007	Felix Holt, the Radical	Esther Lyon	BBC Radio 4	
2008	The Leopard	Angelica	BBC Radio 3	
2008	Doctor Who: The Doomwood Curse	Eleanor	BBC Radio 7	
2010	Doctor Who: The Whispering Forest	Seksa	BBC Radio 7	
2013	Doctor Who: The Sands of Life	President Moorkurk		
2014	The Martian Chronicles	Spender	BBC Radio 4	
2016	The Magus	Lily	BBC Radio 4	
2017	Ecco	Jo Miles	BBC Radio 4	
2017	Cassandra at the Wedding	Cassandra Edwards	BBC Radio 4	
2017	Ode to Saint Cecilia	St. Cecilia	Augustine Institute Radio Theater	
2018	The Merchant of Venice	Portia	BBC Radio 3	

== Awards and nominations ==
Year	Award	Category	Nominee / Work	Result	Ref.
2007	Golden Nymph Awards	Best Performance by an Actress in a Television Film	Fear of Fanny	Nominated	
2008	British Independent Film Awards	Best Supporting Actress	The Duchess	Nominated	
2009	Empire Awards	Best Newcomer	Hayley Atwell	Nominated	
2009	London Critics Circle Film Awards	British Supporting Actress of the Year	The Duchess	Nominated	
2009	Ian Charleson Awards	Ian Charleson Commendation	Major Barbara	Won	
2010	Laurence Olivier Awards	Best Actress in a Supporting Role	A View from the Bridge	Nominated	
2011	Scream Awards	Breakthrough Performance – Female	Captain America: The; First Avenger	Nominated	
2011	Scream Awards	Best Science Fiction Actress	Captain America: The; First Avenger	Nominated	
2011	Golden Globe Awards	Best Actress – Miniseries or Television Film	The Pillars of the Earth	Nominated	
2011	Gemini Awards	Best Performance by an Actress in a Leading Role in a Dramatic Program or Mini-Series	The Pillars of the Earth	Nominated	
2011	Online Film & Television Association Awards	Best Actress in a Motion Picture or Miniseries	The Pillars of the Earth	Nominated	
2013	TV Choice Awards	Best Actress	Life of Crime	Nominated	
2014	Laurence Olivier Awards	Best Actress	The Pride	Nominated	
2014	WhatsOnStage Awards	Best Actress in a Play	The Pride	Nominated	
2014	Saturn Awards	Best Actress on Television	Agent Carter	Nominated	
2015	IGN Summer Movie Awards	Best TV Hero	Agent Carter	Nominated	
2018	Broadcasting Press Guild Awards	Best Actress	Howards End	Nominated	
2018	International Online Cinema Awards	Best Actress in a Limited Series or TV Movie	Howards End	Nominated	
2018	Golden Nymph Awards	Outstanding Actress in a Long Fiction Program	Howards End	Nominated	
2019	Standard Theatre Awards	Best Actress	Rosmersholm	Nominated	
2019	Women's Image Network Awards	Actress MFT Movie / Mini-Series	Howards End	Nominated	
2020	Laurence Olivier Awards	Best Actress	Rosmersholm	Nominated	
2026	Critics' Circle Theatre Awards	Best Shakespearean Performance	Much Ado About Nothing	Won	
2026	Standard Theatre Awards	Natasha Richardson Award for Best Actress	Much Ado About Nothing	Won	
