= Enron (play) =

2009 play based on the titular company's scandal

- Poster for the Broadway production
- Original language: English
- Written by: Lucy Prebble
- Characters: Claudia Roe; Kenneth Lay; Jeffrey Skilling; Andy Fastow
- Subject: The Enron scandal
- Setting: USA, 1992–2001

Premiere
- Date: 17 September 2009
- Place: Festival Theatre, Chichester, United Kingdom
- Official website

Enron (stylised as ENRON) is a 2009 play by the British playwright Lucy Prebble, based on the Enron scandal.

== Productions ==
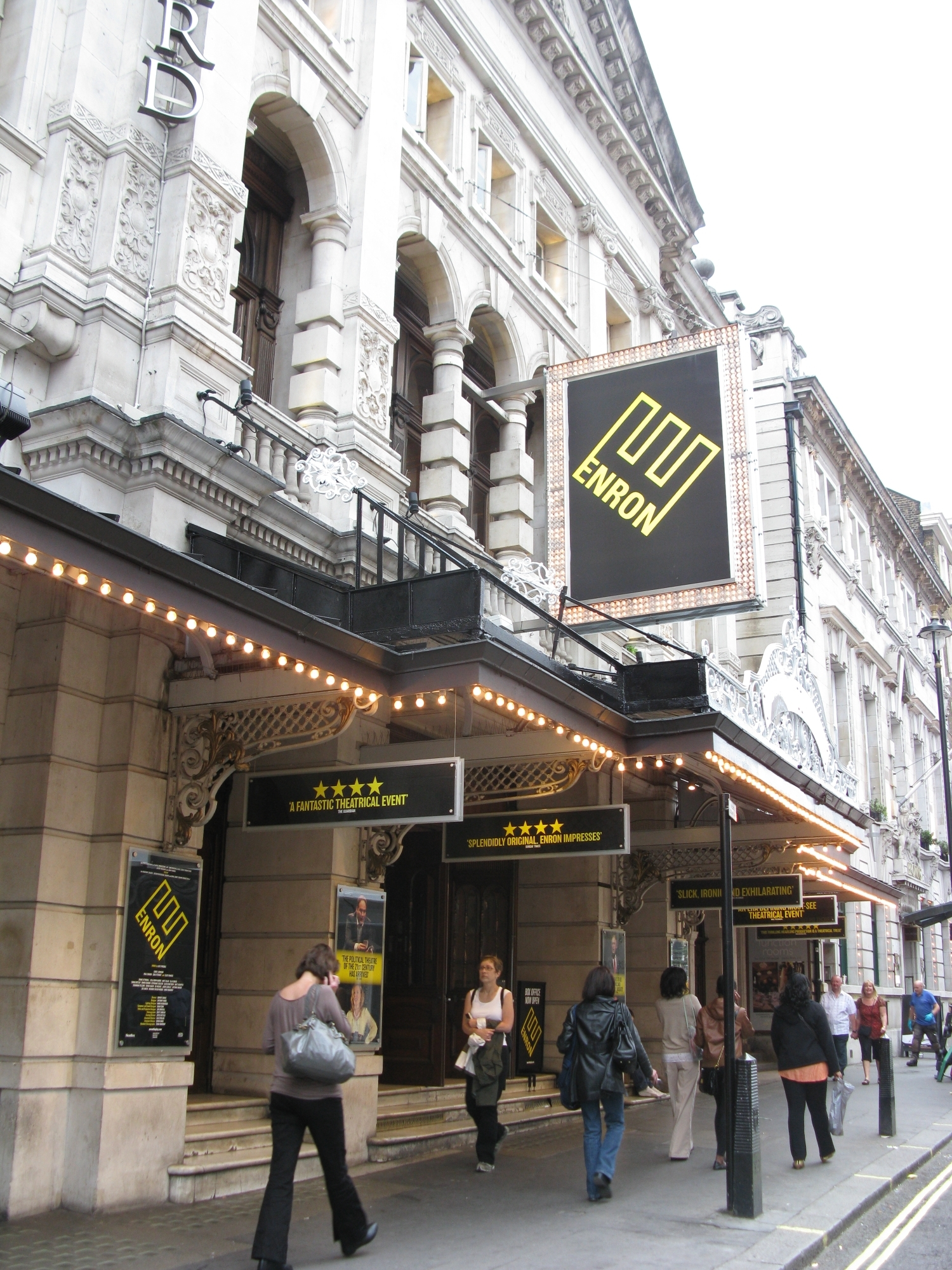
Enron at the Noël Coward Theatre in London's West End

Enron premiered at the Chichester Festival Theatre (11 July – 29 August 2009), before London transfers to the Jerwood Downstairs at the Royal Court Theatre from 17 September to 7 November 2009 and then the Noël Coward Theatre from 16 January to 14 August 2010 (after a cast change on 8 May). Directed by Rupert Goold with associate Sophie Hunter, the cast featured Samuel West as Jeffrey Skilling, Tom Goodman-Hill as Andrew Fastow, Amanda Drew as Claudia Roe, and Tim Pigott-Smith as Ken Lay.

Enron premiered on Broadway at the Broadhurst Theatre on 8 April 2010 in previews, with the official opening on 27 April. Directed by Rupert Goold with associate Sophie Hunter, the scenic and costume design was by Anthony Ward, lighting by Mark Henderson, music and sound by Adam Cork, video and projection by Jon Driscoll and movement by Scott Ambler. Gregory Itzin starred as Kenneth Lay with Norbert Leo Butz as Jeffrey Skilling, Marin Mazzie as Claudia Roe, and Stephen Kunken as Andrew Fastow. The Broadway production of Enron closed on 9 May 2010; it lasted just over a month. The Guardian's critic Michael Billington speculated that it was The New York Times' "hostile" review that contributed to its premature closure. He also stated its failure to earn nominations at the Tony Awards in major categories was its "kiss of death".

Enron was premiered in Reykjavík City Theatre in September 2010, in Dublin as part of the Dublin Theatre Festival in October 2010 and in Helsinki (Helsinki City Theatre) in November 2010.

== Plot ==
The play concerns the financial scandal and collapse of Enron, the American energy corporation, based in Texas. Enron executive Jeffrey Skilling and his boss Kenneth Lay are shown, as well as Skilling's protégé Andy Fastow, who rises to become the chief financial officer.

=== Act One ===
A lawyer tells the audience about world-changing. We then see a party to celebrate the introduction of mark-to-market accounting, where Andy Fastow is made fun of by other employees for wanting to go speak to Skilling, by whom he is promptly ignored. Claudia Roe (a fictional character) accompanies Ken Lay in his rounds of meeting employees. Skilling explains the new accounting system to the employees. Afterwards, Skilling and Roe have sex, before it is revealed Roe is slated to become the new president and Skilling is leaving his wife, for which Roe feels guilty. Their misuse of the company jet is also revealed. Skilling tells Roe about his ideas for the company. Skilling and Roe tell Lay about their plans for the company, before Lay selects Skilling to be the new president. Skilling envisages a modern company that deals only in numbers, while Roe wants to continue with Enron's current path. A trading floor is established, and the traders physically mock and berate Fastow when he tries to get some numbers from them, leading to Fastow messing up Skilling's Electricity plans. We also learn about Skilling congratulating a trader for losing multiple millions of dollars. In a split scene, Roe complains about Skilling's policy of cutting the bottom ten percent of workers, and convinces Lay to open a power plant in India. Meanwhile, Skilling uses a treadmill to punish Fastow, telling him about the Darwinian way he is running the company, before moving Fastow to finance. Analysts from major banks rate the stock to be a strong buy, and Skilling realises that he has complete control over the price. They hit a $50 stock price, before Lay talks about playing golf with the President, to try and get electricity deregulated, while also using the jet to visit family. Skilling talks to his daughter about counting, revealing a motif of counting money. Roe reveals her doubts about the stock price, while affirming her standing behind Skilling. She reveals a Harvard Business School professor wants to use Enron as a case study, and that her division is made fun of in Skilling's biker weekends. Skilling complains about Roe going over his head for the power plant, but then they see that Enron is rated at $60billion dollars. Andy Fastow names his baby after Skilling. Fastow explains hedging to the audience. He then shows Skilling his "Raptors" – financial models that act as hedges without actual hedges. Skilling explains that while Enron is declaring profits, no actual profits are actually coming through, meaning there is a deficit of money. Fastow suggests he becomes CFO. He shows Skilling a series of shell companies that Enron can offload bad assets into, made up of 97% Enron stock, but still qualify as independent. This would also keep the stock price up, with the heart of the companies being made up of just a few million. Skilling makes Fastow CFO, and suggests they use Wall Street money to fund the heart of the business, named LJM after Fastow's family. The accountants and lawyers argue over its legality, but eventually sign off on the idea. Skilling reveals Video on Demand (with Blockbuster) and bandwidth trading at a New Year's Eve party at the turn of the millennium, while Roe fights to remain relevant. The raptors take physical shape in Fastow's office, resembling those from Jurassic Park.

== Premiere casts ==
| Character | West End | Broadway |
|---|---|---|
| Claudia Roe | Amanda Drew | Marin Mazzie |
| Kenneth Lay | Tim Pigott-Smith | Gregory Itzin |
| Jeffrey Skilling | Samuel West | Norbert Leo Butz |
| Andy Fastow | Tom Goodman-Hill | Stephen Kunken |
| Gayle Davenport | Gillian Budd | Jordan Ballard |
| Lehman Brothers | Peter Caulfield / Tom Godwin | Rightor Doyle/ Anthony Holds |
| Security Officer | Howard Charles | Brandon Dirden |
| Irene Gant | Susannah Fellows | Lusia Strus |
| Arthur Andersen | Stephen Fewell | Anthony Holds |
| Senator | Orion Lee | Tom Nelis |
| Elise Da Luca | Eleanor Matsuura | January LaVoy |
| Trader | Ashley Rolfe | Brandon Dirden; Rightor Doyle; Anthony Holds; Ty Jones; Ian Kahn; Tom Nelis; Jeff Skowron; Noah Weisberg |
| Lawyer | Trevor White | Ian Kahn; Ty Jones; Donald Ferguson |
| Daughter | | Mary Stewart Sullivan Madisyn Shipman |

== Response ==
Tim Walker, the Sunday Telegraph critic, gave it five stars, drawing parallels with the plot to that of King Lear. "While it isn't done any more to say this in the financial pages, I say it here with conviction: Enron is a strong buy," he wrote.

In The New York Times review of the Broadway production, Ben Brantley wrote, contrary to some other critics, "even with a well-drilled cast that includes bright Broadway headliners like Norbert Leo Butz and Marin Mazzie, the realization sets in early that this British-born exploration of smoke-and-mirror financial practices isn’t much more than smoke and mirrors itself. Enron is fast-paced, flamboyant and, despite the head-clogging intricacy of its business mathematics, lucid to the point of simple-mindedness. But as was true of the company of this play's title, the energy generated here often feels factitious, all show (or show and tell) and little substance."

Michael Billington, critic for The Guardian, dubbed Brantley's comments an "obtuse and hostile review", stating that "Enron's fate was sealed the moment Brantley's review appeared [...] As a fellow critic, I respect Brantley's right to his opinion; what is dismaying is his failure to see what Prebble and Goold were up to [...] But no serious play on Broadway can survive a withering attack from The New York Times, which carries the force of a papal indictment".

== Awards and nominations ==
Enron won the 2009 Theatrical Management Association award for Best New Play and was also nominated for Best Performance in a Play (Samuel West). In the 2009 Evening Standard Theatre Awards, it won Best Director and was nominated for Best Actor (for West) and Best Play (for Prebble).

The play received Tony Award nominations for the 2010 Best Original Score (Music and/or Lyrics) Written for the Theatre, 2010 Best Featured Actor in a Play (Kunken), 2010 Best Lighting Design of a Play (Mark Henderson), and 2010 Best Sound Design of a Play (Adam Cork).
