= Jamie Lloyd (director) =

British theatre director (born 1980)

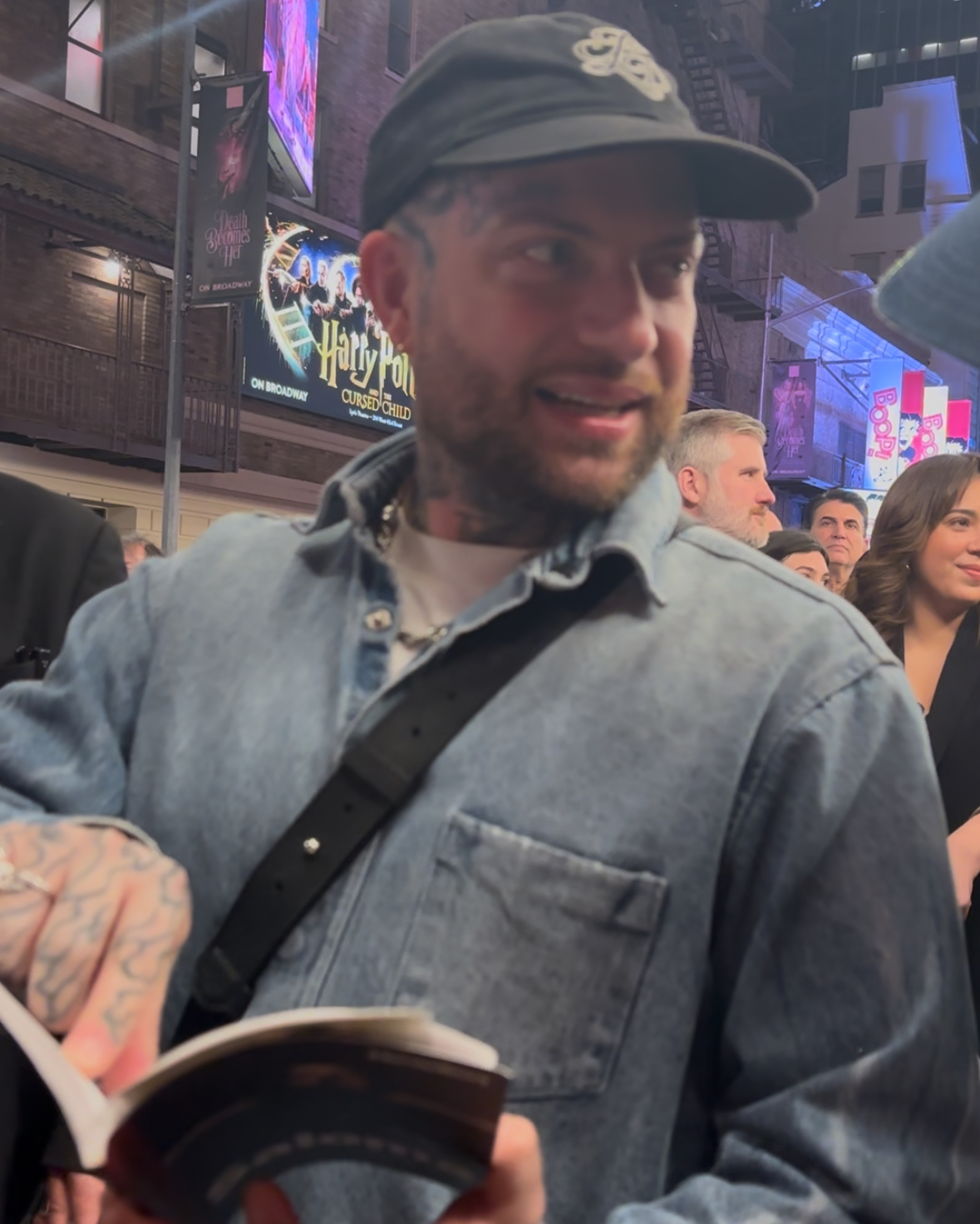
- Lloyd outside of the St. James Theatre in April 2025
- Born: Jamie Lloyd; November 12, 1980 (age 46); Poole, Dorset
- Occupation: Theatre director
- Years active: 1985–present

Jamie Lloyd (born 1980, Poole, Dorset), is a British theatre director and producer. A prominent figure of the contemporary British theatre, he is best known for his work with his eponymous theatre company, The Jamie Lloyd Company.

The company creates adventurous productions, including radical reappraisals of Waiting for Godot (Broadway, 2025), Evita (West End, 2025), Much Ado About Nothing (West End, 2025), Sunset Boulevard (West End, 2023 / Broadway, 2025 – winner of seven Olivier Awards and three Tony Awards), Romeo and Juliet (West End, 2024), A Doll's House (Broadway, 2023), Cyrano de Bergerac (West End, 2019 & 2022 / BAM, New York, 2022 – winner of Olivier Award for Best Revival), The Seagull (West End, 2022) and Betrayal (West End / Broadway, 2019).

The Jamie Lloyd Company's productions of Much Ado About Nothing and Evita transfer to Broadway in Fall 2026 and Spring 2027, respectively.

== Early life and education ==
Jamie Lloyd was born in Poole, Dorset, in 1980. Lloyd studied at the Liverpool Institute for Performing Arts.

== Career ==
=== 2006–2012 ===
Lloyd's first main house production was Harold Pinter's The Caretaker at the Sheffield Theatres, which started a rich relationship with the playwright, with Lloyd heralded as a major Pinter interpreter. He directed a Pinter double-bill in the West End - The Lover and The Collection - in 2008, before he was appointed as an Associate Director of the Donmar Warehouse by Michael Grandage.

Lloyd was the Associate Director of the Donmar Warehouse from 2008 to 2011, where his productions included Piaf (2008), which transferred to the West End and Buenos Aires, and Passion (2010) which won the Standard Theatre Award for Best Musical.

He was also an Associate Artist at theatre company Headlong, where he directed an anarchic production of Oscar Wilde's Salome. In 2008 he directed The Pride at the Royal Court, which won the Olivier Award for Outstanding Achievement in an Affiliate Theatre.

During this period Lloyd was labelled a 'wunderkind of London theatre', and named a Rising Star by the Daily Telegraph in 2009.

=== 2013–2023 ===
In 2013, The Jamie Lloyd Company, initially a partnership between Jamie Lloyd and the Ambassador Theatre Group, was launched. Under the new company, and as Artistic Director of Trafalgar Studios, Lloyd presented a new season of work, 'Trafalgar Transformed'. The first season featured three productions: a revival of The Pride, The Hothouse starring Simon Russell Beale and John Simm, and Macbeth, starring James McAvoy and Claire Foy, which received an Olivier nomination for Best Revival. The second ‘Trafalgar Transformed’ season opened in July 2014 with Richard III starring Martin Freeman, East is East (directed by Sam Yates), and The Ruling Class, again starring James McAvoy.

In 2015, Lloyd directed Harold Pinter's The Homecoming starring Gemma Chan and John Simm. The following year he directed a new adaptation of The Maids by Jean Genet, starring Uzo Aduba, Zawe Ashton, and Laura Carmichael, both at Trafalgar Studios. This was followed by Doctor Faustus at the Duke of York's Theatre starring Kit Harington.

In 2018, Lloyd announced 'Pinter at the Pinter' a revolutionary sixth month long season of Harold Pinter's one act and short plays staged on the tenth anniversary of his death at The Harold Pinter Theatre. The season starred Simon Russell Beale, Gemma Chan, Danny Dyer, Paapa Essiedu, Martin Freeman, Tamsin Greig, David Suchet, Hayley Squires, Russell Tovey among many others, in works including One for the Road; A New World Order; Mountain Language; The Lover; The Collection; Landscape; A Kind of Alaska; Monologue; Party Time; Celebration; The Dumb Waiter; A Slight Ache, and many of Pinter's poems, speeches and sketches, including the newly discovered The Pres and an Officer.

The Pinter at the Pinter season culminated with a revival of Betrayal starring Tom Hiddleston, Zawe Ashton and Charlie Cox, which received critical acclaim, with the critic Matt Wolf remarking that the production "represents a benchmark achievement for everyone involved, and shows Pinter’s 1978 play in a revealing, even radical, new light." The production transferred to the Bernard B. Jacobs Theatre on Broadway, receiving four Tony Award nomination including Best Revival of a Play and Best Direction of a Play, as well as nominations in the Outer Critics’ Circle Awards for Outstanding Director of a Play, and Outstanding Revival of a Play, and Outstanding Revival of a Play from the Drama League Awards. Ben Brantley in The New York Times called it "one of those rare shows I seem destined to think about forever."

In 2019, The Jamie Lloyd Company announced a season of three plays at the Playhouse Theatre, directed by Lloyd. The season consisted of Cyrano de Bergerac with James McAvoy in a new version by Martin Crimp, The Seagull starring Emilia Clarke in a version by Anya Reiss, and A Doll's House starring Jessica Chastain. His production of Cyrano de Bergerac earned five Olivier Award nominations, including Best Director, and Best Revival, which it won. Lloyd also won the Critics’ Circle Theatre Award jointly for his 2019 productions, Betrayal, Evita and Cyrano de Bergerac, and was nominated for a South Bank Sky Arts Award for Cyrano de Bergerac.

In 2023, Lloyd directed Henrik Ibsen's A Doll's House starring Jessica Chastain and Arian Moayed at the Hudson Theatre, Broadway, receiving six Tony Award nominations, including Best Revival of a Play and Best Direction of a Play. That same year, he directed a revival of the musical Sunset Blvd. starring Nicole Scherzinger as Norma Desmond, at the Savoy Theatre in the West End, winning seven Olivier Awards including Best Musical Revival and Best Director. Produced in association with The Jamie Lloyd Company, Lloyd also directed the Lucy Prebble play The Effect at the National Theatre starring Paapa Essiedu and Taylor Russell.

In addition to his work under The Jamie Lloyd Company, Lloyd also continued directing independently including a production of Richard Greenberg's Three Days of Rain at the Apollo Theatre, starring regular collaborator, James McAvoy, which was nominated for Best Revival at the Olivier Awards; Assassins at the Menier Chocolate Factory in 2014, for which he was nominated for the Standard Theatre Award for Best Director; and Evita at Regent's Park Open Air Theatre in 2019, which received two Olivier Award nominations, including Best Musical Revival, and won Lloyd the WhatsOnStage Award for Best Director.

=== 2024–present ===
In January 2024, Lloyd announced that The Jamie Lloyd Company had become a fully independent production company, following his successful 10-year partnership with Ambassador Theatre Group.

In 2024, Lloyd's critically acclaimed production of The Effect transferred to The Shed in New York. His next production for the West End was Romeo and Juliet, starring Tom Holland and Francesaca Amewudah-Rivers. In September that year, Sunset Blvd. transferred to the St. James Theatre on Broadway with Scherzinger reprising her role; the production was nominated for seven Tony Awards, winning three including Best Revival of a Musical.

Later that year, Lloyd opened a Shakespeare season at the Theatre Royal Drury Lane, with The Tempest, starring Sigourney Weaver as Prospero, marking the return of Shakespeare's work to the venue for the first time since 1957. This was followed in February 2025 by Much Ado About Nothing, starring Tom Hiddleston as Benedick and Hayley Atwell as Beatrice. The production transferred with Hiddleston and Atwell to Broadway in Fall 2026 at the Winter Garden Theatre.

In Summer 2025, Lloyd's production of Tim Rice and Andrew Lloyd Webber's Evita opened to critical acclaim at the London Palladium, with Rachel Zegler's performance of "Don't Cry for Me Argentina" from the balcony outside the venue at each performance attracting over 100,000 fans on the street over the course of the run. The production was nominated for five Laurence Olivier Awards including Best Musical Revival. Evita is scheduled to transfer to Broadway's Winter Garden Theatre in Spring 2027, following Lloyd's Much Ado About Nothing.

In September 2025, Lloyd returned to Broadway, directing Samuel Beckett’s Waiting for Godot, which opened at the Hudson Theatre starring Keanu Reeves and Alex Winter.

== Style and reputation ==
Lloyd is a proponent of affordable theatre for young and diverse audiences, and has been praised as "redefining West End theatre". The Daily Telegraph critic Dominic Cavendish wrote of Lloyd, "Few directors have Lloyd’s ability to transport us to the upper echelons of theatrical pleasure."

In 2025, British Vogue labelled him as “one of the most celebrated theatre directors in the world” and Time Out described him as “the biggest director in the world.” He was also recognised as a GQ Man of the Year and included in the Out100, as well as being awarded Great Creative Briton at the Walpole British Luxury Awards.

In 2014, Lloyd entered The Stage's annual Stage 100, a list of the most influential people in British Theatre, at number 20—the youngest director to break into the list since Sam Mendes. Lloyd has since been regularly included, featuring at number 6 in 2026, the highest placed director on the list.

== Personal life ==
Lloyd’s partner is Broadway performer Brandon LaVar Whitmore.

== Works ==
=== The Jamie Lloyd Company Productions ===
- 2027: Evita (Winter Garden Theatre)
- 2026: Much Ado About Nothing (Winter Garden Theatre)
- 2025: Waiting for Godot (Hudson Theatre)
- 2025: Evita (London Palladium)
- 2025: Much Ado About Nothing (Theatre Royal Drury Lane)
- 2024: The Tempest (Theatre Royal Drury Lane)
- 2024: Sunset Boulevard (St. James Theatre)
- 2024: Romeo and Juliet (Duke of York's Theatre)
- 2024: The Effect (The Shed)
- 2023: Sunset Boulevard (Savoy Theatre)
- 2023: The Effect (National Theatre)
- 2023: A Doll's House (Hudson Theatre)
- 2022: Cyrano de Bergerac (Harold Pinter Theatre, Theatre Royal, Glasgow and BAM)
- 2022: The Seagull (Harold Pinter Theatre)
- 2019: Cyrano de Bergerac (Playhouse Theatre)
- 2019: Betrayal (Harold Pinter Theatre/Bernard B. Jacobs Theatre)
- 2019: A Slight Ache and The Dumb Waiter (Harold Pinter Theatre)
- 2018/2019: Party Time and Celebration (Harold Pinter Theatre)
- 2018: Landscape and A Kind of Alaska and Monologue (Harold Pinter Theatre)
- 2018: Moonlight and Night School (Harold Pinter Theatre)
- 2018: The Room and Victoria Station and Family Voices (Harold Pinter Theatre)
- 2018: The Lover and The Collection (Harold Pinter Theatre)
- 2018: One for the Road and The New World Order and Mountain Language and Ashes to Ashes (Harold Pinter Theatre)
- 2016: Doctor Faustus (Duke of York's Theatre)
- 2016: The Maids (Trafalgar Studios)
- 2016: The Homecoming (Trafalgar Studios)
- 2015: The Ruling Class (Trafalgar Studios)
- 2014: East is East (Trafalgar Studios/UK Tour - directed by Sam Yates)
- 2014: Richard III (Trafalgar Studios)
- 2013: The Pride (Trafalgar Studios/UK Tour)
- 2013: The Hothouse (Trafalgar Studios)
- 2013: Macbeth (Trafalgar Studios)

=== Other Directing credits ===
- 2019: Evita (Regent's Park Open Air Theatre)
- 2017: Apologia (Trafalgar Studios)
- 2017: Guards at the Taj (Bush Theatre)
- 2017: Killer (Shoreditch Town Hall)
- 2017: The Pitchfork Disney (Shoreditch Town Hall)
- 2014: Assassins (Menier Chocolate Factory)
- 2014: Urinetown (St. James Theatre/Apollo Theatre)
- 2013: The Commitments (Palace Theatre)
- 2012: Cyrano de Bergerac (Roundabout, Broadway)
- 2012: The School for Scandal (Theatre Royal, Bath)
- 2012: The Duchess of Malfi (The Old Vic)
- 2012: She Stoops To Conquer (National Theatre, Olivier)
- 2011: Inadmissible Evidence (Donmar Warehouse)
- 2011: The 25th Annual Putnam County Spelling Bee (Donmar Warehouse)
- 2011: The Faith Machine (Royal Court)
- 2010: Polar Bears (Donmar Warehouse)
- 2010: Passion (Donmar Warehouse)
- 2010: Company (concert version)
- 2010: Salome (Hampstead Theatre, for Headlong)
- 2010: The Little Dog Laughed (Garrick)
- 2009: Three Days of Rain (Apollo Theatre)
- 2009: A House Not Meant to Stand and The Cocktail Party (stage readings)
- 2008: The Pride (Royal Court)
- 2008: Piaf (Vaudeville/Teatro Liceo, Buenos Aires/Nuevo Teatro Alcala, Madrid)
- 2008: Eric's (Liverpool Everyman)
- 2008: The Lover and The Collection (Comedy Theatre)
- 2007: The Caretaker (Sheffield Crucible and Tricycle)
- 2004: Elegies: a Song Cycle (Arts Theatre)
- 2001: Falsettoland (Edinburgh)

== Awards and nominations ==
Year	Award	Category	Nominee	Result	Ref.
2020	Tony Awards	Best Revival of a Play	Betrayal	Nominated	
2020	Tony Awards	Best Direction of a Play	Betrayal	Nominated	
2023	Tony Awards	Best Revival of a Play	A Doll's House	Nominated	
2023	Tony Awards	Best Direction of a Play	A Doll's House	Nominated	
2025	Tony Awards	Best Direction of a Musical	Sunset Boulevard	Nominated	
2025	Tony Awards	Best Revival of a Musical	Sunset Boulevard	Won	
2008	Laurence Olivier Awards	Best Musical Revival	Piaf	Nominated	
2008	Laurence Olivier Awards	Outstanding Achievement in Affiliate Theatre	The Pride	Won	
2009	Laurence Olivier Awards	Best Revival	Three Days of Rain	Nominated	
2010	Laurence Olivier Awards	Best Musical Revival	Passion	Nominated	
2013	Laurence Olivier Awards	Best Revival	Macbeth	Nominated	
2020	Laurence Olivier Awards	Best Revival	Cyrano de Bergerac	Won	
2020	Laurence Olivier Awards	Best Director	Cyrano de Bergerac	Nominated	
2020	Laurence Olivier Awards	Best Musical Revival	Evita (Regent's Park Open Air Theatre)	Nominated	
2024	Laurence Olivier Awards	Best Director	Sunset Boulevard	Won	
2024	Laurence Olivier Awards	Best Musical Revival	Sunset Boulevard	Won	
2024	Laurence Olivier Awards	Best Revival	The Effect	Nominated	
2026	Laurence Olivier Awards	Best Musical Revival	Evita	Nominated	
2026		Best Revival	Much Ado About Nothing	Nominated	
2010	Standard Theatre Awards	Best Musical Revival	Passion	Won	
2019	Standard Theatre Awards	Best Musical Revival	Evita (Regent's Park Open Air Theatre)	Won	
2019	Standard Theatre Awards	Best Director	Betrayal	Nominated	
2023	Standard Theatre Awards	Best Director	Sunset Boulevard	Won	
2026	Standard Theatre Awards	Best Musical	Evita	Won	
2026	Standard Theatre Awards	Best Director	Much Ado About Nothing	Nominated	
2020	Critics' Circle Theatre Awards	Best Director	Betrayal, Evita, Cyrano de Bergerac	Won	
2026	Critics' Circle Theatre Awards	Best Revival of a Play or Musical	Evita	Nominated	
2026	Critics' Circle Theatre Awards	Best Director	Evita and Much Ado About Nothing	Nominated	
2014	WhatsOnStage Awards	Best Play Revival	The Pride	Nominated	
2014	WhatsOnStage Awards	Best Direction	Macbeth, The Hothouse and The Pride	Nominated	
2014	WhatsOnStage Awards	Best Shakespearean Production	Macbeth	Nominated	
2020	WhatsOnStage Awards	Best Play Revival	Betrayal	Won	
2020	WhatsOnStage Awards	Best Direction	Evita (Regent's Park Open Air Theatre)	Won	
2022	WhatsOnStage Awards	Best Play Revival	Cyrano de Bergerac	Won	
2024	WhatsOnStage Awards	Best Musical Revival	Sunset Boulevard	Nominated	
2024	WhatsOnStage Awards	Best Direction	Sunset Boulevard	Won	
2024	WhatsOnStage Awards	Best Play Revival	The Effect	Nominated	
2025	WhatsOnStage Awards	Best Play Revival	Romeo & Juliet	Nominated	
2026	WhatsOnStage Awards	Best Musical Revival	Evita	Won	
2026	WhatsOnStage Awards	Best Play Revival Award	Much Ado About Nothing	Nominated	
2026	WhatsOnStage Awards	Best Direction	Much Ado About Nothing	Nominated	
2020	Drama League Award	Outstanding Revival of a Play	Betrayal	Nominated	
2022	Drama League Award	Outstanding Direction of a Play	Cyrano de Bergerac	Nominated	
2022	Drama League Award	Outstanding Revival of a Play	Cyrano de Bergerac	Nominated	
2024	Drama League Award	Outstanding Revival of a Play	A Doll's House	Won	
2024	Drama League Award	Outstanding Direction of a Play	A Doll's House	Nominated	
2025	Drama League Award	Outstanding Revival of a Musical	Sunset Boulevard	Won	
2025	Drama League Award	Outstanding Revival of a Play	The Effect	Nominated	
2025	Drama League Award	Outstanding Direction of a Play	The Effect	Nominated	
2024	Drama Desk Awards	Outstanding Revival of a Musical	Sunset Boulevard	Nominated	
2024	Drama Desk Awards	Outstanding Direction of a Musical	Sunset Boulevard	Nominated	
2020	Outer Critics Circle Award	Outstanding Revival of a Play	Betrayal	Nominated	
2020	Outer Critics Circle Award	Outstanding Director of a Play	Betrayal	Nominated	
2024	Outer Critics Circle Award	Outstanding Revival of a Musical	Sunset Boulevard	Nominated	
2020	South Bank Sky Arts Award		Cyrano de Bergerac	Nominated	

== See also ==
- List of English speaking theatre directors in the 20th and 21st centuries
