= Being Human (British TV series) series 1 =

First series of 2009 British supernatural drama programme

Being Human
- Series 1
- Starring: Lenora Crichlow; Russell Tovey; Aidan Turner
- No. of episodes: 6

Release
- Original network: BBC Three
- Original release: 25 January – 1 March 2009

Series chronology
- Next → Series 2

Being Human is a British supernatural drama programme created and written by Toby Whithouse for BBC Three. The first series began airing on 25 January 2009 and concluded on 1 March 2009. It follows the lives of a vampire, a werewolf and a ghost who live together and try to integrate themselves into society. It stars Lenora Crichlow as Annie Sawyer, a ghost, Russell Tovey as George Sands, a werewolf, and Aidan Turner as John Mitchell, a vampire.

== Background ==
=== Relationship with Pilot Episode ===
A pilot episode, later informally titled “The Monsters Within”, was released on 18 February 2008, starring Andrea Riseborough as Annie, Russell Tovey as George and Guy Flanagan as Mitchell. The pilot episode was not widely reviewed, and some reviews were not positive. A review in The Daily Telegraph called the pilot one of BBC Three's "wildly uneven" new shows. Brian McIver, writing for the Daily Record felt the show lacked sex appeal and that the plot was boring, concluding: "so what?" But, by late January 2009, the Daily Record reported that most of the reviews of the pilot had raved about the new show. Viewership for the pilot was very high, and a massive online petition drive helped turn the pilot into a series. However, two of the three main roles were recast. This was partially due to the longer-than-usual waiting period between the pilot episode and the official series. This resulted in some of the actors being unavailable for returning to the show. And also partially due to a shift in tone for the show, for which other actors were more suited. The only actors to reprise their roles were Russell Tovey (George Sands) and Dylan Brown (Seth). Annie and Mitchell were both recast with Lenora Crichlow and Aidan Turner filling in the roles. Creator Toby Whithouse considers the pilot to be canonical.

=== Production ===
Interior shots of Annie's house, the hospital and the funeral parlour were filmed on sound stages with exterior scenes filmed on location in Bristol.

=== Promotion ===
To promote the show, the BBC launched a blog and on 22 December 2008, three 5-minute prequels were released concerning the three main characters. Mitchell's is set in the 1960s and details his moments with his latest prey. George's is a vlog filmed by an American tourist and shows George's infection by a werewolf. Annie's shows her haunting a couple that have just moved into her former house and eventually drives them out. The series premiered on BBC America in the US on 25 July 2009 and 4 August on Fox in Portugal.

Originally, every episode in the first series was unnamed, along with the second series also. However, Toby Whithouse conducted a public poll on his blog to informally name all the episodes in the first and second series’.

== Cast ==
=== Main Cast ===
- Lenora Crichlow as Annie Sawyer
- Russell Tovey as George Sands
- Aidan Turner as John Mitchell

=== Supporting Cast ===
- Gregg Chillin as Owen Narayan
- Annabel Scholey as Lauren Drake
- Sinéad Keenan as Nina Pickering
- Jason Watkins as William Herrick
- Dylan Brown as Seth
- Clare Higgins as Josie Hunter
- Sama Goldie as Janey Harris
- Dean Lennox Kelly as Tully
- Alex Price as Gilbert
- Julia Ford as Fleur

== Episodes ==
No. overall	Episode	Directed by	Written by	Original release date	UK viewers (millions)
1	Episode 1	Toby Haynes	Toby Whithouse	25 January 2009	1,092,000
We are introduced to our main characters. Mitchell is shown having sex with Lauren, then killing and infecting her. George is shown being scratched by a werewolf. Annie is shown dead on the floor and becomes a ghost, therefore becoming invisible to humans. However, when Mitchell and George move in, they can see her due to their supernatural nature. When Mitchell is working at the hospital, he sees Seth about to infect one of the patients. He intervenes Seth and stops him. George and Mitchell meet a new nurse called Becca, who is a replacement for Lauren. George is then faced with a dilemma. As the usual place where he transforms on a full moon is undergoing renovation. Mitchell and George quickly drive out to the woods where George tries to transform but is constantly surrounded by people. They quickly drive back to the house where he transforms, wrecking the place in the process. Annie's ex-fiance and landlord of the house, Owen, comes round to visit. Annie wants the guys to ask Owen about his life, much to their reluctance. Mitchell and Owen then go on to talk about Annie and their relationship. Herrick meets Mitchell at the hospital, telling him that everything is about to change, suggesting he's planning a global vampire invasion. Meanwhile, George is confronted by newly-infected vampire Lauren. Now knowing Mitchell killed her, he confronts him, disapproving strongly. Becca then asks Mitchell out for a drink, which he accepts. George discovers Mitchell's on a date with Becca. He rushes off to make sure that Mitchell doesn't kill her. On the date, Lauren comes in and tries to disrupt the date. Mitchell pulls her outside and tells her that he can save her and that they can run away together. Lauren doesn't want to be saved. George finds Lauren in the alleyway and she pushes him against the wall, suffocating him before throwing him to the ground. There he sees Becca, her throat has been slit and she is bleeding out onto the ground. Mitchell comes out and finds them like this. Lauren demands that he save her by turning her and George begs him to save her but Mitchell won't. George goes to the sink to clean his bloodied shirt. A man is standing outside, watching him.
2	Episode 2	Toby Haynes	Toby Whithouse	1 February 2009	974,000
George meets a homeless werewolf, Tully, a rogue who offers George advice on dating women and teaches George how to deal with his transformations. After Tully tries to sexually assault Annie, Mitchell wants him thrown out of the house, but George defies him and backs Tully, until Tully goes too far with Nina…
3	Episode 3	Alex Pillai	Rachel Anthony	8 February 2009	815,000
Annie meets Gilbert, a ghost from the 1980s, who shows her her own headstone. Her subsequent exploration of why she has remained on Earth after her death results in her discovering that she was actually murdered by Owen, throwing her emotions into conflict. After Lauren sends Mitchell a DVD of her murdering a man, Mitchell tries to help Lauren give up killing and bring her back to the person she was. George struggles to build a relationship with Nina, unsure of how much he should tell her. Gilbert expresses his love for Annie, and is then permitted to "cross over" to Death through a supernatural doorway. From this, Annie learns that until she fulfills the one thing keeping her Earth-bound, she will never be permitted to cross over.
4	Episode 4	Alex Pillai	Brian Dooley	15 February 2009	815,000
Mitchell befriends a twelve-year-old boy named Bernie and his divorced mum, Fleur, an innocent relationship that helps the vampire to stay on the wagon. But when a DVD depicting vampire sex accidentally falls into Bernie's hands, his mother immediately jumps to the wrong conclusion – and it isn't long before the entire neighbourhood has branded Mitchell as a paedophile. As the housemates’ lives descend into chaos, George decides to tell Nina the truth about his lycanthropy; unfortunately his muddled efforts to explain himself only confuse Nina more, especially when she hears the rumours about Mitchell. Meanwhile, Annie has become traumatized by the revelation of her death at Owen's hands– and when her ex-fiance pays a visit to the house to sort out the problems reported by the neighbours, Annie flies into a rage and exacts her revenge...
5	Episode 5	Colin Teague	Toby Whithouse	22 February 2009	797,000
Haunted by the way his friendship with Bernie ended, Mitchell finds himself drawn back into the world of vampirism; he falls off the wagon and begins feeding off the terminally ill that come to the hospital where he works. Nina becomes even more suspicious of George's erratic behaviour. Returning to the lair of his fellow vampires, Mitchell receives a warm welcome from Herrick; however, he soon learns that the vampire leader has a terrifying plan to ensure their race's survival: by converting all of humanity into vampires. Back at the house, Annie finally confronts Owen about her death – but his reaction is not what she expected…
6	Episode 6	Colin Teague	Toby Whithouse	1 March 2009	1,086,000
After recovering in hospital from Herrick's near-fatal attack, Mitchell vows to deal with the vampire leader and his followers once and for all. Annie's decision to stay with her friends and reject the Door to the Afterlife appears to have given her new powers, and she decides to use it to help Mitchell in his confrontation with the vampires. Meanwhile, George finds himself facing a terrible dilemma: should he join his friends in their forthcoming battle, or flee to safety to start a new life with Nina? Realising that his friends are counting on him, George decides to help Mitchell and Annie – but in the final showdown with Herrick and the vampires, not everyone is destined to survive…

== Reception ==
The first series of Being Human received largely positive reviews. On review aggregator Rotten Tomatoes, the first series has an approval rating of 100% based on 14 reviews, with an average rating of 8.2 out of 10. The site's critics consensus reads: “Being Human is a genre gem that turns horror tropes inside out, utilising it’s monster mash of a cast to thoughtfully examine existential quandaries”. The first series of Being Human also received positive reviews on Metacritic, scoring 79 out of 100, indicating “generally favourable reviews”.

The first series of the show became one of the most popular shows on BBC iPlayer.

Mark Oakley of Den of Geek called it “a generally excellent series”. He called the confrontation between Herrick and George “a truly fantastic scene”. He also gave praise to Tovey and Watkins saying he “came into his own in the series finale” and “provided most of the series’ acting plaudits”, respectively. Whilst also praising Turner as “demonstrating a powerful screen presence”.

Noel Murray of the A.V. Club called it “one of the most genuinely horrific horror shows ever made, with a good mix of creepy effects and subtle suggestiveness”.

Mary McNamara of the Los Angeles Times says “Being Human manages to avoid both the slipperiness of a soap opera and the overwrought self-importance of goth, finding instead a happy normalcy that makes its supernatural elements both more believable and more shocking”.
