= Episode 1 (Being Human series 1) =

- Being Human episode
- Episode no.: Season 1 Episode 1
- Directed by: Toby Haynes
- Written by: Toby Whithouse
- Original air date: 25 January 2009

Guest appearances
- Annabel Scholey as Lauren; Jason Watkins as Herrick; Gregg Chillin as Owen; Dylan Brown as Seth; Jessica Harris as Becca; Sama Goldie as Janey; Howard Coggins as Maintenance Man; Rebecca Cooper as Canteen Girl; Sarah Counsell as HCA Nurse; Paul Kasey as Werewolf; George Oliver as Pizza Delivery Boy; Dean Lennox Kelly as Tully

Episode chronology
← Previous "Pilot"	Next → "Episode 2"

The first episode of the first series of the BBC fantasy television show Being Human was broadcast on 25 January 2009.

As with the pilot episode and all episodes of the first and second series of Being Human, this episode was not provided with a name when originally broadcast. It is informally known as Flotsam and Jetsam, a name provided by a poll run via Toby Whithouse's blog.

This was the first episode to introduce the series' finalised cast: Lenora Crichlow, Russell Tovey and Aidan Turner with Jason Watkins and Annabel Scholey in the main supporting roles.

== Synopsis ==
=== Cold open ===
Annie: (voiceover) "Everyone dies. Actually, can I start that again? Everyone deserves a death."

Bristol, England, present day: Annie muses on her current situation. She's a young woman who also happens to be a ghost, killed after a fall in her home. As her family, friends and fiancé move on without her, she haunts her former house. Unable to either communicate or even effectively make herself known to the succession of tenants who rent it, she is close to succumbing to "the worst thing about being a ghost... It's lonely. You'll give anything for that crumb of comfort. That feel of skin against skin that says, 'It's okay. I'm here.' It's a hunger. The most basic instinct." Her voiceover plays over scenes of her loneliness.

However, Annie is not alone in her terrible separation from humanity. Two young men each have a similar, related problem. Mitchell, a former young soldier, is now a vampire for whom "death isn't the end, but the beginning" and who harbours terrible guilt over his victims. George is a reluctant werewolf, whom Annie describes as being among "the ones that should have died. But shattered and bloody, they walk away from the train wreck. But what's the cost? They're scarred. Transformed. They're monsters now too. Aberrations. The stuff of nightmares. The big bad wolf." (In parallel intercuts, the viewer is shown Mitchell's recruitment and awakening as a vampire, and George's survival of a werewolf attack followed by a scene of his transformation from man to wolf: also shown is Mitchell's killing of a young woman, Lauren, by draining her blood.)

Annie continues her monologue: "So here we are. Overlooked and forgotten. Unnatural and... supernatural. Watching the dance from the sidelines... What have we got left to look forward to? Us refugees? The flotsam and jetsam of death. Maybe, if we still deserve such a thing as mercy, we find each other." The final scenes are of Mitchell and George, already friends, preparing to move into Annie's house. From inside, Annie watches them through the window. She smiles her first genuine, hopeful smile.

=== Main episode ===
Mitchell has trouble restraining his blood lust in the present and has to deal with its consequences in the past. Herrick, the local vampire king, is trying to cajole him back into the vampire fold, reasoning that Mitchell's legendary reputation will inspire other vampires. Herrick has also recruited the most recent victim of Mitchell's intermittent blood lust, Lauren, as a vampire; and she comes to see Mitchell with vengeance on her mind.

Annie must deal with her past: most specifically, the fact that her former fiancé Owen (also the owner of the house where she, Mitchell and George live) is now engaged to her former rival Janie Harris. When Owen comes to visit his tenants at the house, Annie must deal with the fact that he cannot see her - and with her own feelings.

George finds that he no longer has a safe place to transform when the hospital renovates the basement storage room he has been using up until now. With Mitchell's help, he tries to use the woods but finds them full of people: the only safe place to transform is at home, although he smashes the furniture and upsets his housemates.

A mysterious figure (revealed in the following episode to be Tully) is watching the house.

== Cast ==
=== Main cast ===
Actor	Role
Lenora Crichlow	Annie Sawyer
Russell Tovey	George Sands
Aidan Turner	John Mitchell

=== Recurring cast ===
Actor	Role
Jason Watkins	Herrick
Annabel Scholey	Lauren Drake
Gregg Chillin	Owen Norayan
Dylan Brown	Seth
Sama Goldie	Janey Harris
Rebecca Cooper	Cara (Canteen Girl)
Paul Kasey	Werewolf
Dean Lennox Kelly	Lee Tully

=== Guest cast ===
Actor	Role
Jessica Harris	Becca
Howard Coggins	Maintenance Man
Sarah Counsell	HCA Nurse
George Oliver	Pizza Delivery Boy

== Reception ==
IGN gave the first episode an 8.6 rating out of 10, saying that "[the makers of the show are] definitely off to a great start and have already presented us with a very intriguing universe".

== Recasting and change in tone ==
Russell Tovey (George) and Dylan Brown (Seth) were the only cast members from the pilot episode to renew their roles for Series 1. The roles of Mitchell, Annie, Herrick and Lauren were all recast. This was partially due to the longer-than-usual waiting period between pilot episode and formally committed series (resulting in some of the original actors becoming unavailable) and partially due to a shift in tone for which other actors were better suited. Compared to the pilot, producer Matthew Bouch described the series as "less gothic and slightly more rooted" as well as "a bit funnier"; he also described the series as "kind of a reboot" of the pilot.

These factors resulted in a distinct change in tone from the pilot episode. Annie (now played by Lenora Crichlow) was an ostensibly sunnier and more scatterbrained character than had been suggested by the more awkward, dour characterisation from Andrea Riseborough in the pilot; while Aidan Turner's take on Mitchell was more relaxed and smooth in presentation. Most notably, the recast Herrick (originally played by Adrian Lester) was altered in multiple respects including speech style, race and general demeanour. Originally an elegant, reserved and stylish vampire monarch, the new portrayal by Jason Watkins reinvented Herrick as a pudgy, avuncular middle-aged vampire working as a police sergeant, with a friendly manner masking a vicious streak.

== Relationship with pilot episode ==
Although Flotsam and Jetsam is the first episode of Being Human (and for most long-term viewers, the set-up episode to the show) it was preceded one year previously by a pilot episode, later titled The Monsters Within. Series creator Toby Whithouse has stated that he considers the story and events in The Monsters Within to be canonical, even though the production style and casting were noticeably different. The events of The Monsters Within precede those of Flotsam and Jetsam by an unspecified period, but probably no more than days or weeks as Mitchell's killing of Lauren and its immediate aftermath is still relatively recent.

The cold open of Flotsam and Jetsam restated, in a highly compressed form, several events and plot elements either shown or referred to The Monsters Within. These included the attack which infected George with the werewolf condition (and his subsequent transformation) and Mitchell's attack on Lauren. It also introduced elements not covered in The Monsters Within, including Mitchell's own recruitment into the vampire world by Herrick and greater illustration (via montage) of Annie's experiences of loneliness, resentment and disaffection following her own death.

Several scenes from The Monsters Within were recreated or adapted for the main body of the episode. These included the scene in which Mitchell warns off Seth from entering the hospital (which was mostly unaltered) and the scene in which Herrick notifies Mitchell of the coming vampire takeover and the need for Mitchell to pick a side (which was scripted, staged and played with an entirely different tone and no longer involved Lauren).

Some of the other events and scenes which took place in The Monsters Within were neither recreated nor referred to in Flotsam and Jetsam. Notably, there was no attempt to restage the initial meeting of Mitchell, George and Annie (the main episode began with all three relatively comfortably established as housemates), George and Mitchell's original application for jobs at the Bristol hospital, or Herrick's sumptuously staged address to the vampires in the Bristol basement. Some of the content of the latter (which was now too grandiose for the new conception of the character) was reworked into dialogue within "walk-and-talk" scenes between Herrick and Mitchell in and around the hospital grounds.

The subplot of George's abandonment of his former girlfriend Julie and her attempts to confront him over it (which had been central to The Monsters Within) was jettisoned. It was not denied or explicitly contradicted over the course of the subsequent series, but nor was it ever referred to again, and Julie would not return to the series. George would refer only in the most general sense to those he'd had to leave behind, and viewers would not encounter anyone from George's previous life until Daddy Ghoul (the sixth episode of Series 3, which focussed specifically on George's parents). The abandonment of this subplot also meant the loss of a significant scene in which George confronted Julie's abusive new boyfriend Peter and succeeded in intimidating him while also holding off his own werewolf urge to kill and eat.

Abandoning the Julie story also meant not recreating the climactic sequence in The Monsters Within (during which Julie confronts George in his safe room just as he is due to transform, unaware that she is risking her life, and in which Annie has to intervene to save Julie). This sequence had established Annie's conquering of her own ghost-fear (presented as being similar to agoraphobia) of leaving her own place of death. Annie's development of greater confidence and abilities, including the ability to leave her home and travel further afield, was developed at a slower pace over the course of Series 1.
