= List of Being Human (British TV series) episodes =

This is a complete list of episodes for the BBC Three supernatural drama-comedy television series Being Human. The original premise of the series was that a ghost, a vampire, and a werewolf became friends and began living together in a house in Bristol. All three characters appear to be in their 20s. The programme's original cast included Lenora Crichlow as Annie the ghost, Russell Tovey as George the werewolf, and Aidan Turner as Mitchell the vampire.

For series 3, Sinead Keenan was promoted from a supporting to a main character as George's werewolf girlfriend, Nina, and the characters and the show's location moved to Barry, Vale of Glamorgan. Turner left the show at the end of series 3, and his character was killed off. On 11 November 2011, Russell Tovey announced that he was leaving Being Human during series 4 to work full-time on his other show, Him & Her, and he appeared in the first episode only. Keenan also did not return to the series. Damien Molony was introduced as vampire Hal, with Michael Socha's previously recurring role as werewolf Tom promoted to the main cast. Series 4 also introduced Kate Bracken as Alex, who soon becomes a ghost and takes Annie's place in the household at the conclusion of the series when the latter passes over into the afterlife.

Originally, the pilot episode and all episodes of Series 1 and 2 were untitled. Semi-official names have since been provided via a competition run by series creator Toby Whithouse via his blog.

== Summary ==
Series	Episodes	Originally released	
Series	Episodes	First released	Last released
Pilot		18 February 2008	
1	6	25 January 2009	1 March 2009
Special		28 March 2009	
2	8	10 January 2010	28 February 2010
3	8	23 January 2011	13 March 2011
4	8	5 February 2012	25 March 2012
5	6	3 February 2013	10 March 2013

== Episodes ==
=== Pilot (2008) ===
No. overall	No. in season	Title	Directed by	Written by	Original release date	UK viewers (millions)
1	1	"Pilot"	Declan O'Dwyer	Toby Whithouse	18 February 2008	430,000
Two Bristol-based young men, George (a werewolf) and Mitchell (a vampire), have formed a friendship and desire to live in as normal and human a way as possible. They move into a houseshare together only to discover that their new home is haunted by Annie, the ghost of a previous occupant. As the three endeavour to deal with each other and develop their friendships, George must deal with the unexpected return of the girlfriend whom he abandoned once he became a werewolf (and who does not know the truth of his condition), while Mitchell must deal with the imperial ambitions of the Bristol vampire clan and his recent creation of a new vampire, Lauren.

=== Series 1 (2009) ===
The series deals with a supernatural threat, Herrick, a Vampire Leader. The cast and tone of Being Human changed between the pilot and the series. Compared to the pilot, producer Matthew Bouch described the series as "less gothic and slightly more rooted" as well as "a bit funnier"; he also described the series as "kind of a reboot" of the pilot. Writer Toby Whithouse, however, said that he does consider the pilot to be canonical.

Interior shots of Mitchell, Annie, and George's home, the hospital, and the vampires' funeral home headquarters were filmed on sound stages with exterior shots filmed on location. The funeral parlour's exterior and reception room were filmed in an old car showroom in Bristol, while the back rooms were filmed in a television studio.

To promote the show, the BBC launched a blog, and on 22 December 2008, the BBC Being Human web page aired three prequel videos to introduce the three main characters: Mitchell's is set in the 1960s, George's is a video diary of his visit of Scotland, and Annie's shows her as a ghost terrorizing a couple who had moved into the house. Series one of Being Human premiered in the US on 25 July 2009 on BBC America and on 4 August on Fox in Portugal.

Metacritic assigned a rating of 79 out of 100 based on 8 critical reviews, with reviews averaging 7.8 out of 10.

No. overall	No. in season	Title	Directed by	Written by	Original release date	UK viewers (millions)
2	1	"Episode 1"	Toby Haynes	Toby Whithouse	25 January 2009	1,092,000
Mitchell struggles with his growing lust for blood when he's asked out on a date. Annie has a hard time dealing with her emotions when she comes face to face with someone from her past. George has nowhere to transform.
3	2	"Episode 2"	Toby Haynes	Toby Whithouse	1 February 2009	974,000
George is approached by another werewolf (Tully) who offers to teach him how to deal with his rare affliction, but soon begins to outstay his welcome. Tully is at first warm and friendly with Annie, then when he tries to forcibly kiss her she resists him. Confused and scared, Annie vanishes and runs to the hospital looking for Mitchell and George. She doesn't find them, so she hides near the house where Mitchell finds her and learns the truth. When George returns home, Mitchell tells him what happened and demands that Tully leave, but George refuses to believe them and lets Tully stay. Though George learns some helpful things about managing his condition, he begins to see Tully for what he really is, and realising that Mitchell and Annie were right, he abandons Tully and returns home to his friends.
4	3	"Episode 3"	Alex Pillai	Rachel Anthony	8 February 2009	815,000
When Annie gets depressed at what should have been her wedding anniversary to Owen, the boys take her to a club where she meets Gilbert, a ghost who died in 1985 and loves the music and culture of that decade, who tells Annie she is in a ghostly state because she has unresolved business in her life. Sweet on Annie, Gilbert moves into the house. George is overjoyed to find that, despite being a werewolf, he can still function sexually. Mitchell is stalked by Lauren. Gilbert eventually passes over, having learned that his purpose was to fall in love (with Annie). Annie Does not pass on, even after the horrifying realisation that she did not die in an accident, but was murdered by her boyfriend Owen. She has a flashback where she sees herself in an argument with Owen who is physically and verbally abusive towards her. During the argument he pushes her over the stairs leading to her death.
5	4	"Episode 4"	Alex Pillai	Brian Dooley	15 February 2009	815,000
Mitchell makes friends with a boy on the street called Bernie, but after a terrible misunderstanding things turn very nasty and before long there is a full-blown witch-hunt in the neighbourhood.
6	5	"Episode 5"	Colin Teague	Toby Whithouse	22 February 2009	797,000
Disillusioned by his efforts to be human, Mitchell returns to the company of his fellow undead to help recruit new vampires. George lures Owen to the house where Annie tries to haunt him, but despite being shocked at her unexpected appearance, Owen recovers and refuses to be scared by her. He taunts her feeble attempts at trying to scare him and mocks her, leaving her helpless and distraught. Annie decides to visit Janie to warn her. She's terrified, but refuses to heed the warnings that Owen could kill her next. Janie shares a moment of doubt with Annie where she tells her that Owen is sometimes weird, but they are interrupted by Owen's arrival. When Janie runs to him, he sees Annie but refuses to acknowledge her presence, instead calming down Janie by telling her that it was only the guilt of their affairs during his time with Annie that is causing her mental stress. Repulsed by his sheer evil and heartbroken at her inability to do anything, Annie returns home devastated. Meanwhile, Mitchell meets up with Josie, an ex-girlfriend who now has incurable cancer. He offers her immortality only to discover that several of the 'recruits' are unwilling victims. The three house-mates invade the vampires' lair, then back at the house Annie finally has her revenge on Owen, only to meet another obstacle to her passing over.
7	6	"Episode 6"	Colin Teague	Toby Whithouse	1 March 2009	1,086,000
Mitchell must confront Herrick once and for all.

=== Series 2 (2010) ===
Series two began filming in August 2009, and began airing in the UK on 10 January 2010. It was expanded to eight episodes, with series creator Toby Whithouse writing the first two and last two episodes. The cold open sequences followed a new pattern: from episode two onwards each one depicts something from the history of either the main cast or other characters. A prequel posted on the BBC website introduced two new vampire characters: Ivan and Daisy. BBC America began transmitting Series 2 on 24 July 2010.

This series was concerned with a human threat, CenSAA.

No. overall	No. in season	Title	Directed by	Written by	Original release date	UK viewers (millions)
8	1	"Episode 1"	Colin Teague	Toby Whithouse	10 January 2010	1,613,000
9	2	"Episode 2"	Colin Teague	Toby Whithouse	17 January 2010	1,279,000
10	3	"Episode 3"	Colin Teague	Lucy Catherine	24 January 2010	1,207,000
11	4	"Episode 4"	Kenny Glenaan	Jamie Mathieson	31 January 2010	1,105,000
12	5	"Episode 5"	Kenny Glenaan	Tony Basgallop	7 February 2010	1,230,000
13	6	"Episode 6"	Charles Martin	Lisa McGee	14 February 2010	902,000
14	7	"Episode 7"	Charles Martin	Toby Whithouse	21 February 2010	1,087,000
15	8	"Episode 8"	Charles Martin	Toby Whithouse	28 February 2010	1,231,000

=== Series 3 (2011) ===
Series 3 premiered in the United Kingdom on 23 January 2011, and contained eight episodes. The show was now set in Barry, Wales, with the characters having moved from Bristol following the "Box Tunnel" murders (committed by main character John Mitchell). Lacey Turner played the recurring character Lia, a ghost encountered by Mitchell when he travelled to "the other side" in an attempt to rescue Annie from purgatory.

Robson Green and Michael Socha play father and son recurring werewolf characters MacNair (given name Anthony not used until his final episode) and Thomas MacNair. Both he and his teenage son are vampire killers. The series also reveals that zombies also exist in the Being Human universe and one appears in the third episode. BBC America began transmitting Series 3 on 18 February 2011.

Series 3 story arcs included a prophecy that Mitchell would die from a "wolf-shaped bullet" (killed by a werewolf), Nina's pregnancy, and the resurrection of the cruel, manipulative vampire, Herrick.

No. overall	No. in season	Title	Directed by	Written by	Original release date	UK viewers (millions)
16	1	"Lia"	Colin Teague	Toby Whithouse	23 January 2011	1,569,000
17	2	"Adam's Family"	Colin Teague	Brian Dooley	30 January 2011	1,378,000
18	3	"Type 4"	Philip John	Jamie Mathieson	6 February 2011	1,296,000
19	4	"The Pack"	Colin Teague	John Jackson	13 February 2011	1,253,000
20	5	"The Longest Day"	Philip John	Sarah Phelps	20 February 2011	1,258,000
21	6	"Daddy Ghoul"	Philip John	Lisa McGee	27 February 2011	985,000
22	7	"Though the Heavens Fall"	Daniel O'Hara	Toby Whithouse	6 March 2011	1,049,000
23	8	"The Wolf-Shaped Bullet"	Daniel O'Hara	Toby Whithouse	13 March 2011	1,100,000

=== Series 4 (2012) ===
On 13 March 2011, Whithouse and BBC Three announced that Being Human would return for a fourth series. Eight 60-minute episodes were commissioned.

The producer also said some old characters would return, and he intended to introduce new ones. Radio Times reported that the fourth series is likely to air in early 2012, and that the characters will continue to live on Barry Island. On 19 April 2011, BBC America announced it would co-produce the fourth series with BBC Three.

On 30 April 2011, actor Michael Socha, who plays the innocent young werewolf Tom, told the Derby Telegraph that he'd been asked by Toby Whithouse to appear in Series Four. On 26 May, actor Craig Roberts told British magazine SFX that his character will return to the show. Roberts, who plays the eternally teenaged vampire Adam, said, "I believe I am going back for an episode. They've not mentioned too much about Becoming Human. If that does get mentioned again I'm all for doing it because I thought it was a great thing. I'm really happy to do Being Human again because it's a fantastic show, and if Becoming Human wants to go again, I'm game." On 22 July, the Warrington Guardian reported that 22-year-old Andrew Gower had been cast as Cutler, a vampire who will become one of the main characters on the show. South Wales actor Darren Evans appeared on the show as a vampire, reprising his role later on in series five.

On 16 October 2011, SFX magazine revealed that Irish actor and 2011 Spotlight Prize nominee Damien Molony (a recent graduate of the Drama Centre London) had been cast as the new vampire Hal. Molony told the magazine in an interview that Hal is an upper-class, very English, well-dressed vampire for which the writers have laid out an extensive back-story. Molony also revealed that his character will fall in love. Series creator Toby Whithouse told the online version of magazine Digital Spy that the series would "have to re-establish...relatively soon in series four" the main concept of a vampire, werewolf, and ghost living in a home together, but declined to comment further on what the details of this might be. In an interview with the Web site CultBox, series star Russell Tovey said that Hal would be "the new head vampire."

Series star Russell Tovey denied rumors that his werewolf character George Sands might not appear in the entire series. In his CultBox interview, Tovey said that the plot lines were "very spread out", that "a lot more happens", and that a number of new main and recurring characters had been added to Series Four. "[T]he storyline is going completely crazy,..." he said. Dave Golder, writing for SFX magazine, concluded that Tovey's comments meant fans would see less of George and more of the new characters, and that Whithouse would be likely to reinvent the show with all these changes.

The filmmakers returned to Barry Island to film season four in late July 2011, where they continued to use local man Gary Rowe's house as the group's bed-and-breakfast base of operations. Students from the drama and theatre programme at Coleg Gwent were used as extras and in minor roles on the show. Cast member Damien Molony said in mid-October 2011 that several scenes for the series' final episodes had already been filmed.

On 11 November 2011, Russell Tovey announced he was leaving the show after Series 4.

The March 2012 issue of SFX magazine revealed the episode titles for series four as part of a preview feature.

No. overall	No. in season	Title	Directed by	Written by	Original release date	UK viewers (millions)
24	1	"Eve of the War"	Philip John	Toby Whithouse	5 February 2012	1,227,000
25	2	"Being Human 1955"	Philip John	Lisa McGee	12 February 2012	926,000
26	3	"The Graveyard Shift"	Philip John	Jamie Mathieson	19 February 2012	780,000
27	4	"A Spectre Calls"	Daniel O'Hara	Tom Grieves	26 February 2012	862,000
28	5	"Hold the Front Page"	Philip John	Tom Grieves	4 March 2012	940,000
29	6	"Puppy Love"	Daniel O'Hara	John Jackson	11 March 2012	867,000
30	7	"Making History"	Daniel O'Hara	Toby Whithouse	18 March 2012	918,000
31	8	"The War Child"	Philip John	Toby Whithouse	25 March 2012	911,000

=== Series 5 (2013) ===
Following the broadcast of the series four finale the BBC confirmed that a fifth series had been commissioned. Michael Socha and Damien Molony reprised their roles as Tom and Hal, and Kate Bracken joined the main cast as Alex. The series started 3 February 2013 with "The Trinity".

No. overall	No. in season	Title	Directed by	Written by	Original release date	UK viewers (millions)
32	1	"The Trinity"	Philip John	Toby Whithouse	3 February 2013	731,000
33	2	"Sticks and Ropes"	Philip John	Daragh Carville	10 February 2013	1,032,000
34	3	"Pie and Prejudice"	Philip John	Jamie Mathieson	17 February 2013	979,000
35	4	"The Greater Good"	Daniel O'Hara	John Jackson	24 February 2013	988,000
36	5	"No Care, All Responsibility"	Daniel O'Hara	Sarah Dollard	3 March 2013	1,075,000
37	6	"The Last Broadcast"	Daniel O'Hara	Toby Whithouse	10 March 2013	1,086,000

=== Making-of special (2009) ===
The Making-of is called Being Human Unearthed. It was broadcast on 28 March 2009 on BBC Three In the United States it was shown at 26 July 2009 on BBC America. The Being Human fans in Australia could see Being Human Unearthed at 11 June 2010 on ABC 2.

Title	Directed by	Original release date
"Being Human Unearthed"	Colin Teague	28 March 2009
In Being Human Unearthed it is shown how the series is made. The actors Aidan Turner, Russell Tovey, Lenora Crichlow, Sinead Keenan, Annabel Scholey and Jason Watkins talk about their characters. The writer Toby Whithouse gives a lot of background information. Alex Price is the narrator of the special.
