= Pilot (Being Human) =

- Being Human episode
- Episode no.: Series 1 Episode 1
- Directed by: Declan O'Dwyer
- Written by: Toby Whithouse
- Original air date: 18 February 2008

Guest appearances
- Adrian Lester as Herrick; Claire Foy as Julia; Dominique McElligott as Lauren; Dylan Brown as Seth; Saikat Ahamed as Mortuary Attendant; Zara Ramm as Cathy; Huw Davies as Rory; Will Irvine as Peter; Nathalie Armin as Eleanor; Alan Bond-Ballard as Wake Guest (uncredited); Chris Wilson as Hospital Doctor (uncredited)

Episode chronology
← Previous —	Next → "Flotsam and Jetsam"

The pilot episode of the BBC fantasy television show Being Human aired on BBC Three on 18 February 2008.

As with all episodes of the first and second series of Being Human, this episode was not provided with a name when broadcast.

== Synopsis ==
=== Cold open ===
Night scenes of a young man (Mitchell) alone with a young woman (Lauren) are intercut with parallel night scenes of a different, haunted-looking young man (George) walking alone through the woods. Mitchell and Lauren's date has ended up in her flat, but despite the seductive atmosphere Mitchell seems more interested in talking to an uncomprehending Lauren about George's situation. In subsequent intercuts, George is seen finding a suitable place in the centre of the woods, stripping naked, and then slowly and painfully transforming into a werewolf, screaming throughout the process. Mitchell reaches the end of his musing — his eyes turn jet black, his fangs lengthen and he attacks Lauren, drinking her blood. He is a vampire.

=== Main episode ===
Two Bristol-based young men, George and Mitchell, have formed a friendship and desire to live in as normal and human a way as possible. As George is a werewolf and Mitchell a vampire, this is more of a challenge than usual. They move into a house together only to discover that their new home is haunted by Annie, the ghost of a previous occupant.

As the three endeavour to deal with each other and develop their friendships, all three face further challenges. George must deal with the unexpected return of the girlfriend whom he abandoned once he became a werewolf (and who does not know the truth of his condition). Annie must reaccustom herself to the bravery needed to sustain new loyalties. Mitchell must deal with the imperial ambitions of the Bristol vampire clan and his recent creation of a new vampire — Lauren.

== Cast ==
=== Main cast ===
Actor	Role
Andrea Riseborough	Annie Sawyer
Russell Tovey	George Sands
Guy Flanagan	John Mitchell

=== Guest cast ===
Actor	Role
Adrian Lester	Herrick
Claire Foy	Julia Beckett
Dominique McElligott	Lauren Drake
Dylan Brown	Seth
Saikat Ahamed	Mortuary Attendant
Zara Ramm	Cathy
Huw Davies	Rory
Will Irvine	Peter
Nathalie Armin	Eleanor
Charmane Hibberd	Neeru

== Story arc and plot developments ==
The pilot set up the initial premise for Being Human - a vampire, a werewolf, and a ghost living together and supporting each other while each struggles to deal with the world of humanity and their own (perhaps impossible) desire to return to it. Several character traits were set up which would carry over into future episodes including George's stern discipline and denial regarding his werewolf condition (as well as his own vulnerability to its broader effects) and Mitchell's balancing act between a vampiric sense of superiority, his self-disgust at his own murderous past and his tendencies toward temptation.

Some differences and possible discrepancies existed between the pilot episode and the subsequent series:

- The characterisation of Annie (as performed by Andrea Riseborough) and Herrick (as performed by Adrian Lester) is markedly different from the portrayals by Leonora Critchlow and Jason Watkins in the recast commissioned series broadcast the following year.
- The nature of the coming vampire takeover plot is more traditional and vague than is the subtler and more structured plan of infiltration which emerges in the commissioned series.

== Conception and production background ==
Series creator Toby Whithouse was already an established TV writer, having already created the series No Angels and written for various other series including the revived Doctor Who. He originally conceived Being Human as a non-fantasy drama about three flatmates struggling to cope with various inconvenient conditions (addiction, long-term illness and psychological problems) before realising that it would be more entertaining if adapted to a fantasy setting.

Having written the Doctor Who episode School Reunion for the programme's second series (broadcast in 2006 but filmed the previous year) Whithouse was contacted by the BBC and invited to submit a pilot script for a TV show, as part of a set of pilot episodes to be made and broadcast on BBC3 with the option of possible future commissioning. Though not a fan of the television pilot process, Whithouse took a chance on submitting his concept for Being Human, reasoning that it might be the only chance of getting the show noticed and made. In 2007, Danny Cohen, the controller of BBC Three, formally commissioned the pilot of Being Human, West 10 LDN, Mrs In-Betweeny, and Phoo Action pilots as part of the rebranding of BBC Three. Even before the pilots were broadcast, Whithouse was informed that only Phoo Action would be commissioned for a series: regardless of this, Whithouse's pilot episode was broadcast on 18 February 2008.

In spite of the BBC's initial commissioning decision, Being Human proved popular with viewers: however, the show might not have progressed further had not journalist Narin Bahar (of the Reading Chronicle) started an online petition to lobby BBC Three commissioning editors to greenlight a full series. The petition was signed by over 3000 people, and following the collapse and cancellation of the Phoo Action series in pre-production (as it was decided that the scripts for the series were not good enough), Being Human was commissioned as a replacement.

== Subsequent recasting ==
Russell Tovey (George) and Dylan Brown (Seth) were the only cast members from the pilot episode to renew their roles for the first full series, while the roles of Mitchell, Annie, Herrick and Lauren were all recast. This was partially due to the longer-than-usual waiting period between pilot episode and formally committed series (resulting in some of the original actors becoming unavailable) and partially due to a shift in tone for which other actors were better suited.
