= George Sands =

Fictional character from the British television series Being Human

- Being Human character
- First appearance: "Pilot" (2008)
- Last appearance: "Eve of the War" (2012)
- Created by: Toby Whithouse
- Portrayed by: Russell Tovey

In-universe information
- Species: Werewolf
- Gender: Male
- Full name: George Sands, Junior
- Status: Deceased

George Sands is a fictional werewolf in the comedy-drama television series Being Human, portrayed by Russell Tovey. The male lead for the duration of the show's first three series appeared in 24 episodes of the drama, as well as in three Being Human novels.

== Television series ==
=== Prequel ===
In the prequel’s narrative George is on holiday in Scotland with his fiancé Julia. One day George decides to go for a walk, while Julia stays at the hotel. Outside he meets Andy, who joins him. The pair is outside until it is dark, and they suddenly hear a wolf howling. The wolf turns out to be a werewolf, who attacks George and Andy. Andy is killed by the werewolf while George survives. However, George is scratched by the werewolf which turns him into a werewolf too.

=== Pilot ===
After George is infected with the werewolf curse he flees from home and leaves his fiancée Julia without telling her why. He moves to Bristol and starts to work in a hospital as an attendant. After never hearing from George again his family and fiancée Julia believe George is dead. In Bristol George hides that he is a werewolf. He wants to learn how to manage his monthly transformations, so he decides to move into a new home with his friend Mitchell, a vampire who is trying to stay clean from blood. They soon find a nice house, but as soon as they move into their new home they figure out that the ghost Annie is already living in the house. At first George doesn’t like Annie and wants her gone, but they get closer together as time passes. During his work at the hospital George meets his former fiancée Julia again, who is a patient there. When George hears that Julia’s new fiancé Peter beats her, George threatens to kill him, but is stopped by Annie. Julia finally figures out that George is a werewolf, seeing him transform in front of her, but isn’t able to cope with this and leaves him. Meanwhile the three housemates George, Annie and Mitchell have grown closer.

=== Series 1 ===
While living with Mitchell and Annie, George tries to manage being a werewolf. When the werewolf Tully arrives, George is happy to find someone offering to help him manage his condition. However, George soon learns that Tully is the werewolf who infected him. This discovery leads to Tully and George parting company. At the hospital George meets a nurse named Nina and a romantic relationship starts between them. Through all of this, Mitchell’s evil infector Herrick interferes in the trio’s lives. In the end, George transforms into a werewolf and kills Herrick. While he transforms, he also scratches Nina.

=== Series 2 ===
The killing of Herrick unleashes a side of George that he had never shown before. He is looking for a fight and gets involved with a couple of new vampires. George doesn’t see that his girlfriend Nina is feeling bad, a result of him scratching her when transforming into a werewolf. Instead of taking care of Nina, George flirts with the vampire Daisy. When Nina finally reveals her condition to him this brings George back to reality. Nina finally leaves George and he has a hard time getting over this. George gets a new job teaching at a language school where he meets Sam, and falls in love with her. George plans to move into a new flat with Sam and her daughter Molly, but those plans are put aside when Nina returns. Nina tells George, Mitchell and Annie about an organisation called CenSSA. She tells George that this organisation helps him to get rid of his condition once and for all. George is sceptical about this and decides not to join Nina. Instead, he goes to a parents meeting at school, along with Sam. There he starts transforming into a werewolf and manages only to get away within the last second. This makes George realise that being a werewolf is endangering the people in his life, and he decides to go to the CenSSA organisation along with Annie and Nina to finally get rid of his condition. Finally George, Annie and Nina figure out that Kemp, CenSSA's leader, can’t keep what he has promised and that a lot of werewolves are killed during his experiments. For Annie however it is already to late. She is sent to hell by Kemp. Later George, Mitchell and Nina move into a new home in Barry.

=== Series 3 ===
After a long break up Nina and George are together again. They start a new life in a house in Barry. Mitchell is living in the same house and saves Annie from Purgatory, who moves into the friends house. Nina becomes pregnant. For the first time since becoming a werewolf George sees his parents, who thought he was dead. George visits them along with Nina, realises that they have broken up and brings them back together again. Meanwhile Mitchell has killed again. He asks George to kill him and put an end to his life. In the end George kills his friend Mitchell because of mercy.

=== Series 4 ===
George is devastated his love Nina has been beaten to death by vampires, only shortly after she has given birth to their daughter Eve. George spends most of the next month sitting on guard beside his daughter's crib, determined to protect her but emotionally shattered. To save his daughter from the vampires George partially transforms into a werewolf during a non full moon night. He does this by tricking his body into thinking that there is a full moon, granting him the strength needed to kill the vampires who threaten Eve. This saves his daughter but George also dies during the process, as the partial transformation gave him the enhanced strength without giving him the enhanced healing he needed to cope with the damage he was inflicting on himself, his last words being to ask Annie and fellow werewolf Tom MacNair to act as Eve's guardians, which they do. At the end of the series George is joined by his friends Annie, Mitchell, Nina and baby Eve in the afterlife. A reunion scene with the friends is never shown on television.

== Relationships ==
=== Nina Pickering ===
Nina and George are very close to each other. After becoming werewolves they both support each other a lot managing their condition and staying close to humanity. Nina has a calming influence on George, even as a werewolf. Nina is able to rip through the barrier that George has built up because of his own lack of confidence and the insecurity about himself.

=== John Mitchell ===
George Sands and John Mitchell have a deep friendship. They support each other to control their supernatural urges.

=== Annie Sawyer ===
When George meets Annie for the first time he doesn’t like her and wants her to leave. However, the house mates get closer to each other very soon and start to develop a friendship.

== Casting ==
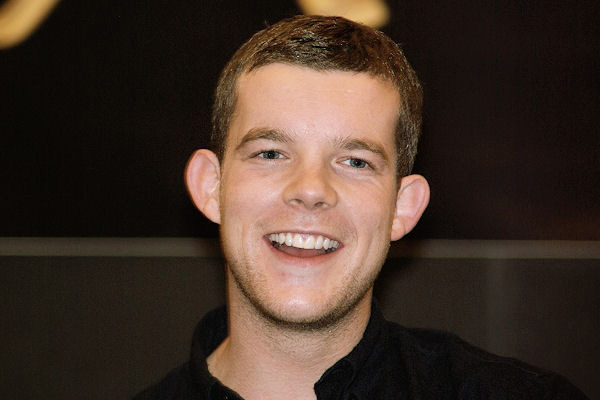
Russell Tovey played George

After the Being Human pilot, almost all the roles were recast. Russell Tovey was the only regular cast member that stayed. He later told in an interview that the George that he played alongside Guy Flanagan (Mitchell - Pilot) and Andrea Riseborough (Annie - Pilot) was different from the George that he played alongside Lenora Crichlow and Aidan Turner, as each actor would respond differently to the character.

== Leaving the series ==
In November 2011 Tovey announced on Twitter that he would leave Being Human. He later said that he would feel strange to film the series without Aidan Turner, who had announced his departure of the series a short time before Tovey. In 2016 at the MCM London Comic Con Russell Tovey said that he would like to film another one-off special of Being Human with his former co-stars Aidan Turner and Lenora Crichlow. He suggested that the special could take place in the after life.

== Characterisation ==
Originally the BBC asked Whithouse to write a story about three college graduates buying a house together. In Whithouse's early ideas George was a man with anger management issues. He was very punctilious, old fashioned and romantic. George had his own travel agency. At his office there was a girl who was in love with him. However, George turned out to be a werewolf.

George is born as George Sands Junior. He has an extraordinarily high IQ and is Jewish. George has a lot of self doubts and moral qualms. He struggles a lot with being a werewolf. Monica Germanà believes that he tries to separate his supernatural self from the human one, when he speaks about himself as a werewolf using the pronoun "he" instead of him. However, it is also demonstrated that this is not possible as George also shows some supernatural abilities, like enhanced smell, when he is not transformed. According to Deborah Mutch George is the most human of the three housemates. He becomes only monstrous once a month. Therefore, he "represents the moral center of the series".

== Reception ==
Hollywood.com thinks that “Tovey manages to be nerdy and anal retentive but dead sexy.” as George. Brent Hartinger from Logo TV feels that Russell Tovey’s George is a “very fussy, neurotic character, and he’s also extremely adorkable”. Matt Roush from TV Guide says that George is played touchingly by Russell Tovey.

In 2010 and 2012 Russell Tovey was nominated as best actor for playing George Sands by the SFX magazine. In 2011 George was listed on place 33 of SFX's Top Sci-Fi Icons list, in front of such characters as Hermione Granger, Sam Winchester, Sarah Jane Smith, Xena, Sookie Stackhouse, Damon Salvatore, Fox Mulder, Iron Man, Indiana Jones, Jack Sparrow, Jean-Luc Picard or Gandalf.

In 2011 Tovey won SFX magazine’s Cult Hero award for playing George.

== See also ==
- List of fictional werewolves
