= John Mitchell (Being Human) =

Fictional character from the TV series Being Human

- Being Human character
- Aidan Turner as John Mitchell in Being Human
- First appearance: "Pilot" (2008)
- Last appearance: "The Wolf-Shaped Bullet" (2011)
- Created by: Toby Whithouse
- Portrayed by: Aidan Turner
- Other portrayals: Guy Flanagan ("Pilot")

In-universe information
- Species: Vampire
- Gender: Male
- Born: 29 July 1893
- Status: Deceased

John Mitchell is a fictional vampire in the comedy-drama TV series Being Human, portrayed by Guy Flanagan in the pilot and afterwards by Aidan Turner. The male lead for the duration of the show's first three series appeared in 23 episodes of the drama, as well as in three Being Human novels.

== Television series ==
=== Background ===
In the series narrative, Mitchell is a soldier during the First World War when he meets the vampire Herrick. Herrick offers to spare the lives of Mitchell's platoon if Mitchell will allow him to turn him into a vampire; Mitchell agrees, and becomes Herrick's vampire companion.

In the ensuing decades, he joins Herrick and is known by other vampires for his brutality and cruelty. In the 1960s Mitchell and Herrick kill several people in a flat. When Mitchell is hiding from the police, he meets a young woman named Josie. Mitchell spares Josie's life, and she helps him to abstain from blood for the next years. As time passes, a romantic relationship develops between the pair, but they eventually go their separate ways. When the werewolf George Sands is attacked by two vampires, Mitchell saves his life and the two become friends.

=== Pilot ===
In the Pilot's narrative Mitchell is a vampire who works with his werewolf friend George in a hospital, where they both have a menial job. Mitchell wants to abstain from blood-drinking. He thinks that he needs someone who supports him with this difficult task. That is why he decides to move into a new home, along with his werewolf friend George. As soon as Mitchell and George move into the room they figure out that a ghost of a young woman named Annie is already living in the house. While his friend George doesn't like Annie, Mitchell instantly feels a connection towards her and wants her to stay in the house. In the hospital he starts an affair with his co-worker Lauren. When they have sex Mitchell is unable to control his blood-lust and kills Lauren. Mitchell feels guilty and tries to save her by turning her into a vampire. Lauren's personality changes, and she seems to enjoy being a vampire and drinking blood. She joins Mitchell's infector Herrick and the vampire Seth who plan to take over the world, along with other vampires.

=== Series 1 ===
While Mitchell tries to live a life close to humanity Mitchell's infector Herrick doesn't accept that and tries to interfere in Mitchell's life. Mitchell's infectee Lauren tells Mitchell that she is also wrestling with her newfound blood-lust. She adds that she wants to stay clean and asks Mitchell to help her. Mitchell tries to do so but isn't very successful in the process. Being unable to cope with her transformation into a vampire and her deeds, Lauren begs Mitchell to kill her. Mitchell stakes her. After this Mitchell returns to Herrick and joins the vampire community. When Mitchell tries to find Herrick he stumbles upon a cellar in which humans are held in a horrible condition as food sources for the vampires. Mitchell now knows that he has to defeat Herrick. However, it is Herrick who attacks Mitchell first and hurts him badly. Mitchell needs more strength to defeat Herrick. His friend Josie, who is a patient at the hospital, asks him to drink her blood to get stronger again. She is deadly sick and would die anyway. Mitchell does so. Afterwards he meets Herrick and arranges a fight. However, in the end it is George who kills Herrick during his transformations.

=== Series 2 ===
Mitchell falls in love with Lucy, a female doctor at the hospital, he has been working at. Unknowing to Mitchell Lucy Jaggat works along with priest Kemp in an organization, called CenSSA which tries to heal werewolves by destroying the evil gene. Mitchell is forced to finally reveal to Lucy that he is a vampire, which Lucy already knows. Meanwhile, Mitchell has also other things to deal with. Since Herrick has died the vampire community has no leader anymore and is beginning to fall into chaos. Even though Mitchell doesn't want to he is forced to take over the new leadership of Bristol's vampires. Mitchell decided to launch a Blood Addicts society to keep the vampires clean from blood. Kemp and Lucy make further plans to get rid of what they see as the evil in the world. They set up an explosion in the bar where Mitchell's Blood Addicts society takes place. This leads to the death of most of the vampires in the community. When Lucy's role in this is revealed, Mitchell is devastated. His darkest vampire traits start to come out. Mitchell and his vampire friend Daisy kill twenty people in a train massacre. Meanwhile, George, Annie and George's ex-girlfriend and werewolf Nina have gone into Lucy's CenSSA organisation. Too late they figure out that Kemp can't keep what he has promised and that a lot of werewolves are killed during his experiments. When Mitchell hears that his friends are at the company, he goes there, killing everyone on his way. He meets George and Nina again. However, for Annie it is already too late. She is sent to hell by Kemp. Later George, Mitchell and Nina move to Barry. When Annie is stuck on the other site at purgatory and Mitchell promises to get her back.

=== Series 3 ===
Mitchell saves Annie from Purgatory, which makes Annie fall in love with Mitchell and Mitchell develops some feelings for her too. However, their luck is overshadowed by Mitchell's guilt of his deeds as a vampire, most importantly his recent kills at the train massacre. He also doesn't tell his friends about this. Furthermore, Mitchell has heard from a prophecy that he would be slain by a werewolf. Mitchell tries to find his murderer which is not easy since he lives with two werewolves (Nina and George). When his resurrected infector Herrick arrives at their home Mitchell wants to get to know how Herrick managed to get back to life, so that he can be resurrected as well. However, not even his new girlfriend and love Annie can help to prevent this prophecy from happening. In the end it is Mitchell who asks his friend George to kill him out of mercy, which also prevents him from killing more people or being a henchman of the vampire Wyndam. George does as his friend wished him to do.

=== Series 4 ===
At the end of the series Mitchell is joined by his friends Annie, George & Nina and their baby Eve in the afterlife, as all of them have died until the end of the series. A reunion scene with the friends is never shown on television.

== Relationships ==
=== George Sands ===
John Mitchell (Aidan Turner) and George Sands have a deep friendship. George tries to help Mitchell to stay clean from blood, while Mitchell wants to help George to cope with being a werewolf. Furthermore, Mitchell also helps George with other things like setting up a date between George and Nina. Mitchell also worries about George after George has killed Herrick. Mitchell knows what the killing means and doesn't want his friend to change.

=== Annie Sawyer ===
Mitchell and Annie have a strong connection towards each other. As a vampire and a ghost, they both do not age, and they have both died. For Mitchell, Annie means stability. Annie is not going to leave him, and she sees the good in Mitchell. Over the past few years many people have stopped seeing that in Mitchell, that is why it is so important for him. After he has been running away from being a vampire for such a long time, Annie looks after him, which he needs.

== Casting ==
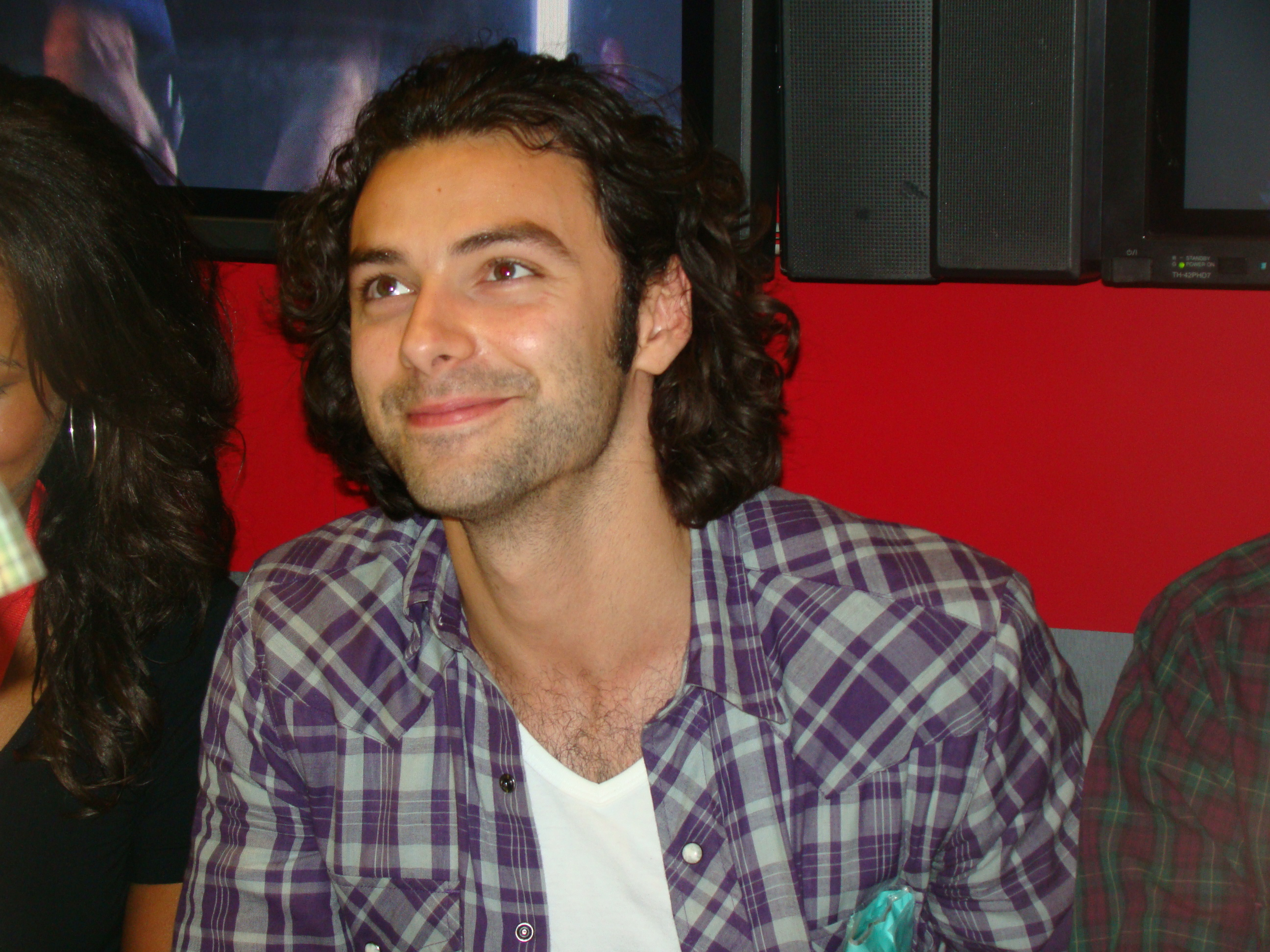
Aidan Turner played Mitchell

Guy Flanagan was cast as Mitchell in the Being Human Pilot. The pilot was broadcast in 2008. When Andrea Riseborough announced that she wouldn't be available for an upcoming series of Being Human, the producers had to do a recasting. This way also the dynamic of the main characters would change, which made the production crew rethink their previous casting choices. Creator Toby Whithouse later said that the pilot vampires were a “bit too Anne Rice” for his liking. So it was decided to change the actors of the pilot's vampires, including Mitchell. Actor Gregg Chillin read for Mitchell but was later cast as Owen. When Aidan Turner got a call from his agent about auditioning for a new drama Being Human, Turner's initial reaction was to turn the offer down. He didn't know what to make of the show's concept, which sounded bizarre to him. As soon as he got the script, Turner's opinion of the show changed. He auditioned for the role and got it a few time later. The changing of the actor of Mitchell changed not only the personality of Mitchell, but also of the characters around him. Russell Tovey said in an interview that the George that he played alongside Guy Flanagan (Mitchell - Pilot) and Andrea Riseborough (Annie - Pilot) was different from the George that he played alongside Lenora Crichlow and Aidan Turner, because each actor would respond differently to the character.

== Leaving the series ==
When Aidan Turner got offered a role in the movie series The Hobbit as Kíli he decided to leave the series. The production team could not contract actors for more than one season and had to renegotiate with the actors after each series. So creator Toby Whithouse knew before that at some point Aidan Turner would leave the series. To prepare for this Whithouse wrote a sequence in series two where Aidan's character Mitchell would kill many innocent people in a train. Whithouse knew that would be the reason why the character would have to leave, whether it would happen at the end of series three or later. The script of the series had three different possible endings. One of them was that Mitchell gets back to Bolivia with the other vampires. Aidan Turner however thought it was appropriate for the Mitchell's ending that he would be killed and so it was filmed this way. If Aidan would return in some point during the next series Mitchell would only be seen in flashbacks. When Mitchell would have stayed in the series, one possible story would have been that Mitchell would have become the main villain in series four. In 2016 at the MCM London Comic Con Turner said that he is up for another one-off special of Being Human with his former co-stars Russell Tovey and Lenora Crichlow.

== Characterization ==
Originally the BBC asked Whithouse to write a story about three college graduates buying a house together. In Whithouse's early ideas John Mitchell was a sex-addicted man. He was working in a call centre and had a string of opportunist relationships. In the end Mitchell turned out to be a vampire who has difficulties controlling his bloodlust. According to Mark Oakley Mitchell is scared of the creature within him but can't prevent him from coming out from time to time. After having killed many people since he had become a vampire, Mitchell does not want to harm anymore. The guilt of his deeds has just become too much for him. According to Monica Germanà Mitchell's addiction to blood shows similarities to alcohol addiction. Sometimes Mitchell believes he has a choice, whether he kills or not. For example, when he tells his infector Herrick, that he doesn't want to join the vampire community because he chooses humans. Other times he has doubts about the existence of a free will when he claims to have no choice. Then his killings are justified by an "overwhelming need". Whenever Mitchell tries to stop killing people or drinking blood, it is motivated by the idea of love. His "self-consciousness [sic?] about his emotions and questions of ethical responsibility that construct him as a moral animal."

Alessandra Stanly describes Mitchell as charming and handsome. He has no trouble attracting women.

== Reception ==
Even though Guy Flanagan got replaced by Aidan Turner after the Pilot, both actors were praised for their portrayal.

=== Guy Flanagan (Pilot) ===
Vanessa Randolph from Fruitless Pursuits enjoyed Guy Flanagan's performance as Mitchell. According to her Guy “brought an otherworldly quality to Mitchell” that she “couldn’t see being replicated, an ‘oldness’ and romance associated with vampires.” When she heard that Flanagan would leave the show, she was devastated. Matt from thecustardtv.com praises the three distinctive leads with their own unique moral dilemma. He describes Guy Flanagan’s Mitchell as a “laconic, icy vampire who is eaten up with blood-curdling guilt” when he kills humans, drinking their blood. Werewolf-Movies.com believes that Mitchell is "a cool-as-ice vampire". Diana Kingston-Gabai thinks Guy Flanagan as Mitchell plays his role very well. She loved Flanagan's “more sardonic, constantly-bemused performance and his chemistry with the co-stars” and was sad that he was replaced with Aidan Turner. Daniel Martin from The Guardian thinks that Guy Flanagan's Mitchell was too stylised and too vampiric. So he believes it is good that he got replaced by Aidan Turner. Andrew Smith believes that Guy Flanagan's Mitchell is much cooler and quieter than Aiden Turner's which turns Mitchell more into a stoner than a brooding heartthrob.

=== Aidan Turner ===
Hollywood.com thinks that Mitchell “channels his inner-rock-god as the guy you know you shouldn’t like but you do.”. Mark Oakley from Den of Geek said that by playing Mitchell Aidan Turner shows what an awesome actor he is “adding dramatic weight, a credible romantic interest and a smattering of leading man about him when necessary." Brent Hartinger from Logo TV feels that Aidan Turner as Mitchell is "very easy on the eyes".

According to Robert Moore from PopMatters Mitchell is the most compelling character of the show and should be ranked within the "shortest of short lists of great TV vampires". Robert Moore thinks Mitchell is a fascinating character in the same league as Joss Whedon's Spike or Angel. Mitchell committed unspeakable horrors which forces the viewers to think about whether Mitchell is beyond redemption and if he could be anything else besides inhumanly cruel, even if he wants to change. Moore loves that the series, unlike many others, doesn't give an easy answer to this question.

In 2011 and 2012 Aidan Turner was nominated as best actor and sexiest male for playing John Mitchell by the SFX magazine. In 2009 Mitchell was listed on place 21 of SFX's Top Vampires of all Time list, in front of such characters as Barnabas Collins, Eric Northman or Louis de Pointe du Lac. According to SFX Mitchell is "another in a long line in conflicted vampires", however his optimism sets him apart. While the other vampires mope he smiles and tries to make the best of things. In 2011 Mitchell was listed on place 60 of SFX's Top Sci-Fi Icons list, in front of such characters as Ron Weasley, Sam Winchester, Rory Williams, Xena, Sookie Stackhouse or Gandalf.

== See also ==
- List of fictional vampires
