= Annie Sawyer =

- Being Human character
- Lenora Crichlow as Annie Sawyer in Being Human
- First appearance: Pilot episode (2008)
- Last appearance: "The War Child" (2012)
- Created by: Toby Whithouse
- Portrayed by: Lenora Crichlow
- Other portrayals: Andrea Riseborough (Pilot)

In-universe information
- Full name: Anna Clare Sawyer
- Born: 1985
- Died: 2007 (aged 22)
- Condition: Ghost

Anna Clare "Annie" Sawyer is a fictional character in the comedy-drama television series Being Human, portrayed by Lenora Crichlow. The female lead for the duration of the show's first four series, Crichlow appears as Annie in thirty-one episodes altogether, more than any other character in the series. She also appeared in three Being Human novels.

Within the series narrative, Annie is a ghost haunting the house she lived in with her fiancé whilst she was alive. Prior to the first episode, she is joined by George Sands (a werewolf) and John Mitchell (a vampire), who are able to see her because of their own supernatural conditions. The extent of Annie's visibility to humans varies depending on her mood and her confidence. Annie's eyes turn blue when she is visible to humans, and violet when she is haunting. She always appears in the clothes she was wearing when she died, which change subtly depending on her state of mind.

Annie's storylines have involved her coming to terms with her own death, avoiding death's door and being trapped in purgatory, in addition to several doomed attempts at romance. After losing Mitchell, the love of her life, and friends George and Nina, Annie becomes a mother figure to Eve (George and Nina's daughter) and new werewolf and vampire housemates, Tom and Hal respectively. Annie is written out of the show at the conclusion of series four in which—having made a difficult decision—she averts a dark future for mankind and is able to move on to the afterlife.

== Appearances ==
The first series premiere (2009) establishes Annie as being unable to remember her death. She believes ex-fiancé Owen's (Gregg Chillin) claims that she fell down the stairs accidentally. Annie frustrates George (Russell Tovey) because of her temperament and her tendency to constantly make tea she cannot drink, though Mitchell (Aidan Turner) is more sympathetic towards her. In the third episode, he introduces Annie to Gilbert (Alex Price), another ghost, who falls in love with her. When Owen arrives to clear a blocked pipe and produces a thong, Annie's memories of her death are triggered and shown in flashback. Owen had pushed her down the stairs after an argument; their relationship had been abusive, not the loving one she had imagined to be true. Memories of her death cause Annie to become a poltergeist able to move objects and turn machines on without touching them although she cannot control these abilities. To resolve her death Annie seeks a confession from Owen; he taunts her haunting effects as ineffectual and reveals that he was unfaithful throughout their relationship. Annie is inspired by her and George's rescue of Mitchell from a vampire coven and with their help stands up to Owen. After Owen has a mental breakdown and confesses, the Door to Death appears for Annie but she stays behind because her friends need her. In the final episode, a more confident Annie shows the ability to teleport further distances and greater powers of telekinesis, which she describes as "a whole new skill set."

In series two (2010), Annie has a greater physical presence due to her inner strength and happiness; she is seen by normal humans and able to get a job in a bar. However, after a flirtatious relationship with Saul (Alex Lanipekun) he attempts to assault her which leaves her distressed. Her employer Hugh (Nathan Wright) expresses his affection; Annie states she will wait until she feels ready to reciprocate. After Saul dies Annie is confronted by his spirit which attempts to drag her through the door of death. Though she escapes the trauma causes her to lose her physical presence, her job and the possibility of a relationship with Hugh. When George is dumped by Nina (Sinead Keenan), Annie encourages him out of his depression by enlisting his help in helping set Hugh up with his ex-girlfriend. After another brush with a malevolent spirit — or Gatekeeper — trying to take her through the door, Annie is taught defence skills by the ghost Sykes (Bryan Dick) including how to close these doors and read the auras of others. In the sixth episode of the series Annie encounters her mother Carmen (Jacquetta May) for the first time since her death, and with the aid of a psychic is able to tell her to move on. The series finale sees Annie sent through a Door to the other side by Kemp (Donald Sumpter). She manages to return briefly through another door, exacting revenge on Kemp and saving Nina's life by dragging the former to the other side with her. Following this second disappearance, she appears on George, Nina and Mitchell's television explaining her situation in the afterlife as 'complicated' and excessively bureaucratic.

Series three (2011) begins with Mitchell entering purgatory and rescuing Annie from being sent to hell. Annie is overwhelmed with joy at being reunited with her friends, who have now relocated to Barry Island in south Wales, and in a closing monologue states that it was only after death that her life truly began. Overwhelmed with gratitude to Mitchell, Annie begins to fall for him and appoints herself as his guardian angel. Despite initial hostility Annie strikes up a friendship with the Type-4 'zombie' Sacha (Alexandra Roach) and is upset at her death. Inspired by Sacha's message to 'seize the day' Annie confesses her romantic feelings towards Mitchell; he reciprocates and the pair kiss. Attempts by the pair to establish a sexual relationship are unsuccessful and Mitchell admits to Annie that he's content to have a non-physical relationship with her. Annie takes an interest when DS Nancy Reid (Erin Richards) visits the residence to investigate the Box Tunnel 20 massacre. Though distraught at realising the culprit is Mitchell, Annie goes as far as to kill a vampire attempting to kill Reid in a cover up and tells Mitchell that he has to face punishment. When Mitchell returns to ask George to kill him, he bids farewell to Annie with the words "You are the love of my long life", a sentiment she reciprocates. When Wyndham, a vampire 'Old One' arrives to announce a new age ruled by vampires he implies that Annie is a lot stronger than she imagines.

In the fourth series premiere "Eve of the War" (2012) Annie is worried by George's paranoia and despondency following Nina's murder. After sacrificing his life to save his daughter Eve — whom it is prophesied will save the world — he entrusts Annie and young werewolf Tom (Michael Socha) to look after her. Following on from this Annie and Tom receive a visit from the dying werewolf Leo (Louis Mahoney) and his housemates Pearl the ghost (Tamla Kari) and Hal the vampire (Damien Molony). After Annie helps Pearl admit her feelings for Leo the two depart for the afterlife together, leaving the vampire Hal dependent on Annie and Tom. From Pearl, Annie learns to "swaddle" baby Eve meaning both can leave the house undetected. When the sinister ghost Kirby (James Lance) is sent from the afterlife to kill the baby he splits the household up. Annie initially trusts his intent but he erodes her sense of purpose causing her to vanish. However Annie wills herself back and is able to kill Kirby's spirit by touch just as he has a knife over Eve's head. After helping new ghost Emrys (Anthony O'Donnell) pass on through his door after she accidentally killed him, Annie is contacted by the ghost of Eve's future self (Gina Bramhill) who asks Annie to accompany her into purgatory. Annie is shown a dystopian future where vampires rule supreme and humans and werewolves are rounded up in concentration camps and forced into dogfights. Eve reveals that in this alternate future Annie "faded" away after watching her remaining friends die. When Annie asks Eve what needs to be done to avert this future she is told that she needs to kill Eve as a baby. Annie at first resists this command, killing Nick Cutler (Andrew Gower) when he tried to kill Eve to bring down the vampires. However, after the vampire leader Mr Snow (Mark Gatiss) explains that Eve's survival will ensure that an effective resistance against the vampires will never form, Annie detonates a bomb killing Eve and the vampire Old Ones. Arriving in purgatory with baby Eve, Annie has a brief conversation with future Eve who fades away, the future having been averted. Annie enters another door where it is implied she will be reunited with George, Mitchell and Nina.

== Casting and characterisation ==
Andrea Riseborough originally portrayed the character of Annie in the pilot episode; when a full series was commissioned she was replaced with Lenora Crichlow. Although Crichlow initially felt the script was "a bit out there" she was won over by the story's grounding in real life. In her eyes, Annie is initially "quite insecure and vulnerable, and a little bit needy" but as the series progresses "she has to start to toughen up and prove herself". Crichlow explains that although originally it seemed like the other characters were responsible for Annie, "she is forced to move on and forced to grow up" as the series progresses. By the fourth series Annie's "sense of duty and responsibility is what drives her" as she takes on a mothering role to both Eve and Tom. Actor Damien Molony explains how this is also replicated in Annie's relationship with Hal, who "absolutely looks up to her". Molony feels that Annie's subordination of tasks helps protects Hal from his own vampiric nature. The character was written out of the series at the end of the fourth series. In a video posted to the BBC's Being Human website Toby Whithouse explains that he felt the character had "come to a natural end". Crichlow was satisfied that the character went out saving the world and stated: "I don't know if there's much more for her to do, if I'm honest."

Robin Roberts is reflecting Annie's role as a female ghost. He describes Annie as a very important and strong female character. Throughout the series she helps numerous ghost to resolve their issues on Earth and to pass over in the Afterlife. Saul, a man whom Annie has been dating is unable to drag Annie into a door, she doesn't want to go. Furthermore, she is not only portrayed as physically strong but also emotionally, when she tells George to talk about his feelings after he and his girlfriend Nina have broken up. She tells him that depression is anger which is turned inward. Later the plot shows that Annie, and the "women's way of knowing is correct". In the series the female ghost is used "to model an alternative to patriarchal control and violence". According to Roberts fantasy TV series often promote superpowers as something that is used to "dominate and kill". Annie's role in the series shows a "feminist alternative". Throughout season four Annie's power grows even stronger. She is able to stop the evil vampires who try to destroy the world, and who have taken her adoptive daughter Eve. When she screams at them "Give me back my fucking baby", they all freeze. They are petrified by her power. According to Roberts Annie shows how a female power can develop into a super power.

=== Original plan ===
Originally the BBC asked Whithouse to write a story about three college graduates buying a house together. In Whithouse's early ideas Annie was an agoraphobe. She was a little bit scatty, eccentric, lacking in confidence and a borderline agoraphobic. Annie wanted to get work as a copywriter and was much more settled into humanity. Despite being bright and funny, Annie still loved an idiot ex-boyfriend.

== Reception ==
Dan Martin of The Guardian notes that Crichlow's Annie wasn't welcomed by the audience at first, after replacing Andrea Riseborough from the pilot episode, but opines that Crichlow "brings a kookier vulnerability to Annie that makes her journey far more sympathetic." Matt Roush from TV Guide, described Annie as a "friendly ghost" who is "so much more appealing than her Syfy counterpart". Neela Debnath of The Independent feels that Annie works as a comic character through Crichlow's exploitation of her "pedantry and neurotic tendencies". Digital Spy's Morgan Jeffrey praised Annie's role in the fourth series remarking that "the perky ghost's continued presence helped to smooth the transition" between old and new regulars. He felt that retaining the character and using her in this fashion was "a canny move."

In a 2012 poll conducted by SFX Magazine to find the 100 sexiest female characters in science fiction and fantasy Annie was voted number sixty-two.

== See also ==
- List of ghosts
