= Guy Flanagan =

British actor

- Born: 1980; New Longton, Lancashire, England, UK
- Occupation: Actor
- Years active: 2002–present

Guy Nicholas Flanagan (born 1980) is an English actor, best known for portraying John Mitchell in the pilot episode of Being Human.

== Background ==
Born in New Longton, Lancashire, Flanagan attended Cardinal Newman College, and went on to train at Drama Centre London. Flanagans mother Poppy Flanagan is also an actress, she previously worked as a teacher.

== Career ==
After graduating from drama school, Flanagan joined the Royal Shakespeare Company, playing Oswald in the RSC Academy production of King Lear. His other theatre work includes Cymbeline and Mimi and the Stalker.

Flanagan has appeared in the films Millions (2004), Stoned (2005) and A Bunch of Amateurs (2008).

Flanagan played the lead role of John Mitchell in the pilot episode of Being Human; the character was played by Aidan Turner in the subsequently produced series. His other television credits include Messiah: The Harrowing, Holby City, Totally Frank, Doctors and The Bill.

== Filmography ==
=== Television ===
Year	Show	Role	Notes
2003	Henry VIII	Tall servant	Television serial
2005	Messiah: The Harrowing	Tim Evans	Television film
2006	Holby City	Trev Stone: Passing On (2006)	Medical drama
2006	Totally Frank	Callum: Episode 2.1 (2006)	Comedy drama
2007	Party Animals	Felix Carrera: Episode 1.3 (2007)	TV series
2008	Being Human	John Mitchell: Pilot (2008)	Supernatural drama
2009	Doctors	Lance Bright: Towards the Light (2009)	Soap opera
2009	The Bill	Jason Devlin: Conviction: Cover Up (2009); Conviction: To the Limit (2009); Conviction: Breaking Point (2009); Conviction: Walk the Line (2009); Conviction: Riot City (2009); Conviction: Judgement Day (2009)	Police procedural
2009	Shameless	Raymondo: Episode #6.16 (2009)	Comedy drama
2013	The White Queen	James Friars: Episode 04 (2013)	Historical drama
2013	A Touch of Cloth	Animal: Undercover Cloth: Part One (2013); Undercover Cloth: Part Two (2013)	Comedy police procedural

=== Film ===
Year	Show	Role	Notes
2004	Millions	All Saint 3	Feature film
2005	Stoned	Dino	Feature film
2008	A Bunch of Amateurs	Box Office Guy	Feature film
2008	In Transit	Hans	Feature film
2009	Together	Brother	Short film
2010	Meet Pursuit Delange	Jonty McInnes	Short film
2012	Dark Shadows	Bearded Hippie	Feature film
2012	Hammer of the Gods	Jokul	Feature film

== Theatre ==
Year	Production	Venue(s)	Role
2002	King Lear	Swan Theatre / Young Vic / Spain, Italy, France	Oswald
2007	Cymbeline	Barbican Centre	Iachimo
2008	Mimi and the Stalker	Theatre503	Larson / Barnes
