= Being Human (British TV series) =

British supernatural TV series (2008–2013)

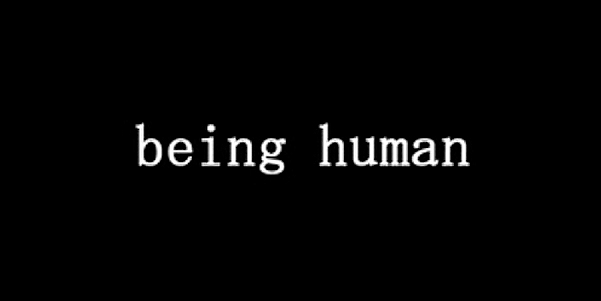
- Genre: Horror; Supernatural fiction; Comedy drama
- Created by: Toby Whithouse
- Starring: Lenora Crichlow; Russell Tovey; Aidan Turner; Sinead Keenan; Michael Socha; Damien Molony; Kate Bracken; Steven Robertson
- Composer: Richard Wells
- Country of origin: United Kingdom
- Original language: English
- No. of series: 5
- No. of episodes: 37 (list of episodes)

Production
- Executive producers: Koei Karpe; Toby Whithouse
- Producer: Matthew Bouch
- Production locations: Series 1–2: Bristol, England; Series 3–5: Barry, Wales
- Cinematography: Tim Palmer (pilot); Nic Morris (series)
- Running time: 58 minutes
- Production company: Touchpaper Television

Original release
- Network: BBC Three
- Release: 18 February 2008 – 10 March 2013

Related
- Becoming Human (Spin-off); Being Human (North American TV series)

Being Human is a British supernatural comedy-drama television series created and written by Toby Whithouse and first broadcast on BBC Three in 2009. The show blends elements of flatshare comedy and horror drama. The initial pilot episode starred Andrea Riseborough as Annie Sawyer (a ghost), Russell Tovey as George Sands (a werewolf), and Guy Flanagan as John Mitchell (a vampire) – all of whom are sharing accommodation and attempting as well as they can to live a "normal" life and blend in with the ordinary humans around them, striving to fit in more.

Two of the main cast were replaced in the series by Aidan Turner (Mitchell) and Lenora Crichlow (Annie). Russell Tovey was the only original main cast member. In the third series, Sinead Keenan became part of the main cast as Nina Pickering (a werewolf). In the fourth series, the ensemble was joined by Michael Socha as Tom McNair (a werewolf) and Damien Molony as Hal Yorke (a vampire). The fifth series added Kate Bracken as Alex Millar (a ghost). The first two series were set in Totterdown, Bristol, and the third series onwards relocated 25 miles (40 km), across the River Severn, to Barry, Wales.

On 13 March 2011, series creator Toby Whithouse announced that Turner had left the show and that new characters would be introduced. On 11 November 2011, Tovey announced that he was leaving Being Human after the first episode of Series 4 to work full-time on his other television series Him & Her. Furthermore, Keenan announced on 9 January 2012 that she had not filmed any scenes for Series 4, and would exit the show off-screen.

The series is one of the most popular shows on BBC's iPlayer. The second series premiered on BBC Three on 10 January 2010. The third series launched on 23 January 2011. The day following the final broadcast for Series 3, the BBC announced a fourth series would premiere on the BBC in 2012. Series 4 began airing on BBC Three on 5 February 2012. The BBC Media Centre announced a fifth series had been commissioned, which started broadcasting on 3 February 2013. The BBC announced on 7 February 2013 that the fifth series would be the last. The final episode of Being Human was broadcast on 10 March 2013.

== Plot ==
The central premise of Being Human is that various types of supernatural beings exist alongside human beings, with varying degrees of menace; that three of these supernatural beings are opting to live amongst human beings rather than apart from them; and that these three characters are attempting (as much as is possible) to live ordinary human lives despite the pressures and dangers of their situations. They are constantly threatened with exposure or persecution, with pressure from other supernatural creatures, and with problems caused by their attempts to deal with their own natures.

=== Series 1 (2009) ===
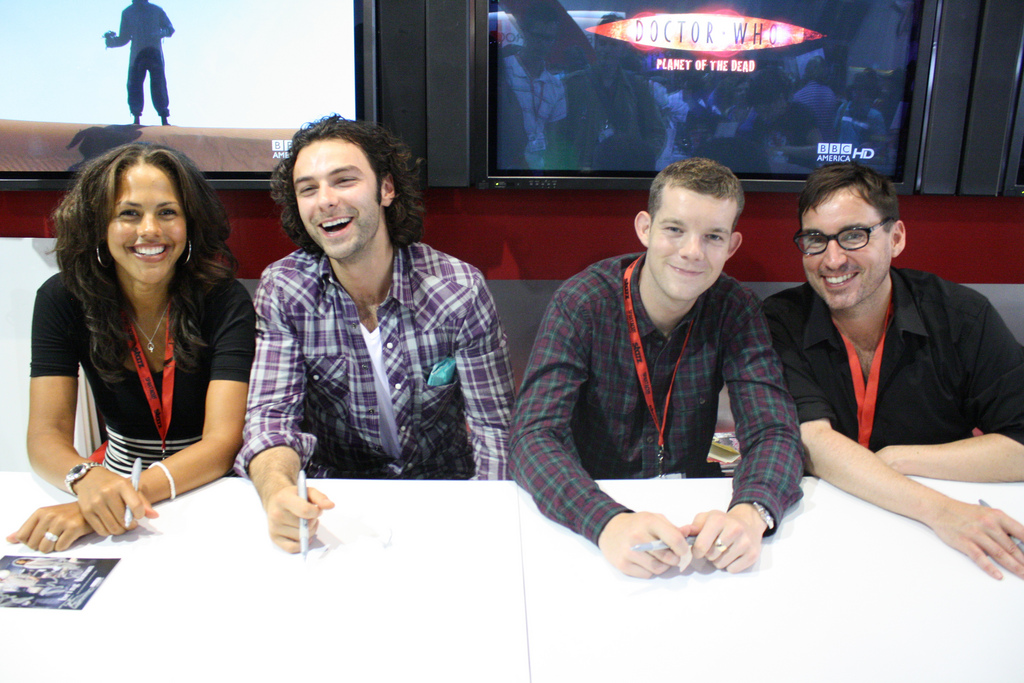
Being Human cast (from left to right, Lenora Crichlow, Aidan Turner, Russell Tovey) and the series creator, Toby Whithouse

Series 1 is set in the English city of Bristol and introduces George Sands (a reluctant werewolf in his mid-twenties) and John Mitchell (a vampire with the appearance and behaviour of a young man in his mid-twenties, but who is in fact over a hundred years old). Both are attempting to reject their natures as supernatural predators – George by strictly managing his transformations and their effect on others, Mitchell by abstaining from blood-drinking. Despite a long history of antipathy between the werewolf and vampire races, Mitchell and George have formed a deep friendship, they have low-profile, low-status jobs as hospital porters and live as housemates.

Moving into a new house together, they discover that it already has an occupant – Annie Sawyer, the ghost of a young woman in her mid-twenties. Annie had lived in the house with her fiancé Owen but died after falling down the stairs. She has remained to haunt the property while Owen, unaware of her presence, has rented it out to Mitchell and George. As supernatural beings, George and Mitchell can see, touch and communicate with Annie, who is delighted to have their company and becomes the third member of the surrogate family.

All three have problems. Mitchell's central challenge is his struggle with his desire to feed (which is presented as being similar to a struggle against drug addiction). George's is to manage his monthly werewolf transformations in such a way that he does not kill anyone or pass on the werewolf affliction. He considers his condition to be "a curse", over which he is in a certain state of denial (including referring to his wolf-self as if it were a different person). Annie's challenge is to deal with her new existence as a ghost (including the isolation and loneliness which results from it) and to discover the reason why she has remained on Earth instead of passing over to the afterlife.

The remainder of Series 1 deals with the protagonists' attempts to deal with these situations and with the various characters (human or otherwise) with whom they come into contact or conflict. All of the problems are finally brought to a ferocious climax which the trio survive but with their existence no less precarious.

=== Series 2 (2010) ===
George in his werewolf form

Series 2 (also set in Bristol) deals with the aftermath of Series 1. Mitchell must struggle with the dual responsibilities of managing his own urges and attempting to manage the now scattered and rudderless Bristol vampire community. George must cope with the responsibilities of intimacy and the problem of having passed on his "curse" despite his best efforts. Annie must find a new purpose in her continued presence (having resolved the initial issues that kept her on Earth) and must also deal with the malignant attention of another type of supernatural being, resident in the afterlife but able to influence events in the earthly world.

The lives of Mitchell, George, and Annie are further complicated by other new factors. There is now a need to fit George's girlfriend Nina into the household, and deal with urgent new problems she is facing herself; there are problems with the police, and two powerful and playful vampires (Ivan and Daisy) have arrived in Bristol with the threat of causing mayhem. The trio are also subject to the growing attentions of a mysterious organisation (possibly called the Centre for the Study of Supernatural Activity, or CenSSA) led by the scientist Dr Jaggatt and the priest-administrator Kemp. This organisation has identified and classified the three different types of supernatural creature – vampire, werewolf and ghost – and is continuing to research them, although it is evident from the start that they are quite prepared to let subjects die in the course of the research. The lives of each of the four main protagonists gradually draw them closer and closer to the organisation, despite the threat it may pose to all of them.

=== Series 3 (2011) ===
Series 3 saw the protagonists move to Barry Island in South Wales (as the result of events in Series 2). They set up house in a former bed-and-breakfast hotel and attempt to resume their "normal" lives, despite the overhang of the results of the Series 2 climax, including Mitchell having briefly snapped and murdered twenty people on a train in the Box Tunnel, in Wiltshire. As Series 3 progresses, the quartet must deal with the return of various figures and events from the characters' pasts as well as the complications of their relationships, notably after George and Nina conceive a child in their werewolf state and must determine what their child will be. In addition, they must deal with further supernatural incursions – more vampires (including a teenager and a pair of suburban swingers), a zombie girl and a pair of werewolves, Tom McNair and his adoptive father (who have set themselves up as vampire hunters). Events lead up to a finale that leaves the household changed dramatically. Aidan Turner left the show at the end of the third series, which also marked the final appearance of Sinéad Keenan as Nina.

=== Series 4 (2012) ===
Nina has been killed in a vampire attack and the gang now has to take care of baby Eve, whose werewolf heritage appears to have attracted the attention of vampire overlords known as the Old Ones. In the first episode George dies while rescuing Eve, leaving her in the custody of Tom (who moves into Honolulu Heights) and Annie. Another trio of elderly werewolf Leo, ghost Pearl and vampire Hal later come to Honolulu Heights seeking help for Leo's transformations after a strange experience, but in the end Leo dies, passing on with Pearl while Hal remains to become the new vampire at Honolulu Heights. Lawyer Nick Cutler, a vampire created by Hal in 1950, plans to expose werewolves as part of a larger plan involving a vampire conquest of Earth. Cutler tries to get Hal back to his old ways of drinking blood, Tom and Annie learning that Hal is actually a former Old One and vampire ruler, with Cutler's efforts eventually succeeding in breaking Hal down. The blood sends Hal into overdrive and he repulses Alex, whom he is dating, with his crude and unusual behaviour when they meet for a second date. Alex leaves angrily but is followed by one of Cutler's men. Meanwhile, Eve, from the future, reveals to Annie that in her future, most of humankind are dead or living in concentration camps and vampires now rule every inch of the world. Annie is shocked to learn that Hal is the ruthless leader of the new vampire revolution. To save the world, Eve asks Annie to kill her when she is a baby. Cutler reveals Alex's dead body drained of blood as revenge for Hal murdering his wife in similar fashion in 1950. Cutler then locks Hal up, but Alex returns as a ghost and helps Hal escape. The Old Ones then arrive in Barry. To save the world, Annie blows up Eve and the Old Ones, completing her unfinished business, and "passes over" as she is no longer an Earth-bound spirit. The series ends with Hal, Alex, and Tom living together in Honolulu Heights.

=== Series 5 (2013) ===
On 26 March 2012, the day following the Series 4 finale, it was revealed that Series 5 of Being Human would air in 2013 and comprise six episodes. Michael Socha and Damien Molony were announced to be reprising their roles as Tom and Hal respectively. Lenora Crichlow did not return for Series 5 as the production team felt her storyline had reached a natural conclusion. Kate Bracken confirmed her return to the show in an interview before the series started shooting. The BBC referred to Alex (Kate) as "our new ghost", implying that Alex would become a main character in Series 5.

On 17 January 2013, the series synopsis was released, explaining that Alex would be adjusting to life as a ghost with Tom while Hal tries to keep his bloodlust in check, and they decide to take up jobs at the Barry Grand Hotel. The three must deal with Mr. Rook, a government agent whose job is to keep the truth about supernatural beings from the public, and a pensioner named Captain Hatch (Phil Davis) who is secretly a vessel for the Devil. The fifth series of Being Human was announced to be the final series on 7 February 2013; the final episode was broadcast on 10 March 2013.

== Episodes and home video ==
Series	Episodes	Originally released	
Series	Episodes	First released	Last released
Pilot		18 February 2008	
1	6	25 January 2009	1 March 2009
Special		28 March 2009	
2	8	10 January 2010	28 February 2010
3	8	23 January 2011	13 March 2011
4	8	5 February 2012	25 March 2012
5	6	3 February 2013	10 March 2013

In October 2011, Netflix announced it had obtained rights to stream episodes of Being Human via its home video service in the United States and Canada.

== Cast and characters ==
=== Main characters ===
Name	Portrayed by	Series				
Name	Portrayed by	1	2	3	4	5
Annie Sawyer	Lenora Crichlow	Main				
George Sands	Russell Tovey	Main			Featured	
John Mitchell	Aidan Turner	Main				
Nina Pickering	Sinead Keenan	Recurring	Main			
Hal Yorke	Damien Molony				Main	
Tom McNair	Michael Socha			Recurring	Main	
Alex Millar	Kate Bracken				Recurring	Main
Dominic Rook	Steven Robertson				Guest	Main

=== Recurring characters ===
Name	Species	Portrayed by	Recurring (Episodes)	Number of episodes
Seth	Vampire	Dylan Brown	Pilot, 1.01–1.06	6
Herrick	Vampire	Jason Watkins	1.01–3.08	13
Lauren Drake	Vampire	Annabel Scholey	1.01–1.05	5
Janey Harris	Human	Sama Goldie	1.01–1.05	4
Owen	Human	Gregg Chillin	1.01–1.06	5
Cara	Vampire	Rebecca Cooper	1.01–3.05	5
Josie	Human	Clare Higgins/Charlene McKenna	1.05–1.06, 2.05	3
Billy	Human	Josef Altin	1.05–1.06	2
Chaplain Mark	Human	Michael Begley	1.06, 2.07	2
Kemp	Human	Donald Sumpter	1.06–2.08	9
Hennessey	Psychic	Adrian Schiller	2.01, 2.07–2.08	3
Ivan	Vampire	Paul Rhys	2.01–2.07	5
Daisy	Vampire	Amy Manson	2.01–2.08	6
Lucy	Human	Lyndsey Marshal	2.01–2.08	8
Lloyd Pinkie	Human	Mark Fleischmann	2.01–2.08	7
Hugh	Human	Nathan Wright	2.01–2.03	3
Saul	Human	Alex Lanipekun	2.01–2.02	2
Quinn	Human	John Stahl	2.02–2.03, 2.07	3
Chief Constable Wilson	Human	Ian Puleston-Davies	2.03, 2.05	2
Campbell	Vampire	Alex Warren	2.04–2.05	2
Sam Danson	Human	Lucy Gaskell	2.04–2.07	4
Molly Danson	Psychic	Molly Jones	2.05–2.07	3
Anthony McNair	Werewolf	Robson Green	3.01–3.08	4
Lia Shaman	Ghost	Lacey Turner	3.01, 3.08	2
Adam Jacobs	Vampire	Craig Roberts	3.02, 4.05	2
Richard Hargreaves	Vampire	Mark Lewis Jones	3.02, 3.04	2
Emma Hargreaves	Vampire	Melanie Walters	3.02, 3.04	2
Nancy Reid	Human	Erin Richards	3.06–3.08	3
Cooper	Vampire	Justin Salinger	3.06–3.07	2
Eve	War Child	Gina Bramhill	4.01–4.08	6
Cutler	Vampire	Andrew Gower	4.01–4.08	7
Fergus	Vampire	Anthony Flanagan	4.01–4.03	3
Leo	Werewolf	Louis Mahoney	4.01–4.02, 5.06	3
Pearl	Ghost	Tamla Kari	4.01–4.02	2
Regus	Vampire	Mark Williams	4.01, 4.03	2
Kirby	Ghost	James Lance	4.03–4.04	2
Allison Larkin	Werewolf	Ellie Kendrick	4.06, 5.06	2
Mr. Snow	Vampire	Mark Gatiss	4.07–4.08	2
Ian Crumb	Vampire	Colin Hoult	5.01–5.04	3
Captain Hatch	Devil	Phil Davis	5.01–5.06	5
Alistair Frith	Human	Toby Whithouse	5.01–5.06	4
Alan	Vampire	Hamza Jeetooa	5.02, 5.04	2

=== Background ===
Creator Toby Whithouse was approached by production company Touchpaper Television to develop a drama series about a group of friends who buy a house together. Whithouse was not enthusiastic about the idea, but came up with three characters, George, Mitchell, and Annie. Touchpaper Television liked the characters so they started developing the project. For months, Whithouse and Touchpaper Television struggled to come up with a storyline for the first episode. Eventually, they had a final meeting to see if they could come up with a storyline or the project would be scrapped. Whithouse came up with the supernatural elements and the characters were changed.

=== Pilot episode ===
Promotional image from the pilot

Whithouse was contacted by the BBC who told him they were making a series of pilots. Whithouse was not a fan of the television pilot process, but believed that the show would never get made otherwise, so the pilot script was submitted. In 2007, Danny Cohen, the controller of BBC Three, commissioned the pilot of Being Human, as well as West 10 LDN, Mrs In-Betweeny, The Things I Haven't Told You, Dis/Connected and Phoo Action pilots as part of the rebranding of BBC Three. Before the pilots were broadcast, Whithouse was told that only Phoo Action would be commissioned for a series. The pilot episode was broadcast on 18 February 2008. The journalist Narin Bahar of the Reading Chronicle started an online petition to lobby BBC Three commissioning editors to greenlight a full series, which was signed by over 3,000 people. Phoo Action was cancelled after it was decided that the scripts for the series were not good enough and Being Human was then commissioned.

=== Casting ===
The pilot episode starred Guy Flanagan as Mitchell the vampire, Andrea Riseborough as Annie the ghost, and Russell Tovey as George the werewolf, as well as featuring Adrian Lester as Herrick (the vampire leader and main antagonist of Series 1), Dylan Brown as Seth (another vampire) and Dominique McElligott as the recent vampire convert Lauren (converted by Mitchell). With the exception of George and Seth, these parts were recast when the series went into full production.

=== Filming ===
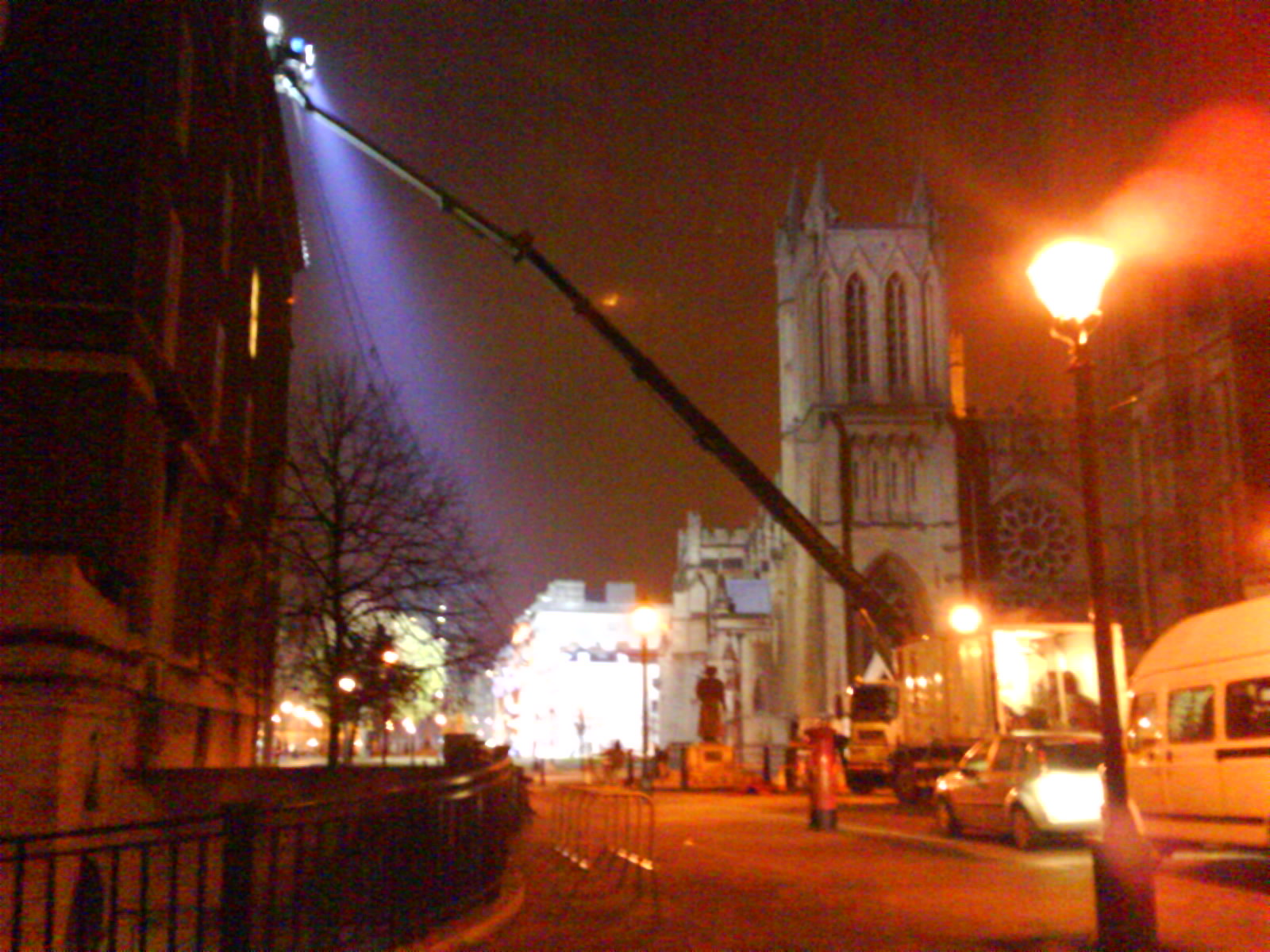
Lighting trucks at Being Human film shoot, College Green, Bristol

The first and second series were set and filmed in Bristol featuring views of Clifton Suspension Bridge and Clifton Village. Windsor Terrace, Totterdown, Bristol, was the location of Mitchell, Annie, and George's home and the pub shown in the pilot. Scenes set at the hospital where Mitchell and George work were filmed in and around Bristol General Hospital and Glenside, Bristol.

The third series was filmed and set in Barry (Barry Island). The new house is located on Canon Street. Some filming took place in Hensol Woods near Cowbridge, Vale of Glamorgan, in July 2010. The move to Barry Island and Wales was prompted by the BBC's "Out of London" project, which sought to move productions away from London and to new production facilities in Northern Ireland, Scotland, and Wales. Some interior filming occurred at an abandoned bus depot, which had been converted into a film studio.

On 13 March 2011, Whithouse and BBC Three announced that Being Human would return for a fourth series. Eight 60 minute episodes were commissioned and co-produced with BBC America. The producer also said some old characters would return, and he intended to introduce new ones and that the characters will continue to live on Barry Island. The filmmakers returned to Barry Island to film the fourth series in late July 2011, where they continued to use local man Gary Rowe's house as the group's bed-and-breakfast base of operations. Students from the drama and theatre programme at Coleg Gwent were used as extras and in minor roles on the show. The internal and external cafe scenes were filmed in the Pillgwenlly area of Newport.

== Reception ==
The pilot episode was not widely reviewed, and some reviews were not positive. A review in The Daily Telegraph called the pilot one of BBC Three's "wildly uneven" new shows. Brian McIver, writing for the Daily Record felt the show lacked sex appeal and that the plot was boring, concluding: "so what?" But, by late January 2009, the Daily Record reported that most of the reviews of the pilot had raved about the new show. Viewership for the pilot was very high, and a massive online petition drive helped turn the pilot into a series.

Reception of the series has been extremely favourable. Stephen Armstrong in The Guardian gave the show a warm review, noting that its primary appeal was not supernatural or horror. It was, he wrote, "a curious genre mash-up drama about a ghost, werewolf and vampire sharing a flat in Bristol, which deals more with the horror of living in modern Britain than the horror of the undead." David Belcher writing in the Glasgow Herald was effusive, however, calling the series "Easily the sole good programme on BBC3... Being Human: the supernatural drama that's super in its depiction of human nature." At the conclusion of the first series, Andrea Mullaney of The Scotsman had high praise for the show's premise and writing:

"The series started well and seemed to get better almost every week. By last night's conclusion, it had matured into a marvellously enjoyable and surprisingly affecting show, which turned its punchline of a premise into a metaphor for everyday struggles to make connections, overcome their selfishness and insecurities and to live a decent life... Remarkably un-clichéd and well written by Toby Whithouse, this was hugely better than most other British attempts at genre shows – the ropey Torchwood, the dreadful Demons and even most recent episodes of Doctor Who."

When it debuted on BBC America in 2009, the show won similar plaudits. The Miami Herald's Glenn Garvin praised the show's balance of humour and pathos: "What it is darkly funny, deeply affecting and utterly cockeyed, a work that celebrates life by dwelling on death, love by abiding loneliness. It's a tale of cold, dead noses pressed up against the window pane of humanity... But for all the laughs, Being Human never loses sight of the menace of its characters." Writing in The New York Times, Alessandra Stanley called the series "compelling" and praised its equal emphasis on horror, remorse, and humour:

"Three young friends share a shabby apartment in Bristol, England, as well as secrets, and those sound like the set-up to a corny joke – a vampire, a ghost and a werewolf walk into a bar. Only in this case the bar is a pub and there is no punch line. Being Human takes the killing – and the perpetrators' anguished remorse – seriously, but still manages to find the humour in their predicament as these monsters in human form struggle to blend into normal, almost Seinfeldian life that includes work, going out on dates and having the tedious neighbours over for drinks... All three characters are highly appealing, but the charm of the show lies in the delicate balance of engrossing drama and disarming humour; the series is not campy or self-conscious, it's witty in an offhand, understated way."

Writing for the Chicago Tribune, Mary McNamara lauded the show's humour, but emphasised its moral seriousness and metaphorical nature. "[D]espite more than a few laugh-out-loud moments, Being Human is no sitcom, no Will & Grace with monsters," she wrote, "Creator Toby Whithouse takes all the themes associated with the cursed and the damned very seriously, and if his exploration of them is less baroque than other franchises, it promises to be even more effective. Addiction is the obvious comparison, and Whithouse makes it nicely – the relationship between John and Lauren (Annabel Scholey), the woman he hopes is his last victim, plays like classic junkie love."

The praise continued throughout various periods of the series' run. Matt Roush from TV Guide, having given critical plaudits to the third series, said of the series, "Can't recommend it highly enough." Reviewing the Series 3 Blu-ray release, the Wichita Falls Times-Record-News noted, "So many movies and TV programmes will suggest how evil people can be and how much characters can suffer. Being Human actually can make viewers feel something of that horror and awfulness." Melinda Houston, writing for the Sydney Morning Herald, applauded the way the show took the common television theme of the "disenfranchised... suddenly retaliat[ing]" and inverted it. "Moving beyond the teen tropes, it sets itself squarely in a mire of 20-something Gen Y angst. Being special and having power has no upside; being different is a burden and a nuisance and all anyone wants is a life of ordinariness."

=== Awards and nominations ===
The show was nominated for Best Drama Series at the 2010 British Academy Television Awards, but lost to Misfits. It was nominated for the same award again in 2011, but lost to Sherlock.

Being Human was crowned Best Drama Series at the 2011 TV Choice Awards and Best Television Drama Series at Writers' Guild of Great Britain Awards in 2009, 2010 and 2012.

Year	Award	Category	Recipient(s)	Result	Ref.
2010	British Academy Television Awards	Best Original Television Music	Richard Wells	Nominated	
2010	British Academy Television Awards	Best Drama Series	Rob Pursey, Matthew Bouch, Toby Whithouse, Colin Teague	Nominated	
2011	British Academy Television Awards	Best Drama Series	Rob Pursey, Philip Trethowan, Toby Whithouse, Colin Teague	Nominated	
2010	Broadcasting Press Guild Awards	Best Drama Series	Rob Pursey, Matthew Bouch, Toby Whithouse, Colin Teague	Nominated	
2012	Irish Film & Television Awards	Best Director Television Drama	Daniel O'Hara	Nominated	
2009	Royal Television Society	Best Tape and Film Editing: Drama	Philip Hookway	Won	
2009	Royal Television Society	Best Special Effects	Being Human	Won	
2010	SFX Awards	Best TV Show	Being Human	Nominated	
2010	SFX Awards	Breakout of the Year	Being Human	Won	
2010	SFX Awards	Best Monster/Villain	Jason Watkins	Nominated	
2010	SFX Awards	Best Actor	Russell Tovey	Nominated	
2011	SFX Awards	Best TV Show	Being Human	Nominated	
2011	SFX Awards	Best TV Episode	"Damage"	Nominated	
2011	SFX Awards	Best Sci-Fi Actress	Lenora Crichlow	Nominated	
2011	SFX Awards	Best Sci-Fi Actor	Aidan Turner	Nominated	
2011	SFX Awards	Sexiest Male	Aidan Turner	Nominated	
2011	SFX Awards	Cult Hero	Russell Tovey	Won	
2012	SFX Awards	Best TV Show	Being Human	Nominated	
2012	SFX Awards	Sexiest Male	Aidan Turner	Nominated	
2012	SFX Awards	Best Actor	Aidan Turner	Nominated	
2012	SFX Awards	Best Actor	Russell Tovey	Nominated	
2013	SFX Awards	Best TV Episode	"Making History"	Nominated	
2013	SFX Awards	Biggest Disappointment	The Cancellation of Being Human	Nominated	
2013	SFX Awards	Best TV Show	Being Human	Nominated	
2013	SFX Awards	Sexiest Male	Damien Molony	Nominated	
2013	SFX Awards	Best Actor	Damien Molony	Nominated	
2009	TV Quick Awards	Best New Drama	Rob Pursey, Matthew Bouch, Toby Whithouse, Colin Teague	Nominated	
2011	TV Quick Awards	Best Drama Series	Toby Whithouse	Won	
2009	Writers' Guild of Great Britain	Best Television Drama Series	Toby Whithouse	Won	
2010	Writers' Guild of Great Britain	Best Television Drama Series	Toby Whithouse	Won	
2012	Writers' Guild of Great Britain	Best Television Drama Series	Toby Whithouse, Tom Grieves, John Jackson, Lisa McGee, Jamie Mathieson	Won	
2011	Glamour Awards	TV Actress of the Year	Lenora Crichlow	Won	

=== Ratings and social media ===
Being Human garnered "some of the largest audiences in the network's history" when it debuted on BBC America in 2009, and again during its second series run in 2010.

In March 2011, the BBC announced that live, delayed, and online viewership for the launch of Being Human's third series was 1.8 million viewers, the largest viewing audience for a series premier in BBC Three history. The average viewership per episode was 1.4 million viewers on television, with an additional 400,000 viewers via the show's release on iPlayer. The network also revealed that Becoming Human's finale, which aired on BBC Three rather than online, received more than 1.5 million viewers on television and iPlayer.

In August 2011, the BBC's Director of Television, George Entwistle, revealed that Being Human had 330,000 Facebook fans, compared to 2.3 million for the Facebook pages of EastEnders and 220,000 for Springwatch. Two months later, the website InsideSocialGames.com reported that Utinni Games was developing a social network game based on the show, in which players can create their own character and participate in an extensive, constantly evolving storyline set in the show's universe.

== Spin-offs and remake ==
=== North American remake ===
A remake of the series produced by Muse Entertainment Enterprises aired on Space in Canada and Syfy in the U.S. in 2011. The first series comprised 13 episodes. A second series premiered on 16 January 2012, and a third series premiered on 14 January 2013. On 25 February 2014 it was announced that the show was coming to an end. The final episode aired on 7 April 2014.

=== Becoming Human ===
The BBC commissioned an online extension called Becoming Human, which was launched midway through the transmission of the third series. Becoming Human stars Craig Roberts as teenage vampire Adam, Leila Mimmack as werewolf Christa, and Josh Brown as ghost Matt, the three working together to solve Matt's recent murder.

=== Books ===
In 2010, BBC Books published the first set of Being Human books, set at some time during Series 2.

#	Title	Author	Published	ISBN
01	The Road	Simon Guerrier	4 February 2010	ISBN 978-1-84607-898-9
02	Chasers	Mark Michalowski	4 February 2010	ISBN 978-1-84607-899-6
03	Bad Blood	James Goss	4 February 2010	ISBN 978-1-84607-900-9

=== Audiobooks ===
There are three audiobooks read by the actors of the series. The audiobook The Road is read by Lenora Crichlow (Annie). The audiobook Chasers is read by Russell Tovey (George), and Bad Blood is read by Lucy Gaskell (Sam Danson).
The Road and Bad Blood are available on audio CD.

#	Title	Author	Read by	Length	Published (download/cd)	ISBN (audio download)	ISBN (audio cd)
01	The Road	Simon Guerrier	Lenora Crichlow	5 hours 38 minutes	7 November 2012/16 April 2013	ISBN 9781471305115	ISBN 9781620647240
02	Chasers	Mark Michalowski	Russell Tovey	5 hours 18 minutes	1 November 2012/15 April 2013	ISBN 9781471305252	ISBN 9781471305283
03	Bad Blood	James Goss	Lucy Gaskell	6 hours 45 minutes	1 November 2012/15 May 2013	ISBN 9781471305290	ISBN 9781471305306

=== Soundtracks ===
In 2011, a soundtrack was released for Being Human that contained music from Series 1 and Series 2. The music was composed by Richard Wells, and featured a track listing of 24 songs. A soundtrack for the third series was released on 25 March 2013. It featured 48 minutes and 25 tracks of music composed by the same composer.

Soundtrack Series 1 & 2
#	Title
1	Being Human
2	Ancestors
3	Annie's Theme
4	A Wonderful Thing
5	Box Tunnel Massacre
6	Gilbert's Door
7	Resurrection
8	Spread a Little Joy
9	Best Night Ever
10	It's Coming
11	Leaving
12	Molly
13	Beautiful Chaos
14	Blood Addicts
15	Someone Else
16	Catacombs
17	Lucky
18	A Second Chance
19	Vampire Annihilation
20	Who's Laughing Now?
21	Holding On
22	Annie's Door
23	Nina and George
24	Full Moon

Soundtrack Series 3
#	Title
1	Drawn Together
2	Time Wasting
3	Thank You
4	Place Your Bets
5	Richard
6	Mitchell and Annie
7	Boy Running
8	Sasha's Door
9	Gotcha
10	Breaking Up
11	Wolf Shaped Bullet
12	Werewolf Attack
13	Awakening
14	Tit For Tat
15	Arrested
16	Intrigue
17	Graham's Death
18	Together
19	Chicken
20	It Hurts
21	Big Secrets
22	Dad's Story
23	Rescue
24	You Made Me Human
25	Age of Vampires

== See also ==
- List of ghost films
- Vampire film
- List of vampire television series
