= Gregg Chillin =

British actor and writer (born 1988)

Gregg Chilingirian
- Born: Gregg Chilingirian; 15 December 1988 (age 36); Cambridgeshire, England
- Occupation(s): Actor, writer, director
- Years active: 2001–present

Gregg Chilingirian (born 15 December 1988) better known by his stage name Gregg Chillin, is a British actor, director and writer born in Cambridgeshire.

== Early life ==
Gregg Chilingirian was born in December 1988 in Cambridge to parents of Armenian descent.

== Career ==
Chillin is notable for his role as ruthless vampire Domenico in SKY, HBO and AMC's A Discovery of Witches.

He has appeared in many television shows over the years, including as Zoroaster da Peretola in David S. Goyer's TV series Da Vinci's Demons. Owen in the first series of BBC Three's Being Human, BBC One's Inside Men, Waking the Dead and Zen playing the character of Pepe Spadola alongside Rufus Sewell.

He provided the voice of Ron Weasley in several of the Harry Potter video games.

Chillin made his stage debut at the Royal National Theatre playing Mark in Dennis Kelly's DNA in 2008.

Chillin played Lord Ingtar Shinowa in The Wheel of Time.

In 2023, he made his debut as a director with the eleven-minute short film George, for which he also wrote the screenplay and starred in one of the main roles, that of the eponymous George.

== Filmography ==
=== Film ===
Year	Title	Role	Notes
2002	Epstein's Night	Jochen Epstein	
2003	Little Wolf's Book of Badness	Sanjay (voice)	
2006	A Good Year	Hip Hopper #1	
2010	4.3.2.1.	Manuel	
2010	Huge	Kayvan	
2011	Freddy Frogface	Victor (voice)	
2012	Twenty8k	Ricky	

=== Television ===
Year	Title	Role	Notes
2001	The Green-Eyed Monster	Renato	Television film
2002	The Queen's Nose	Jack	6 episodes
2003	Star	Mitch	
2004	The Mysti Show	Rob	2 episodes
2004, 2006	The Bill	Trey Harper / Michael Holmes	2 episodes
2005	If...	Mickey	Episode: "If... TV Goes Down the Tube"
2006	Jackanory	Prince Sohrab	Episode: "The Magician of Samarkand"
2007	Holby City	Satnam Patel	Episode: "Close Relations"
2007	Nearly Famous	Ash Chopra	6 episodes
2008	Waking the Dead	Nabil	Episode: "Sins: Part 1"
2009	Being Human	Owen	5 episodes
2010	Pulse	Rafee Hussein	Television film
2011	Aurelio Zen	Pepe Spadola	Episode: "Vendetta"
2012	Inside Men	Riaz	4 episodes
2012	Kidnap and Ransom	Mahvir Mehta	3 episodes
2012	Leaving	Jonah	3 episodes
2013	The Last Witch	Daniel Herrick	Television film
2013–2015	Da Vinci's Demons	Zoroaster	27 episodes
2016	Scott & Bailey	SCAS Neil Simpson	3 episodes
2017	Still Star-Crossed	Mercutio	Episode: "In Fair Verona, Where We Lay Our Scene"
2018	Dark Heart	Dr. Luke Paul	3 episodes
2018–2022	A Discovery of Witches	Domenico Michele	20 episodes
2019	Queens of Mystery	Tobias Young	2 episodes
2020	Absentia	Mubin	2 episodes
2021	The One	Nick Gedny	7 episodes
2022	Harmonica	Shavi	5 episodes
2023	The Wheel of Time	Lord Ingtar Shinowa	6 episodes
2023	COBRA	Nate Stevens	6 episodes

=== Video games ===
Year	Title	Role	Notes
2001	Harry Potter and the Philosopher's Stone	Ron Weasley, Fred Weasley, George Weasley, Raymond	
2002	Harry Potter and the Chamber of Secrets	Ron Weasley	
2004	Harry Potter and the Prisoner of Azkaban	Ron Weasley	
2005	Harry Potter and the Goblet of Fire	Ron Weasley	
2007	Harry Potter and the Order of the Phoenix	Gang Member #1, Ravenclaw Students	
2011	Harry Potter and the Deathly Hallows – Part 2	Additional voices	
2012	Harry Potter for Kinect	Ron Weasley	
2019	Anthem	Trooper Remnant	

=== Theme park ===
Year	Title	Role	Notes
2005	SpongeBob SquarePants 4-D	American Extra	
