= Aidan Turner =

Irish actor (born 1983)

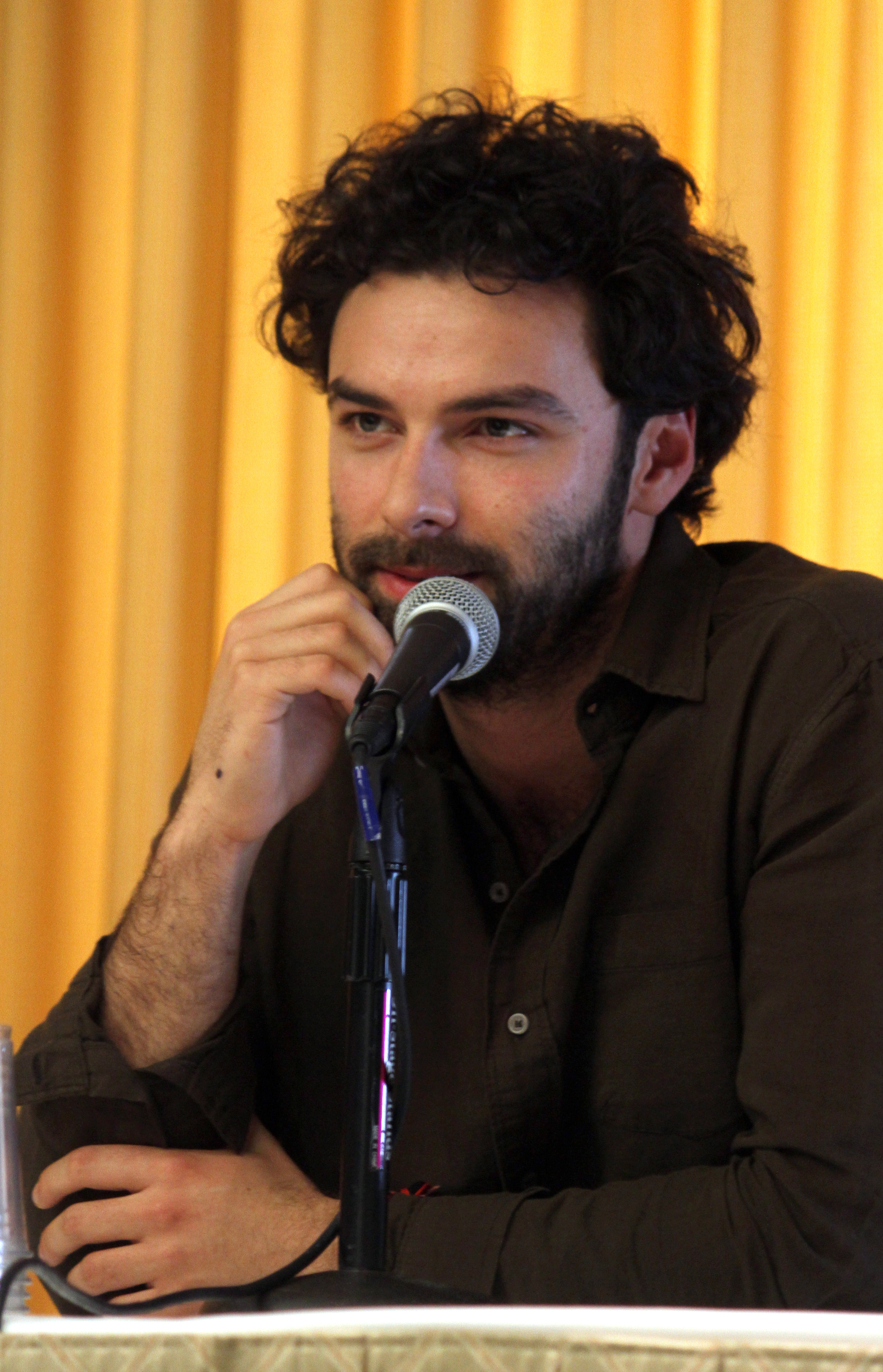
- Turner in 2013
- Born: 19 June 1983 (age 43); Clondalkin, Dublin, Ireland
- Occupation: Actor
- Years active: 2005–present
- Spouse: Caitlin FitzGerald (m. 2020)
- Children: 1

Aidan Turner (born 19 June 1983) is an Irish actor. He began his career in the RTÉ medical drama The Clinic (2008–2009) and the BBC Two series Desperate Romantics (2009). He later gained attention for co-starring as one of the main leads in the popular BBC Three series Being Human (2009–2011), and for playing the dwarf Kíli in Peter Jackson's The Hobbit trilogy (2012–2014), before starring as Ross Poldark in Poldark (2015–2019).

== Early life and education ==
Aidan Turner was born at home in Clondalkin, a suburban town of Dublin, on 19 June 1983. The family later moved to Walkinstown.

Turner attended secondary school at St Mac Dara's Community College in Templeogue before leaving to join his older brother at Firhouse Community College, where, he said, he "probably wasn't a great student".

Before becoming an actor, Turner was a successful ballroom dancer, once obtaining third place in the adult section of the Irish National Championships. After finishing secondary school, he briefly worked as an apprentice electrician, alongside his father. After he saw a notice up in Dublin's Gaiety School of Acting, and having become interested in acting while working in a cinema, he applied. He graduated from the Gaiety School of Acting in 2004.

== Career ==
After graduating from drama school, Turner appeared in several theatre productions, including The Plough and the Stars, Romeo and Juliet, and A Cry from Heaven.

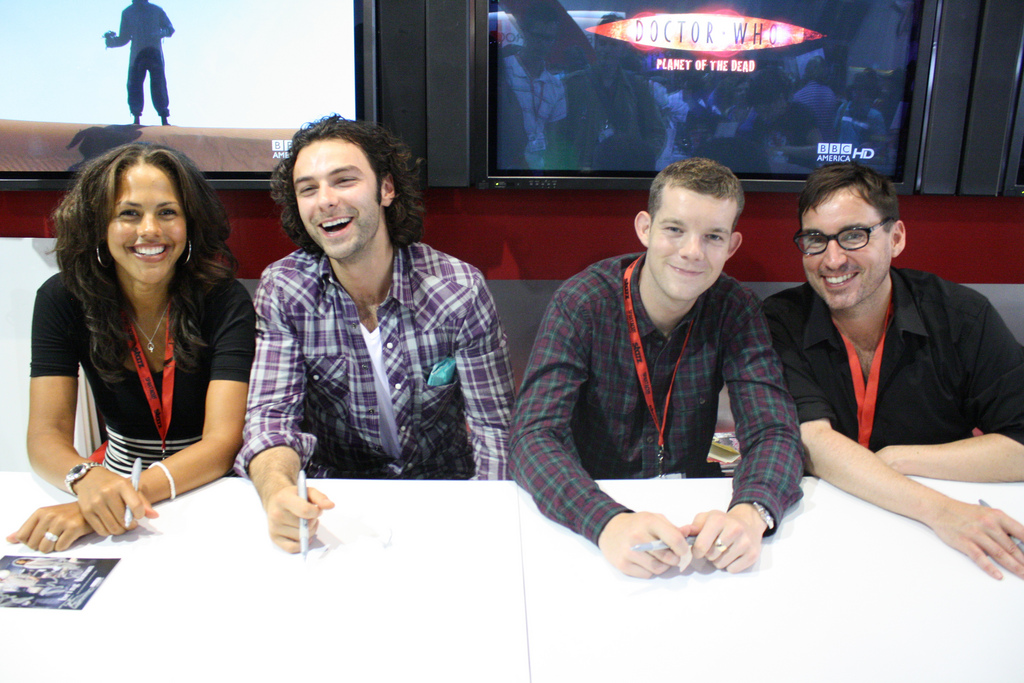
Turner (second from left) with his Being Human castmates Lenora Crichlow and Russell Tovey, and creator Toby Whithouse (right) in 2009

Turner's television acting career began in 2007 with an uncredited appearance on the first episode of The Tudors. In the same year he produced and starred in the film Porcelain, directed by Gavin Cleland, which was shot in a convent in Dublin. However, only a trailer of the movie was released.

Between 2008 and 2009, Turner had a recurring role as Ruairí McGowan in eighteen episodes of The Clinic. He followed The Clinic with the BBC production Desperate Romantics. He portrayed Dante Gabriel Rossetti in all six episodes of the show, which aired in 2009.

Turner's film career began with two short films, The Sound of People and Matterhorn, both in 2007. He later played Mal in the thriller feature film Alarm (2008).

Turner played the vampire John Mitchell for the first three series of the supernatural drama programme Being Human (2009 to 2011), for which he received widespread praise. His role on Being Human brought Turner to the attention of Sir Peter Jackson, who cast him as the dwarf Kíli in The Hobbit Trilogy (2012–2014). In 2014, he won the Empire Award for Best Male Newcomer for the second film in the series, The Desolation of Smaug.

In 2013, Turner portrayed shadowhunter-turned-werewolf Luke Garroway in the film adaptation of Cassandra Clare's The Mortal Instruments fantasy series. He acted opposite Lily Collins, Jamie Campbell Bower, Lena Headey, Robert Sheehan, and Jonathan Rhys.

In the 2015 BBC TV miniseries And Then There Were None, based on the Agatha Christie novel, Turner played the cynical mercenary Philip Lombard. Joining him in the ensemble cast were Maeve Dermody, Miranda Richardson, Toby Stephens, Charles Dance, Anna Maxwell Martin, Noah Taylor, Douglas Booth, Burn Gorman, and Sam Neill. The miniseries was critically-acclaimed, with Maureen Ryan (Variety) and Mike Hale (New York Times) among those applauding Turner's "standout" work.

Turner performed the title role of Ross Poldark in the 2015 revival of the BBC series Poldark. At the National Television Awards in 2016, Turner received the NTA's inaugural Impact Award for his performance.

In 2021, Turner led the Italian series Leonardo, portraying the titular artist. The following year saw him in the ITV police procedural The Suspect, in which he played Dr Joseph O'Loughlin, a psychologist adjusting to his recent diagnosis of early-onset Parkinson's disease.

Turner next played Glenn Lapthorne, a professional tennis coach accused of sexually abusing his former underage protégé (portrayed by Ella Lily Hyland), in the 2023 British television drama Fifteen-Love.

In 2024, Turner played TV journalist Declan O'Hara in the Disney+ series Rivals, an adaptation of Jilly Cooper's Rutshire Chronicles. He starred alongside David Tennant, Victoria Smurfit, Alex Hassell, Bella Maclean, Nafessa Williams, Katherine Parkinson, and Danny Dyer. The second season of the series premiered in May 2026.

== Personal life ==
In 2017, Turner met actress Caitlin FitzGerald. He also bought an 18th-century house in East London that year. The couple married in August 2020; they have a child together, born in January 2022. Turner is a longtime snooker enthusiast.

== Acting credits ==
Key
†	Denotes projects that have not yet been released

=== Film ===
Year	Title	Role	Notes
2007	The Sound of People	Father	Short film
2007	Matterhorn	Theodoro	Short film
2007	Porcelain	Kevin	Unreleased
2008	Alarm	Mal	
2012	The Hobbit: An Unexpected Journey	Kíli	
2013	The Mortal Instruments: City of Bones	Luke Garroway	
2013	The Hobbit: The Desolation of Smaug	Kíli	
2014	The Hobbit: The Battle of the Five Armies	Kíli	
2016	The Secret Scripture	Jack Conroy	
2017	Loving Vincent	Boatman	
2018	The Man Who Killed Hitler and Then the Bigfoot	Young Calvin Barr	
2019	Love Is Blind	Russell	
2023	Paso Doble	Liam Riley	Short film directed by Heida Reed
TBA	The Way of the Wind †	Saint Andrew	Post-production
TBA	Grendel †	Unferth	Pre-production

=== Television ===
Year	Title	Role	Notes
2007	The Tudors	Bedoli	Episode: "In Cold Blood"
2008–09	The Clinic	Ruairí McGowan	Main role, 18 episodes
2009	Desperate Romantics	Dante Gabriel Rossetti	Main role, 6 episodes
2009–11	Being Human	John Mitchell	Main role, 22 episodes
2010	Resonance	TT	Pilot
2011	Hattie	John Schofield	TV film
2015	And Then There Were None	Philip Lombard	Mini series
2015–2019	Poldark	Ross Poldark	Lead role
2021	Leonardo	Leonardo da Vinci	Lead role
2022	The Suspect	Dr. Joseph O'Loughlin	Lead role
2022	Toast of Tinseltown	Barney	Episode: "Death Valley"
2023	Fifteen-Love	Glenn Lapthorne	Lead role
2024–present	Rivals	Declan O'Hara	Lead role
2025–present	The Diplomat	Callum Ellis	Recurring role

=== Theatre ===
Year	Title	Role	Theatre	Location
2005	The Plough and the Stars	Corp. Stoddard	Barbican Theatre	London, United Kingdom
2005	Suddenly Last Summer	Dr. Sugar	Focus Theatre	Dublin, Ireland
2005	A Cry from Heaven	Ardan	Abbey Theatre	Dublin, Ireland
2005	Yokohama Delegation	Hercules	Kilkenny Arts Festival	Kilkenny, Ireland
2005	Titus Andronicus	Demetrius	Project Arts Theatre	Dublin, Ireland
2006	The Crock of Gold	Pan	Olympia Theatre; On tour	Dublin, Ireland; On tour
2006–2007	Drive-By		Cork Mid-Summer Festival; Dublin Fringe Festival 2006; Canterbury Arts Festival 2007	Cork, Ireland; Dublin, Ireland; Canterbury, United Kingdom
2007	La Marea	Adam	Bedrock Theatre Co/DTF	Dublin, Ireland
2007	Cyrano	Christian	Project Arts Centre	Dublin, Ireland
2008	Romeo and Juliet	Paris	Abbey Theatre	Dublin, Ireland
2018	The Lieutenant of Inishmore	Padraic	Noël Coward Theatre	London, United Kingdom
2023	Lemons Lemons Lemons Lemons Lemons	Oliver	Harold Pinter Theatre	London, United Kingdom
2026	Les Liaisons dangereuses	Vicomte de Valmont	Royal National Theatre	London, United Kingdom

=== Audio ===
Year	Title	Role	Notes
2015	A History of Ideas (BBC Radio 4)	Narrator	Twelve short animated videos scripted by Nigel Warburton for BBC Radio 4: "David Hume on Miracles"; "Esse est Percipi ('To be is to be perceived')"; "Karl Popper's Falsification"; "Wittgenstein's Beetle in the Box Analogy"; "I love my mum (but not like that)"; "How Two Halves Make a Whole"; "Love? What's in it for me?"; "Sartre: Love is a hazardous, painful struggle"; "John Locke on Toleration"; "Adam Smith on the Invisible Hand"; "Plato's Philosopher Kings"; "Confucian Ancestor Worship"
2021	The Sandman Act II	Cluracan	Audio drama series by Neil Gaiman based on his comic book The Sandman
2022	The Sandman Act III	Cluracan	Audio drama series by Neil Gaiman based on his comic book The Sandman

== Awards and nominations ==
Year	Award	Category	Work	Result	Ref.
2011	SFX Awards	Best Sci-Fi or Fantasy Actor	Being Human	Nominated	
2011	SFX Awards	Sexiest Male	Being Human	Nominated	
2012	Online Film & Television Association	Best Original Song (Shared with cast)	The Hobbit: An Unexpected Journey	Nominated	
2012	SFX Awards	Best Sci-Fi Actor	Being Human	Nominated	
2012	SFX Awards	Sexiest Male	Being Human	Nominated	
2013	SFX Awards	Sexiest Male	The Hobbit: An Unexpected Journey	Nominated	
2014	Empire Awards	Best Male Newcomer	The Hobbit: An Unexpected Journey	Won	
2014	CinEuphoria Awards	Best Ensemble	The Hobbit: An Unexpected Journey	Nominated	
2015	Radio Times Champion	Drama Champion	Poldark	Won	
2015	TV Choice Awards	Best Actor	Poldark	Nominated	
2016	Broadcasting Press Guild Awards	Breakthrough Award	Poldark / And Then There Were None	Won	
2016	Broadcasting Press Guild Awards	Best Actor	Poldark / And Then There Were None	Nominated	
2016	GQ Men of the Year	Best TV Actor	Poldark	Won	
2016	Irish Film and Television Awards	Best Actor in Lead Role	Poldark	Nominated	
2016	Monte-Carlo Television Festival	Outstanding Actor in a TV Series-Drama	Poldark	Nominated	
2016	National Television Awards	Impact Award	Poldark	Won	
2016	National Television Awards	Drama Performance	Poldark	Nominated	
2016	Radio Times Champion	Drama Champion	Poldark	Won	
2017	Irish Film and Television Awards	Best Actor in Lead Role	Poldark	Nominated	
2017	TV Times Awards	Favourite Actor	Poldark	Nominated	
2017	TV Choice Awards	Best Actor	Poldark	Nominated	
2018	TV Choice Awards	Best Actor	Poldark	Nominated	
2018	Stage Debut Awards	Joe Allen Best West End Debut Award	The Lieutenant of Inishmore	Won	
2019	TV Choice Awards	Best Actor	Poldark	Nominated	
2023	Irish Film and Television Awards	Best Actor in a Lead Role - Drama	The Suspect	Nominated	
2023	Sichuan TV Festival	Best Actor in a Leading Role for a Television Series	Leonardo	Nominated	
2025	Irish Film and Television Awards	Best Actor in a Lead Role - Drama	Rivals	Nominated	
2025	The Gossies	Best Actor	Rivals	Nominated	
