= Russell Tovey =

English actor (born 1981)

- Tovey in 2026
- Born: 14 November 1981 (age 45); Billericay, Essex, England
- Occupations: Actor; playwright; screenwriter; author; podcaster; art collector
- Years active: 1994–present

Russell George Tovey (born 14 November 1981) is an English actor. He is best known for playing the role of werewolf George Sands in the BBC's supernatural comedy-drama Being Human, Rudge in both the stage and film versions of The History Boys, Steve in the BBC Three sitcom Him & Her, Kevin Matheson in the HBO original series Looking and its subsequent series finale television film Looking: The Movie, and Patrick Read in American Horror Story: NYC.

== Early life ==
Tovey was born on 14 November 1981 in Billericay, Essex to Carole. A. (née Haynes) and George. F. Tovey, who ran a Romford-based coach service taking passengers from Essex to Gatwick Airport. Tovey has an older brother, Daniel Peter Tovey. He attended Harold Court School in Harold Wood and Shenfield High School.

Tovey noted that as a boy he "was an avid collector of various things and prone to participating in fads." His parents supported his efforts, taking him to archaeological digs and museums, buying him a metal detector and going to conventions for mineralogists. For a time he wanted to be a history teacher, but after seeing Dead Poets Society, The Goonies, and Stand By Me he decided to be an actor.

== Career ==
=== Acting ===
Tovey began his career as a child actor. He joined a local drama club and garnered the attention of a talent agent. He worked from the age of 11 and missed so much school that his father suggested he should cut back, but his mother persuaded his father to let their son continue. His TV career started in 1994, when he was cast in Mud, a children's series broadcast on CBBC.

He left secondary school at the age of 16 and started a BTEC in performing arts at Barking College. He was expelled after a year for refusing a role in the school play in favour of a paying acting job. He acted in plays in Chichester under the direction of Debra Gillett, wife of Patrick Marber. He met Marber through Gillett, and Marber cast him in the play Howard Katz at the National Theatre. He also performed in His Girl Friday and His Dark Materials there.

In 2004, he took the role of Rudge in Alan Bennett's play The History Boys at the Royal National Theatre as well as touring to Broadway, Sydney, Wellington and Hong Kong and playing the role in the radio and film adaptations. He originally auditioned for the role of Crowther but agreed to act the part of Rudge after Bennett promised to beef up the role. Insecure because he had not attended drama school as many of his peers had, he enrolled in numerous workshops and readings offered by the National Theatre.

In spring 2007, Tovey had a recurring role in the BBC Three comedy Rob Brydon's Annually Retentive, playing Rob's producer, Ben. He played Midshipman Alonso Frame in the 2007 Doctor Who Christmas Special "Voyage of the Damned". Russell T. Davies, the show's executive producer and lead writer, had suggested Tovey as a future replacement for David Tennant, before it was announced that the Eleventh Doctor would be played by Matt Smith. Tovey reprised his role as Midshipman Alonso Frame in the 2009-10 Doctor Who Christmas special, "The End of Time".

Tovey played werewolf George Sands, one of three supernatural housemates in the drama Being Human. The pilot premiered on BBC Three on 18 February 2008. A six-part series was commissioned with the first episode broadcast on 25 January 2009. Tovey left the regular cast of the show at the start of the fourth season on 5 February 2012. In November 2012 AudioGO Ltd released an audiobook version of Mark Michalowski's Being Human tie-in novel Chasers, which is narrated by Tovey.

In a 2008 interview in Attitude, Tovey expressed his desire to play darker roles: "really dark, fucked-up characters... like drag queens, rent boys, someone who has been abused, a rapist", though noting that he does not consider himself "fucked-up".

In March 2009, the actor played a leading role in A Miracle at the Royal Court Theatre as Gary Trudgill, a British soldier returning to Norfolk from abroad. On 8 March 2009 he presented the Award for Best Actress to Margaret Tyzack for her performance in The Chalk Garden at the Laurence Olivier Awards in Grosvenor House.

In 2009, Tovey worked on the film Huge and starred in two television pilots: Young, Unemployed and Lazy (a BBC Three sitcom), renamed to Him & Her in 2010, and The Increasingly Poor Decisions of Todd Margaret (part of Comedy Showcase), a Channel 4 comedy with Spike Jonze and Will Arnett, written by David Cross and Shaun Pye.

He also appeared in shorts:

- Drop, which premièred at the 2009 Rushes Soho Shorts Film Festival)
- Roar, which premiered at the Palm Springs Film Festival on 24 June 2009.

In 2011, he became the voice over/narrator for the BBC Three show Sun, Sex and Suspicious Parents and its spinoffs, which ran for five series up to July 2015. Tovey narrated every episode aired.

Tovey played Budgie, one of Gavin's friends, in the BBC comedy-drama Gavin & Stacey. In January 2012, he appeared in the British crime drama Sherlock, playing Henry Knight in the episode "The Hounds of Baskerville". He had a lead role in the ITV sitcom The Job Lot which aired in 2013 and is set in a busy unemployment bureau in the West Midlands.

In 2013, Tovey signed on to appear in the American television series Looking, about a group of gay friends living in San Francisco area. Its 8-episode first season broadcast on HBO in 2014. Tovey was promoted to series regular for the second season.

In 2015, Tovey starred in Banished, a historical drama series written by Jimmy McGovern about a group of British convicts in Australia in the 18th century.

Also in 2015, Tovey made his first of many live appearances for arts and entertainment company Pin Drop Studio, reading a short story to an audience followed by an interview by Simon Oldfield.

In 2016, Tovey was cast in the ABC network thriller drama Quantico for the series regular role of Harry Doyle.

In April 2017, Tovey returned to the Royal National Theatre to appear in Marianne Elliot's revival of the Tony Kushner play Angels in America, opposite Andrew Garfield and Nathan Lane.

In September 2017, it was revealed that Tovey would be voicing Ray Terrill / The Ray, a reporter who gains light-based powers after being exposed to a genetic light bomb, in the animated web series Freedom Fighters: The Ray on CW Seed. Tovey appeared in "Crisis on Earth-X", the Arrowverse crossover event between Supergirl, Arrow, The Flash and Legends of Tomorrow.

In 2019, Tovey co-starred in an ensemble cast on the show Years and Years, and appeared with Helen Mirren and Ian McKellen in the drama film The Good Liar.

Tovey was awarded the Culture Award at the ninth annual Virgin Atlantic Attitude Awards.

It was announced in 2021 that Tovey had been cast in Allelujah, a film adaptation of Alan Bennett's play of the same name.

The following year, in 2022, Tovey started a role as Patrick Read in American Horror Story: NYC.

In 2024, Tovey starred as John O'Shea, Truman Capote's on-again-off-again lover, in FX's anthology series Feud: Capote vs. The Swans.

In July 2024, it was announced that Tovey would return to the Doctor Who universe as a new character in the spin-off series The War Between the Land and the Sea.

=== Other work ===
Tovey is also an author, playwright and screenwriter. He has written three plays (all unperformed as of August 2010), and one of his short stories was published in women's magazine Company. He also wrote a short film, Victor, and as of August 2010 was seeking funding to produce the picture.

In 2021, he published, with his friend Robert Diament, the book Talk Art.

Tovey presents the podcast Talk Art alongside Robert Diament. The podcast is about the contemporary art world featuring interviews with artists such as Marina Abramović, Roberta Smith, and Ai Weiwei.

Russel Tovey appeared as a guest judge on Season 3, Episode 8 of the hit TV show, RuPaul's Drag Race UK.

== Art collecting ==
Tovey collects contemporary art, which he got into at the age of 21 when his parents bought him a Tracey Emin print that he admired, called Dog Brains. Aside from several works by Emin, his collection now also includes works by Wolfgang Tillmans, Jamian Juliano Villani, Shannon Ebner, Rebecca Warren, Joyce Pensato, Amoako Boafo, Walter Price, Louis Fratino, Doron Langberg, Carmen Herrera, Rose Wylie, Toyin Ojih Odutola, Lisa Brice and Matias Faldbakken among others. Although he has been buying art since he was in his 20s, he considers himself to have been "properly collecting" since about 2010, with his collection now consisting of over 300 works of art. Tovey is passionate about supporting emerging and mid-career artists with his collecting.

Since 2018, Tovey has hosted a podcast called Talk Art with his friend, the gallerist Robert Diament of Carl Freedman gallery, in which the pair talk to their favourite artists, curators and art enthusiasts. In the over 120 episodes, guests have included Ryan Gander, Judy Chicago, Roberta Smith, Ai Weiwei, Marina Abramović, Rose Wylie, Anthony Cudahy and Ian Lewandowski, Zawe Ashton, Jenna Gribbon, Math Bass, Oscar yi Hou, Doron Langberg, Sharon Stone, Gus Van Sant, Nash Glynn, Hans Ulrich Obrist, and many more.

In 2019, Tovey guest curated Margate Now, an arts festival based in Margate. He has since curated a number of exhibitions for various galleries, as well as a contemporary art auction for Sotheby's.

Tovey was part of the jury of the 2021 Turner Prize.

Tovey was appointed the 2022 patron for the Art UK charity.

== Personal life ==
Tovey is gay. During his adolescent years, his family had difficulty accepting his sexual orientation. Although he says he realised he was gay when he was 15 or 16, he came out to his parents when he was 18. Tovey and his father subsequently had a serious disagreement, with his father suggesting that, had he known earlier, he would have asked Tovey to take hormones or undergo some other medical treatment to "fix the problem". Tovey says his parents were deeply concerned about the possibility he might contract HIV, which might have contributed to the disagreement. The birth of Tovey's nephew Nathan in October 2004 helped them mend their relationship.

From 2016, Tovey was in a relationship with rugby player and coach Steve Brockman. In March 2018, Tovey revealed the pair were engaged to be married, however, by June 2018, he confirmed they had split up. They reunited, but by 2023, it appeared they had broken up again.

In 2015, Tovey faced a social media backlash for comments regarding effeminate gay men made in an interview with The Observer, for which he subsequently apologised clarifying that the remarks did not reflect his actual views.

== Filmography ==
=== Film ===
Year	Title	Role	Notes
2001	The Emperor's New Clothes	Recruit	
2006	The History Boys	Peter Rudge	
2009	In Passing	Henry Travers	Short film
2010	Huge	Carl	
2012	Grabbers	Adam Smith	
2012	The Pirates! In an Adventure with Scientists!	The Albino Pirate	Voice (UK version)
2012	Tower Block	Paul	
2014	Effie Gray	George	
2014	Muppets Most Wanted	Delivery Man	
2014	Blackwood	Jack	
2014	Pride	Tim	
2014	Moomins on the Riviera	Moomintroll	Voice
2015	Stick Man	Dog	Voice
2015	The Lady in the Van	Young Man with Earring	
2016	The Pass	Jason	
2016	Mindhorn	Paul Melly	
2017	The Hippopotamus	Rupert Keynes	
2018	Hymn of Hate	Sergeant George May	Short film
2019	The Good Liar	Steven	
2022	Allelujah	Colin Colman	
2023	Night of the Lotus	Charlie	
2023	Love Again	Billy Brooks	
2025	Plainclothes	Andrew Walters	
2026	Queer Edward II	—N/a	Executive producer

=== Television ===
Year	Title	Role	Notes
1994	Mud	Bill Bailey	All episodes
1996	Look and Read:Spywatch	Dennis Sealey	All episodes
1998	The Mrs Bradley Mysteries	Stable Boy	Episode: "Speedy Death"
2000	Hope and Glory	Gary Bailey	Episode 2.2
2001	Agatha Christie's Poirot	Lionel Marshall	Episode: "Evil Under the Sun"
2001	The Bill	Tyro Shaw	2 episodes
2001	Holby City	Jerome Hibbert	Episode: "Borrowed Time"
2002	Ultimate Force	Weasel	Episode: "The Killing House"
2002	Silent Witness	Josh Palmer	Episode: "Kith and Kill" (2 parts)
2002	The Bill	Kieran Elcott	Episode: "068"
2003	William and Mary	Aaron Patterson	Episode 4
2003	Servants	John Walters	Episode 4
2005	Holby City	Adam Spengler	Episode: "Soft Centred"
2005	Messiah IV: The Harrowing	Robbie McManus	3 episodes
2005	My Family and Other Animals	Leslie Durrell	Television film
2007–2009, 2024	Gavin & Stacey	Budgie	5 episodes
2007	Rob Brydon's Annually Retentive	Ben	5 episodes
2007, 2010	Doctor Who	Midshipman Alonso Frame	2 episodes: "Voyage of the Damned" and "The End of Time: Part Two"
2008–2012	Being Human	George Sands	24 episodes
2008	Ashes to Ashes	Marcus Johnstone	Episode: "Episode 5"
2008	Mutual Friends	Estate Agent	Episode 5
2008	Little Dorrit	John Chivery	10 episodes
2009	Agatha Christie's Marple	PC Terence Reed	Episode: "Murder is Easy"
2009	The Increasingly Poor Decisions of Todd Margaret	Dave	Pilot Only
2010–2013	Him & Her	Steve Marshall	25 episodes
2010–2011	Doctor Who Confidential	Narrator	14 episodes
2011–2015	Sun, Sex and Suspicious Parents	Narrator	
2012	Sherlock	Henry Knight	Episode: "The Hounds of Baskerville"
2013	Talking to the Dead	DS Huw Brydon	2 episodes
2013	The Dog Rescuers	Narrator	10 episodes
2013	What Remains	Michael Jenson	4 episodes
2013–2015	The Job Lot	Karl Lyndhurst	18 episodes
2014–2015	Looking	Kevin Matheson	15 episodes
2015	Drunk History	King Charles II	Episode 6
2015	Banished	James Freeman	7 episodes
2016	Looking: The Movie	Kevin Matheson	Television film
2016	The Comic Strip Presents... Red Top	Andy Coulson	Television film
2016	The Night Manager	Simon Ogilvey	Episode 1
2016–2018	Quantico	Harry Doyle	Series regular
2018	Shane the Chef	Shane	All episodes
2017	Queers: More Anger	Phil	BBC4 TV monologue
2017	The Flash	Ray Terrill / The Ray	Episode: "Crisis on Earth-X, Part 3"
2017	Legends of Tomorrow	Ray Terrill / The Ray	Episode: "Crisis on Earth-X, Part 4"
2019	The Great Celebrity Bake Off for SU2C	Himself	Channel 4's Great British Bake Off Special for Stand Up To Cancer – Series 2, Episode 2
2019	Years and Years	Daniel Lyons	Main role (4 episodes)
2019	Supergirl	Ray Terrill / The Ray	Uncredited; Episode: "Crisis on Infinite Earths, Part 1"
2020	Flesh and Blood	Jake	4 episodes
2020	The Sister	Nathan	4 episodes
2021	RuPaul's Drag Race UK	Himself	Guest judge
2022	Starstruck	Dave	Guest role
2022	American Horror Story: NYC	Detective Patrick Read	Main role (10 episodes)
2023	The Fortress	Charlie Oldman	Main role (7 episodes)
2023–present	Juice	Guy	12 episodes
2024	Feud: Capote vs. The Swans	John O'Shea	3 episodes
2025	Suspect: The Shooting of Jean Charles de Menezes	Brian Paddick	4 episodes
2025	The War Between the Land and the Sea	Barclay Pierre-Dupont	Lead role; 5 episodes

=== Web ===
Year	Title	Role	Notes
2017–2018	Freedom Fighters: The Ray	Ray Terrill / The Ray	Animated series
2021	The Picture of Dorian Gray	Basil Hallward	Online production

== Other credits ==
=== Theatre ===
Year	Title	Role	Theatre	Location
2000	The Recruiting Officer		Chichester Festival Theatre	Chichester
2001	Howard Katz		Cottesloe Theatre, Royal National Theatre	London
2002	Plasticine	Spira / Boy Having Sex	Royal Court Theatre	London
2003	Henry V	Boy	Olivier Theatre, Royal National Theatre	London
2003	His Girl Friday	Ralph Sweeney	Olivier Theatre, Royal National Theatre	London
2003–2004	His Dark Materials	Roger Parslow	Olivier Theatre, Royal National Theatre	London
2004–2006	The History Boys	Peter Rudge	Lyttleton Theatre, Royal National Theatre	London
2005	The Laramie Project	Gil Engen	Sound Theatre	London
2005–2006	Hergé's Adventures of Tintin	Tintin	Barbican Arts Centre	London
2006	The History Boys	Peter Rudge	Lyric Theatre, Hong Kong Academy for Performing Arts	Hong Kong
2006	The History Boys	Peter Rudge	St James	Wellington
2006	The History Boys	Peter Rudge	Sydney Theatre	Sydney
2006	The History Boys	Peter Rudge	Broadhurst Theatre, Broadway	New York
2007	A Respectable Wedding	The Bridegroom	Young Vic	London
2008	The Sea	Billy Hallercut	Theatre Royal Haymarket	London
2009	A Miracle	Gary Trudgill	Royal Court Theatre	London
2012	Sex With a Stranger	Adam	Trafalgar Studios	London
2014	The Pass	Jason	Royal Court Theatre	London
2015	A View from the Bridge	Rodolpho	Lyceum Theatre	New York
2017	Angels in America	Joe Pitt	Lyttelton Theatre, Royal National Theatre	London
2018	The Lover / The Collection	The Milkman / Bill	Harold Pinter Theatre	London
2020	Who's Afraid of Virginia Woolf?	Nick	Booth Theatre, Broadway	New York
2021	Constellations	Roland	Vaudeville Theatre	London

=== Radio and readings ===
Year	Title	Role
2006	The History Boys	Peter Rudge
2007	Rubbish	Dan
2009	The Government Inspector	Gendarme
2009	The Admirable Crichton	Crichton
2009	Newfangle	Newfangle
2009	Last Night, Another Soldier	Briggsy
2009	The Richest Man in Britain	Dom
2011	Countrysides	Simon

Tovey has read several books for audio, notably a 2017 performance of The Picture of Dorian Gray. He is the narrator for the 20th anniversary edition audiobook of Nick Hornby's High Fidelity, released in 2015. Also, since 2016, he is the reader for audiobooks of Liz Pichon's Tom Gates book series, starting from book 10, Super Good Skills (Almost...), taking over from Rupert Grint.

== Awards and nominations ==
Awards and nominations received by Russell Tovey
Year	Organization	Award	Nominated work	Result	Ref.
2010	SFX Awards	Best Actor	Being Human	Nominated	
2011	SFX Awards	Cult Hero	Being Human	Won	
2012	SFX Awards	Best Actor	Being Human	Nominated	
2012	Royal Television Society Awards	Comedy Performance	Him & Her	Won	
2013	Behind the Voice Actors Awards	Best Vocal Ensemble in a Feature Film	The Pirates! Band of Misfits	Nominated	
2017	Diversity In Media Awards	Best Actor	Queers	Won	
2020	Critics Choice Awards	Best Supporting Actor in a Movie/Miniseries	Years and Years	Nominated	
2020	Attitude Awards	Culture Award	Himself	Won	
2025	Attitude Awards	Man of the Year	Himself	Won	
2025	Sundance Film Festival	U.S. Dramatic Ensemble Special Jury Award	Plainclothes	Won	
2025	FilmOut San Diego Awards	Best Supporting Actor	Plainclothes	Won	
2026	Iris Prize	Best Performance in a Male Role in a Feature Film	Plainclothes	Won	
2026	Queerties Awards	Film Performance	Plainclothes	Runner-up	
