= Herrick (surname) =

Herrick is a surname. Notable people and characters with the surname include:

== People ==
- Anson Herrick (1812–1868), Representative from New York
- Charles Herrick (1814–1886), American farmer, banker, and politician
- Charles Judson Herrick (1868–1960), American neurologist and member of the National Academy of Sciences
- Christine Terhune Herrick (1859–1944), American writer and journalist; mother to Horace
- Christopher Herrick (born 1942), English organist
- D-Cady Herrick (1846–1926), New York judge and politician
- Dennis Herrick (born 1952), Puerto Rican American wrestler and Olympics competitor
- Edward Claudius Herrick (1811–1862), American librarian
- Elinore Morehouse Herrick (1895–1964), American labor-relations specialist
- F. Herrick Herrick (1902–1987), American film director and philatelist
- Francis Hobart Herrick (1858–1940), American writer, ornithologist and Professor of Biology
- Genevieve Forbes Herrick (1894–1962), American journalist for the Chicago Tribune
- George Herrick (c.1658–1695) "Marshal" for the Court of Oyer and Terminer during Salem, Massachusetts' witchcraft trials of 1692
- Glenn Washington Herrick (1870–1965), American entomologist
- Henry Herrick, burgess for Warwick County, Virginia in 1644–1645, said to be a nephew of Thomas Herrick
- Horace Terhune Herrick (1887–1948), American scientist and national laboratory branch director; son of Christine
- Horatio G. Herrick (1824–1904), American lawyer and sheriff; nephew to Joshua
- Jack Herrick, founder of wikiHow
- James Herrick (disambiguation), any of several people
- Jason Herrick (born 1987), American soccer player
- Jim Herrick (1944–2023), British philosopher
- John Herrick (disambiguation), multiple people
- Joseph Herrick (1645–c.1717), principal law enforcement officer in Salem, Massachusetts during the witchcraft trials of 1692
- Joshua Herrick (1793–1874), American politician; uncle to Horatio
- Lott R. Herrick (1871–1937), American jurist
- Manuel Herrick or "Okie Jesus Congressman" (1876–1952), United States Representative from Oklahoma
- Margaret Herrick (1902–1976), American librarian and past director of the Academy of Motion Picture Arts and Sciences
- Merton W. Herrick (1834–1907), American politician
- Michael Herrick (1921–1944), New Zealand flying ace of the Second World War
- Myron T. Herrick (1854–1929), Governor of Ohio
- Rensselaer R. Herrick (1826–1899), American politician
- Richard Herrick (1931–1963), American, the first recipient of a living kidney transplant, from a donation by twin brother, Ronald
- Robert Herrick (disambiguation), any of several people
- Ronald Herrick, the first donor of a living kidney transplant, who donated it to his twin brother, Richard
- Ruth Herrick (1889–1983), director of the Women's Royal New Zealand Naval Service
- Samuel Herrick (disambiguation), multiple people
- Sophia Bledsoe Herrick (1837–1919), American writer and editor
- Steven Herrick (born 1958), Australian poet and author
- Thomas Herrick, Heyrick or Heyricke, member of the Virginia House of Burgesses in 1629–1630
- Una B. Herrick (1863–1950), American educator and college dean
- Walter R. Herrick (1877–1953), New York politician
- William Herrick (disambiguation), multiple people

== Fictional characters ==
- William Herrick, character in BBC3's Being Human

== See also ==
- Harrick, surname
