= Being Human (British TV series) series 5 =

Fifth series of 2008 British supernatural drama programme

Being Human
- Series 5
- No. of episodes: 6

Release
- Original network: BBC Three
- Original release: 3 February – 10 March 2013

Series chronology
- ← Previous; Series 4

Being Human is a British supernatural drama programme created and written by Toby Whithouse for Touchpaper Television. The fifth and final series began airing on BBC Three on 3 February 2013 and continued until mid-March 2013. The series follows the lives of a new ghost, vampire and werewolf trio living together and attempting to lead a normal life, and blends a mixture of flatshare comedy and horror drama.

== Main cast ==
- Michael Socha as Tom McNair
- Damien Molony as Hal Yorke
- Kate Bracken as Alex Millar
- Steven Robertson as Dominic Rook

== Recurring cast / guest stars ==
- Phil Davis as Captain Hatch / The Devil
- Colin Hoult as Crumb
- Julian Barratt as Larry
- Victoria Ross as Lady Catherine
- Benjamin Greaves-Neal as Oliver
- Madeleine Harris as Hettie
- Claire Cage as Patsy
- Non Haf as Sophie
- Toby Whithouse as Home Secretary Alistair Frith
- Kathryn Prescott as Natasha Miles

== Episodes ==
No. overall	No. in season	Title	Directed by	Written by	Original release date	UK viewers (millions)
32	1	"The Trinity"	Philip John	Toby Whithouse	3 February 2013	731,000
Ghost Alex is adjusting to life after death with werewolf Tom but vampire Hal is in hell. Not because he's chained up like an animal, but because he's desperate to get his marigolds on the messy house. But when Tom and Alex decide to set him free, Hal's wracked by uncertainty…can he control his bloodlust? Things get complicated with the return of Mr Rook, the shady figure whose government department protects the world from supernaturals. Having been fired from the café, Hal and Tom find new employment at the Barry Grand Hotel, home to poisonous pensioner Captain Hatch. Unknown to our trio, his decrepit exterior hides an ancient evil that threatens not only their friendship but also the entire world.
33	2	"Sticks and Ropes"	Philip John	Daragh Carville	10 February 2013	1,032,000
Alex discovers she's not the only ghost haunting Honolulu Heights as she discovers Oliver, a witty, sophisticated but largely racist and offensive ghost child hiding a terrible secret. Meanwhile, Tom and Hal go head-to-head in the hotel's Employee of the Month competition, much to the delight of Captain Hatch, who feeds on werewolf/vampire conflict. In the supernatural archive, Mr. Rook is hatching a devious scheme to save his department, one that involves newly made vampire Crumb. And everything is put to the test, when an unexpected visit from the legendary "Men with Sticks and Rope" show up at Honolulu Heights to trap Alex. But Oliver also plays a part in the scheme and will he pull through and save Alex?
34	3	"Pie and Prejudice"	Philip John	Jamie Mathieson	17 February 2013	979,000
When Tom meets minor TV personality Larry Chrysler, he's inspired by Larry's lifestyle and goes about learning how to be successful from his new mentor - but is Larry everything that he claims to be? Meanwhile, Hal is dressed to impress and secretly off to meet an old friend called Lady Mary. Alex's curiosity gets the better of her and she sneaks off to follow Hal, but soon discovers some worrying similarities between herself and Lady Mary.
35	4	"The Greater Good"	Daniel O'Hara	John Jackson	24 February 2013	988,000
Crumb has found his bloody way in the world with a new pal in tow. When Rook approaches Hal to get them under control, Hal is unable to refuse: he owes Rook a favour after all. But that's not the only favour Rook asks: he wants them to look after Bobby, a werewolf who has been under Rook's care for a very long time. The task falls to Tom and he has his work cut out for him reintroducing Bobby to a world he's long forgotten.
36	5	"No Care, All Responsibility"	Daniel O'Hara	Sarah Dollard	3 March 2013	1,075,000
Tom falls for a damsel in distress called Natasha, when she runs into the hotel looking for a safe haven. But Natasha comes to the attention of Hal for a darker reason, when she offers him a way to control his bloodlust and prevent him from killing innocents. Meanwhile, Alex is positive there's something suspect about hotel resident Captain Hatch. But the more she investigates, the deeper into danger she gets.
37	6	"The Last Broadcast"	Daniel O'Hara	Toby Whithouse	10 March 2013	1,086,000
Hal is ready to return to his hedonistic vampire ways, now he has built an army and has feasted on blood. Whilst Tom is set on killing him as an act of revenge. The trio have to battle the devil and Captain Hatch, who has Alex trapped and who also has managed to regain her strength. Hal, Tom and Alex do battle with the Devil in order to save the world. After defeating the devil all three are granted humanity as their curses were all a result of the Devil's Power. Alex, Tom and Hal sit down to watch television whilst talking about how Alex will approach her family and the trio's futures together.
