= Hayrick =

A hayrick is a large, sometimes thatched, outdoor pile of hay.

"Hayrick" may also refer to:

- Hayrick Butte, a subglacial volcano in Linn County, Oregon
- Hayrick Island, a small rock mass in the Terra Firma Islands, off the west coast of Graham Land, Antarctica
- Henry Hayrick, burgess for Warwick County, Virginia (1644–1645)
- Thomas Hayrick, member of the Virginia House of BurgessesAssembly, Elizabeth City County, Virginia (1629–1630)

== See also ==
- Herrick (disambiguation)
