= List of Being Human characters =

List of Being Human characters may refer to:

- List of Being Human (British TV series) characters
- List of Being Human (North American TV series) characters
