= Frederick Bowley =

Frederick Bowley may refer to:

- Frederick Bowley (politician) (1851–1916), American politician
- Frederick Bowley (cricketer, born 1873) (1873–1943), British cricketer for Worcestershire
- Frederick Bowley (cricketer, born 1909) (1909–1994), British cricketer for Leicestershire
