= Herrick =

Herrick may refer to:

== Places ==
Australia

- Herrick, Tasmania, a locality

United States

- Herrick, Illinois
- Herrick, Ohio
- Herrick, South Dakota
- Herrick Township, Knox County, Nebraska
- Herrick Township, Bradford County, Pennsylvania
- Herrick Township, Susquehanna County, Pennsylvania
- Herricks, New York

== People ==
- Herrick (surname)
- Herrick Bowley (1911–1991), English cricketer
- C. Herrick Hammond (1882–1969), American architect
- Herrick Johnson (1832–1913), American Presbyterian clergyman
- William Herrick Macaulay (1853–1936), British mathematician
- Helen Herrick Malsed (1910–1998), American toy inventor

== Other uses ==
- Herrick Corporation, American steel corporation
- Operation Herrick, the codename for British military operations in Afghanistan
- Herrick, a fictional character in the Fusion comic book series

== See also ==
- Herric, the pseudonym of French illustrator Chéri Hérouard
