= Joseph Herrick =

American law enforcement officer

Coat of Arms of Joseph Herrick

Joseph Herrick (August 6, 1645 – ca. 1717) was the principal law enforcement officer in Salem, Massachusetts during the Salem Witchcraft Trials of 1692. Joseph, it was believed, was the son of Henry Herrick, who was the fifth son of Sir William Herrick (Heyricke or Eyrick) of Beaumanor Park, in the parish of Loughborough, in the county of Leicester, England. Recent research indicates that Joseph is the son of a different Henrie Hericke, who also immigrated to America, possibly a cousin of the Henry Heyricke of Beaumanor. Henry Heyricke of Beaumanor owned land Poquosin Creek, York Co., Virginia. He is noted in various records from 1640 to 1659. His location after 1659 has not been discovered. He served in the House of Burgesses in 1644–45.

Henry Hericke, progenitor of most of the Herricks in America, migrated to Salem in 1629 as a member of Higginson's fleet. Joseph, Henry's 4th son, was married to Sarah, the daughter of Richard Leach, on February 7, 1667. He was referred to as governor, which means he had probably been in command of a military district at some point, or perhaps he had been the magistrate of a West Indies colony. His descendants were large in number, and have held many important positions.

Joseph Herrick was a soldier during King Philip's War. In 1692, at age forty-seven, he was a corporal in the village militia. He was the constable of Salem, and, as such, central to the proceedings in the witchcraft trials. At the beginning he was persuaded by the accusers; but by the end he had become a skeptic. In one of the cases, he became an advocate for an accused person, which was probably quite dangerous; and in the end he was a leader in the opposition movement. His parents are mentioned in an earlier court record to have been fined "for aiding and comforting an excommunicated person, contrary to order."

== See also ==
- George Herrick
