= Frederick Bowley (cricketer, born 1909) =

English cricketer

Frederick James Bowley (20 February 1909 – October 1994) was an English first-class cricketer, who played for Leicestershire.

== Family Life ==
He was born at Ratby, Leicestershire in 1909 to Frederick James and Emma Bowley. His brother Herrick Bowley born in 1911, also played for Leicestershire in the 1930s.

== Cricket career ==
Bowley played 24 County Championship matches for Leicestershire, three in 1930, ten in 1931 and eleven in 1937. He batted right-handed and bowled slow left-arm orthodox.

His bowling was the better element of his play in an otherwise undistinguished career, taking 5 wickets @41.80 in 1930, 18 @31.16 in 1931, and 17 @54.05 in 1937.

Fred Bowley rarely reached double figures with the bat, his top score of 25 coming in a 1937 match against Sussex when he was bowled by Maurice Tate having completed a century partnership with Stuart Dempster.

== Later life and death ==
At the time World War Two broke out he was a threshing machine operator and lived with his parents in Blaby, Leicestershire

He died in October 1994 at Leicester.
