= List of Being Human (British TV series) characters =

This is a list of fictional characters in the British supernatural comedy drama television series Being Human. The story follows a vampire, a werewolf, and a ghost as they try to live together in modern-day Britain. Actors Lenora Crichlow, Russell Tovey and Aidan Turner composed the original cast of the program's first three seasons with Sinead Keenan joining the main cast in the third season. The original cast changed minimally in season 4 however the fifth season featured an entirely new werewolf, vampire, and ghost trio played by Michael Socha, Damien Molony, and Kate Bracken.

== Main characters ==
Character	Actor	Description
Anna Clare Sawyer	Lenora Crichlow	Anna Clare Sawyer, known commonly as "Annie", is a ghost, appearing as she did at the time of her death in her early twenties. Up until her death, she had been living with her fiancé Owen (whom she later revealed had been her third serious relationship, her previous two having ended when her first boyfriend posted naked pictures of her on the Internet and when her second boyfriend drunkenly invited her mother to form a threesome). Following her death, she haunted the house in which she and Owen had lived while she was alive, and which Owen was now running as landlord (eventually renting it out to George and Mitchell). Annie's ability to be seen and heard by normal people depends on her state of mind, although supernatural creatures can always see her. Annie eventually falls in love with Mitchell and is devastated when he volunteers to be staked by George. When George and Nina are both killed in a war against the vampires, Annie takes responsibility for their daughter Eve, along with new housemates Tom McNair and Hal. In the Series 4 finale she sacrifices herself and baby Eve to destroy the Old Ones with a bomb Tom made. With her unfinished business taken care of, her Door to the other side appears once more, and she passes through it to reunite with her friends.
George Sands, Junior	Russell Tovey	George Sands, Junior is a young werewolf in his mid-twenties, and Mitchell's best friend. He also shares a close, sibling-like friendship with Annie. Less socially adept than Mitchell, he is considerably more intellectual, possessing an IQ of 156 and being able to speak French, German, Italian, Spanish and Croatian. George grew up in an average suburban household with what he considered to be a very straightforward family, including a father who possessed none of the handicaps or problems such as alcoholism or gambling which George saw in other peoples' fathers. (He would reflect later on that at the time he had never realised how important "boring" could be.) George is Jewish and wears a Star of David pendant. George became a werewolf while on holiday in Scotland. He was about to go out for a walk when an American tourist, not knowing his way around, invited himself along after George reluctantly let him. They both got lost as night fell and were attacked by a werewolf–later revealed to be a man named Lee Tully, who later comes looking for him in search of companionship–who killed the tourist and scratched George, who survived when the rescue services found him. After becoming a werewolf, George left his family, his job and his fiancée, afraid of hurting them. He works alongside Mitchell as a porter in the local hospital, unable to hold down a more permanent job due to his monthly transformations, which are extremely painful.
John Mitchell	Aidan Turner	John Mitchell is a 117-year-old vampire (born on 29 July 1893) with the appearance of a young man in his twenties. He had chosen to give up drinking blood and preying on humans, attempting instead (insofar as it is possible) to become human, again. Born in 1893 and Irish by birth, Mitchell fought as a young soldier in World War I, when he was originally recruited as a vampire by William Herrick. In his early years as a vampire (and before his conscience was reawakened), Mitchell was quite a hero within the vampire community, who still circulate stories of his exploits amongst themselves. These seem to be a cause of great guilt for Mitchell who has asked Herrick to stop the retelling of the stories as he would prefer to be forgotten. At several points, he has faced a conflict of emotions as he debated whether to "convert" people dying around him to prevent their deaths. In the 1960s, Herrick gave Mitchell the opportunity to kill a young girl that they had lured into their car. Mitchell showed guilt and anger at the easiness of the kill and let her go. He told Herrick that she had escaped, prompting the suspicious Herrick to say that he would keep a closer eye on Mitchell. Mitchell has attempted several times to abstain from drinking blood (one attempt was a New Year resolution for 2000, with the aid of a fellow vampire called Carl). At this time, Mitchell showed an extreme addiction to blood, as well as heightened aggression, lack of control and extreme panic due to blood withdrawal. Mitchell's reluctant rescue of the werewolf George from a squad of fellow vampires, and the subsequent development of their friendship, further awakens his conscience, and he eventually opts to drift away from the vampire group in Bristol and to join George in living quietly.
Nina Pickering	Sinead Keenan	Nina Pickering is a senior staff nurse at the hospital in which Mitchell and George work, with a fiery and strong manner that can be intimidating. She initially views George as a bumbling, arrogant fool, but falls for him later after seeing his more caring side with the patients.
Thomas McNair	Michael Socha	Thomas McNair is a young 21-year-old werewolf. He first appears in Series Three, in which he is living a nomadic life in a camper van with his adopted father McNair. Their lifestyles as itinerant vampire killers had left Thomas socially isolated and dreaming of making a family with "the pack" of werewolves which McNair had claimed exist somewhere.
Henry "Hal" (or "Harry") Yorke	Damien Molony	Henry "Hal" (or "Harry") Yorke is an English vampire first encountered at the start of Series Four. He was born in the late 15th century to one of six prostitutes working in a brothel. He has claimed that he didn't know which of the prostitutes was his mother, but loved them all nevertheless. He was turned at the Battle of Orsha on 8 September 1514 by an army surgeon after being fatally wounded by an enemy soldier's lance. He has since become a well-known and feared vampire in the intervening years, being a commander in the vampire/werewolf wars of the early 1910s; he participated in a ritual intended to bind and seal the Devil, but because he didn't use his own blood for the ritual, the Devil was merely trapped in a human form, retaining enough of his power to destroy the ghost and werewolves in the ritual. He is named as "Lord Harry" in the episode 3 of series 4, having once been a high-ranking "Old One" (He apparently knew previous characters Daisy and Ivan before their deaths in series 2, although it is unclear if he knew other vampires encountered in the series). Hal's character notes on the BBC 3 Being Human page state that "coming to Honolulu Heights is a huge disruption for Hal. And he doesn’t cope well with disruption. At first, Hal – the stand-offish, posh vampire – and Tom – the common, feral werewolf – find themselves at loggerheads, but once a mutual respect is gained, we see this odd couple become close."
Alex Millar	Kate Bracken	Alex Millar is a young woman who first appears in the series 4 episode Puppy Love. She is a determined tomboy, the only woman in a family otherwise consisting of her father and three younger brothers, since her mother walked out on the family when she was seventeen. She wanted to be a concert pianist in life, and was generally a 'tomboy', rarely dressing in a feminine manner. On holiday in Barry with her family (only one of whom has appeared onscreen so far), Alex encounters Hal at the cafe and becomes romantically involved with him. She initially (and unintentionally) bewilders and intimidates Hal, who cannot understand her attitude and initially shakes her off when she attempts to flirt with him: but Alex remains sufficiently interested to return to the cafe and leave her number for him. Alex is captured and subsequently killed, fatally drained of blood as part of the vampire Cutler's plot to both seduce and punish Hal. Although Alex dies, she returns as a ghost. While Kate Bracken's return as Alex in series five was not stated by the BBC in press releases concerning Series 5, she stated in an interview that she would indeed be returning.
Dominic Rook	Steven Robertson	Dominic Rook is the leader of a British government department initially identified as "the Men in Grey" or as "the clean-up team". The official name of the department has been revealed as "Department of Domestic Defence" (DoDD), it has existed since the time of Oliver Cromwell and carries out an extensive cover-up of the existence of supernatural creatures. Rook has stated in dialogue that it is not run by supernatural creatures and that few such creatures even suspect its existence; and that it is perhaps best described as the "domestic staff" of the world, ensuring that the rest of the world's people "sleep soundly." Rook has also suggested (or threatened) that people like him are "magicians", able to make people "disappear in a puff of smoke." Rook is profoundly attached to his job, to the point at which he sees it as his entire life. He is ruthless in both carrying out his tasks and defending his profession. Rook and the Men in Grey play a more prominent role in Series 5, when they fall victim to government budget cuts which will close the department within three months. Distraught by the news, Rook is driven to increasingly desperate measures and moral compromise in order to save the Men in Grey and his own life's work.

== Supporting characters ==
=== Pilot ===
==== Recurring characters ====
Character	Actor	Description
The Men with Sticks and Rope		The Men with Sticks and Rope are demons who are waiting for the dead in the afterlife. They put those creatures into hell, who haven't behaved well in their life. Vampires and Ghost both have seen them after they have been dead for a short time. It's a traumatic experience for them and they do not like to speak about it. When Ghosts don't go through their doors into Purgatory, the Men with Sticks and Rope try to catch them. The Men with Sticks and Rope are first mentioned in the pilot by Annie and Mitchell who share their experience with the Men. In series two, they begin to communicate through electric waves. In series five the devil sends them, to catch the ghost Alex Millar.

==== Secondary characters ====
Character	Actor	Description
Julia Beckett	Claire Foy	Julia Beckett is the fiancée of George. George leaves her after he is infected with the werewolf curse without saying another word. Julia thinks that George is dead until she meets him again at the hospital. When Julia gets attacked by her abusive new fiancé Peter (Will Irvine), George protects her. George and Julia become closer again until Julia realises that George is a werewolf. She tells George that she is not able to face all this and leaves him.

=== Series 1 ===
==== Recurring characters ====
Character	Actor	Description
William Herrick	Jason Watkins	William Herrick is the powerful vampire "king", who "recruited" Mitchell during World War I. In the first series, he is the leader of the Bristol vampire community, but is also putting into place a Final Solution-style movement in which the human population of the world would either be turned into vampires or farmed for blood. To blend in with the human population, he works as a police sergeant, and his vampire coven operate under the auspices of a funeral parlour. His cold, calculating personality is a stark contrast to Mitchell's compassionate character, and he often finds Mitchell's struggle to control his bloodlust and to blend in with humanity both amusing and offensive. Before Herrick is able to fully execute his plans, however, George tricks him into agreeing to a showdown with Mitchell. In actuality, George manages to get Herrick alone with him in a small room during a full moon. George then transforms into his werewolf form (in which he was far physically stronger than a vampire) and kills Herrick by decapitating him. Herrick appeared in a flashback in Series Two during a visit he and Mitchell made to London in 1969, during which he revealed that there is a similar system in London to the one which exists in Bristol, but he doesn't get along with the head vampire in London – the vampire's identity was never named – because he killed the vampire's mother under unrevealed circumstances. In the Series Two finale, Herrick was resurrected by Daisy and Cara after they slit their wrists over his grave. It was possible for them to resurrect Herrick because his head wasn't cut off. He was just ripped apart and to kill a vampire properly their head needs to be cut off. Herrick returned in the fifth episode of Series Three, apparently traumatised by what he experienced while dead, as he is seen in a hospital in a straitjacket, showing terror when Mitchell attacks him and confused when he realises that he cannot see his reflection in a mirror. Despite his apparent personality changes, such as his attempt to console George over his fears about becoming a father, his expressed disdain for Annie's goodness, coupled with him directing Nina to a scrapbook of Mitchell's past murders, suggests that some part of him remains underneath his amnesia. Mitchell has agreed to spare Herrick on George's request, but is also determined to discover the secret of Herrick's resurrection so that he can use it to escape his apparently prophesied demise. Mitchell's attempts to restore Herrick's memory met with failure; although Mitchell speculated that human blood would restore Herrick's memory, he is naturally reluctant to go that far himself, while Herrick displayed an apparent discomfort at the idea of drinking from police detective Nancy Reed when she came to question Mitchell based on an anonymous tip about the Box Tunnel 20, although he was clearly tempted to do so despite his amnesia. Herrick was partially restored to himself after killing the werewolf McNair (who attempted to kill Herrick because McNair had become infected with lycanthropy when Herrick put him in a cage to fight a werewolf) and made a full return to awareness and memory when he drank Nancy after she led the police team to arrest Mitchell. He subsequently slaughtered the rest of the police team in the house, and then captured Nina on her return alone to the house. Despite expressing "a dilemma" over whether to kill Nina in order to pay George back for killing him, or to let her live due to her kindness to him, Herrick chose to stab her (commenting that if he didn't "people would think I've gone soft..."). He dies at the end of series 3 (The wolf-shaped bullet) by getting staked by Mitchell while he is distracted by a sunrise.
Lauren Drake	Annabel Scholey	Lauren Drake was a vampire turned by Mitchell in the pilot episode, who once worked as a nurse at the hospital. Abandoned by Mitchell after being turned, Herrick took her under his wing, and while she resented what Mitchell has done to her, she also revelled in the vampire culture. Mitchell attempted unsuccessfully to convince her to give up drinking blood, but she aided Mitchell and his friends in escaping the vampire headquarters. Once safe, she pleads with Mitchell to kill her with a stake through the heart, which Mitchell does reluctantly.
Seth	Dylan Brown	Seth was Herrick's primary henchman. He and Mitchell were rivals in the first series, as Seth was the one who was caught beating up George on the night that he and Mitchell met. Seth was seen as more impulsive and sarcastic than Herrick, although he did fall in line when the situation called for it. In episode 5 of the first series, he was killed by Lauren as Mitchell and his friends try to escape the vampire compound. He is however, mentioned in the Finale of series 3 by Herrick, while reminding Mitchell about not revealing the existence of vampires ("Even Seth knew that – and he used to point at planes.")
Cara	Rebecca Cooper	Cara first appeared in Series 1 as a hospital canteen worker. She was recruited as a vampire by Herrick after he saw the advantage of having a vampire ally working in the hospital. Despite her low intelligence and lack of discipline, she proved an enthusiastic recruit and played a role in furthering Herrick's plans in his (ultimately unsuccessful) attempts to win over or destroy Mitchell and to kill George. She remained loosely attached to the vampire coven in Series 2, although she seems to have spent much of her time homeless. Following Mitchell's accession to the "kingship" of the Bristol vampire community, she was the first of the vampires to break his edict against feeding. He punished her by smashing out her fangs and locking her into a cave, claiming to the others that he had executed her for disobedience. At the end of Series 2, she was released by Daisy in order to assist in the resurrection of Herrick – she and Daisy provided the blood required for the task. She briefly returned in Series 3 (without Daisy), having tracked Mitchell and George to Barry and brought the amnesiac, dysfunctional Herrick with her in an attempt to seek their help in "restoring" him to his former power and awareness. Utterly besotted by Herrick (and referring to herself as his 'dark bride'), she is heartbroken when Herrick both remains in his amnesiac state and cruelly rejects her. In despair and humiliation, she commits suicide by staking herself.
Owen Norayan	Gregg Chillin	Owen Norayan was the landlord of the property occupied by the three housemates, and Annie's ex-fiancé. He was also the man who killed Annie by pushing her down the stairs after an argument. After the murder, Owen immediately turned to his new girlfriend, Janey Harris, whom Owen had been having an affair with during his relationship with Annie. After an unsuccessful attempt to haunt Owen and Janey, during which he attempted to mock her for her 'pathetic' hanging around, Annie later confronted him with George and Mitchell, revealing their true nature and telling Owen a secret about what happens upon someone's death. This secret, which was unheard by the viewer, drove Owen mad with fear and compelled him to confess his crime to the police so that he can be kept safe from 'them'. Owen is currently incarcerated in an asylum, although his information allowed Kemp to identify Mitchell, George and Annie as their true natures.
Josie Hunter	Clare Higgins (old Josie); Charlene McKenna (young Josie)	Josie Hunter was a former girlfriend of Mitchell's during the 1960s, when she helped to shelter Mitchell when he tried to escape the police after he and Herrick killed several girls in a London flat. Though diagnosed with terminal lung cancer, she resisted Mitchell's attempts to recruit her for Herrick's movement and warned him of Herrick's plans, later sacrificing herself to give Mitchell her blood so that he could heal after an attack from Herrick.

==== Secondary characters ====
Character	Actor	Description
Lee Tully	Dean Lennox Kelly	Lee Tully is a werewolf who encountered George during Series One and offered to mentor him through his condition. He is much more comfortable with being a werewolf than George, and a combination of his "seize-the-day" outlook and clever advice on handling the condition won George's trust (and, to a degree, hero-worship). However, George pushed Tully away when he discovered that Tully was the werewolf originally responsible for George's own condition, and was only trying to befriend George to combat his own loneliness. Following his rejection by George, Tully left the area and he wasn't heard from until the season 2 finale when – in Kemp's facility – George and Nina notice some writing in a holding cell stating George, all the werewolves die signed Tully, indicating Tully encountered and died at the hands of Jaggat's 'cure'. His first name is revealed to be Lee, as Lucy names him as one of the four who died in the chamber.
Gilbert	Alex Price	Gilbert is a ghost who had an unresolved business to deal with. His unresolved business is to fall in love, which he does, when he meets Annie. Gilbert is an expert in criticizing music and a vegetarian.
Janey Harris	Sama Goldie	Janey Harris was Owen's girlfriend and fiancée after Annie was murdered. She owns a nearby tanning salon, and Annie often seethed at her "orange" appearance along with her shallow and somewhat dense personality. After discovering how she had died, Annie attempted to warn Janey of Owen's violent side, but was thwarted when Owen discovered the two of them and dismissed Annie's presence as a figment of Janey's guilty conscience (for their affair while Annie was still alive).
Bernie	Mykola Allen	Bernie was a schoolboy who lived in the neighbourhood. After Mitchell scared away a group of kids who were bullying Bernie, the two became friends, and Mitchell became something of a father figure to Bernie. Unfortunately, a turn of events involving a vampire porn/snuff film DVD caused both Mitchell and George to be accused of pædophilia by Bernie's mother, Fleur, and for the two of them to be ostracised and persecuted by the neighbourhood. This blew up into a riot during which Bernie was hit by a car and rendered comatose. With Fleur's consent and knowledge, Mitchell turned Bernie into a vampire to save his life, but was racked with guilt about condemning the boy to the life of a vampire. Both Bernie and Fleur have moved away and their whereabouts are unknown.
Becca	Jessica Harris	Becca works with Mitchell and George at the hospital. George likes Becca but she is mainly interested in Mitchell. When Becca and Mitchell go out on a date Becca is being attacked by the vampire Lauren. Since Becca is dying George asks Mitchell to turn her into a vampire. Mitchell refuses, because he has seen what has become of Lauren after he had turned her.

=== Series 2 ===
==== Recurring characters ====
Character	Actor	Description
Kemp	Donald Sumpter	Kemp is a member of the secretive organisation pursuing supernaturals in Series 2 (although technically he first appears in the closing moments of the last episode of Series 1). He is Lloyd's superior though not the organisation's leader. He is a religious zealot who appears to have his own agenda as regards supernaturals, whom he thinks should be removed from society. Following Professor Jaggat's instructions, Kemp allows Mitchell, George and Annie to be left alone simply to study the consequences of the three 'types' interacting with each other on a long-term basis. Although he claimed to want to help a werewolf develop a cure for his 'condition' by putting him in a hyperbaric chamber to cancel out the pressure caused by the moon, when the treatment began to prove dangerous to the werewolf Kemp allowed it to continue, and implies that he has seen similar 'accidents' in his time. In a flashback it was revealed that Kemp was an Anglican priest whose wife and young daughter were killed by a trio of vampires thirty years ago, which is what motivates his mission. Even to this day he still carries the blood soaked Bible he used to defend himself on the night he discovered what became of his family. He is clearly defined by his prejudices, believing that werewolves are possession by a demonic force rather than an 'infection'. He has also commented (on one occasion) that he believes Mitchell "seduced" George to explain their friendship, rather than believing that Mitchell could genuinely form a platonic friendship with another being. In Episode Eight, he went so far as to kill a psychic that had been working with the group in order to create a Door so that he could forcibly exorcise Annie, only for Mitchell to spare his life when George argued that killing him for Annie would be killing him for the wrong reasons. He subsequently tracked down Mitchell, George and Nina to try to kill them, even killing Lucy after she unintentionally led him to their new home, only for him to be forcibly dragged through the Door by Annie despite his still-living status.
Professor Lucy Jaggat	Lyndsey Marshal	Professor Lucy Jaggat is the chief scientist working for the mysterious organisation pursuing supernatural entities in Series 2. Professor Jaggat is first mentioned by Kemp in the final episode of the first series, and is constantly referred to by both Kemp and Lloyd in the first two episodes of the second series. At the end of episode 3 Professor Jaggat is revealed to be Lucy, a doctor who has recently moved to Bristol and who has been forging a close relationship with Mitchell since episode 1 of Series 2. Despite Kemp's own prejudices against the supernatural, Lucy appears to be more willing to treat them as humans, believing Mitchell's claims that he is trying to go clean from blood- although he initially didn't explicitly reveal his vampire status to her, simply saying that he is trying to get past something- and normalising the pressure in the hyperbaric chamber when Nina is inside to save her life. When Mitchell finally revealed his true identity to her, the two actually slept together. Lucy's subsequent guilt about the liaison drove her to contact Kemp and reveal the location of a vampire stronghold, allowing Kemp to kill over thirty vampires with a bomb. Her betrayal left Mitchell disgusted with humanity, and sent him on a bloody rampage. In the Series Two finale, Mitchell was about to kill her, when Kemp dragged Annie through the door, and she was sent to the afterlife. Presumably he felt a painful reaction at her leaving (due to the fact he'd gotten so attached to her) and crumpled to the floor in pain, crawling away from Lucy and towards Kemp. Lucy is last seen at the very end of the series, walking up to Mitchell in the street. She attempts to apologise, but Mitchell refuses, distraught at the loss of Annie- he blames her partly for what happened, calling her a monster. He does however let her stay. George wakes in the night to hear Lucy scream- and he finds she'd been killed by Kemp, who had presumably gone mad (or even madder than he had been to begin with). Annie comes back from the door to drag Kemp back in with her, stopping him from killing Mitchell, Nina and George.
Ivan	Paul Rhys	Ivan is a 237-year-old vampire who (together with his consort Daisy) travels the world as a war tourist. It is this pursuit that has brought him to Bristol to witness the aftermath of William Herrick's death. He made his debut on the show in the first episode of Series 2. Ivan is jaded by his long existence as a vampire, and has displayed a detached curiosity about human feelings, having lost his own almost entirely, he is also known to have a dark sense of humour. Although he agreed to serve as the 'poster-boy' for Mitchell's 'anti-blood' group, he has admitted that he cannot forsake his centuries of 'servitude' to the hunger, forcing Mitchell to allow him to feed in private in order to maintain his image for the group. In episode 6 of series 2, Ivan is apparently killed when the vampires' base is blown up, but he manages to save Mitchell's life by shielding him from the brunt of the explosion. He and Daisy apparently encountered former Old One Hal at one point, as Hal compared a new vampire couple to Ivan and Daisy.
Daisy Hannigan-Spiteri	Amy Manson	Daisy Hannigan-Spiteri is Ivan's consort, originally a young Scottish woman whom he met in an air raid shelter during World War II and persuaded to come with him on a life of adventure, leaving her baby daughter behind (Ivan presumably turned Daisy into a vampire shortly afterwards.) Daisy joined Ivan on his war tourism for the next 60-odd years. In a prequel to Series 2 placed by the BBC on YouTube entitled Ivan & Daisy, she persuaded Ivan to take her to Bristol and indulge their appetite for visiting hot-spots by witnessing the aftermath of William Herrick's death. An additional (and secret) motive for their trip to Bristol was so that she could visit and murder her ageing daughter (which Daisy referred to as "the last thread" keeping her attached to her former life). Daisy seduced George in episode 1 of Series 2 and their paths have continued to cross. George, in turn, persuaded her not to murder her daughter by re-awakening Daisy's human feelings and sense of guilt over her She returns in episode 7 of series 2, distraught over the death of Ivan. She accompanies Mitchell in trying to find out the instigator behind the explosion that killed Ivan and numerous other vampires. When Mitchell discovers that Lucy, his lover from previous episodes, was involved, the two vampires go on a feeding frenzy on a railway train, savaging an entire carriage (known as the Box Tunnel twenty massacre). The two are then seen in bed together, covered in blood. Mitchell apparently left her to rescue George, Nina and Annie. Daisy then opted to resurrect Herrick, rescuing fellow vampire Cara from incarceration in order to carry out the necessary blood rite. Although Cara remained with Herrick, McNair told Herrick that he had killed Daisy, showing one of her teeth as proof.
Lloyd Pinky (credited as simply Technician in the second series)	Mark Fleischmann	Lloyd Pinky is a technician working for the mysterious organisation that seeks to study and experiment on supernaturals. He also runs the Centre for the Study of Supernatural Activity (or CenSSA) website which forms part of a viral campaign for Series 2. It is not altogether clear whether CenSSA and the mysterious organisation he works for on the show are one and the same. On the website in a video posted on Monday 18 January 2010 he refers to his colleagues in the mysterious organisation as "the Bible boys downstairs".
Sam Danson	Lucy Gaskell	Sam Danson is a woman who met George following his initial break-up with Nina, while he was teaching at the language college where she worked as a secretary. Sam is a single parent, living with her daughter Molly in Sam's mother's flat. She and George became attracted to each other and began a whirlwind romance. Increasingly desperate and determined to lead a normal human life (and still on the rebound from Nina), George rapidly escalated the relationship to the point where he, Sam and Molly moved into a new house together. Soon afterwards, he proposed marriage but Sam preferred to defer it until later. George's attempts to conceal his werewolf nature from Sam, and to protect his new family from it, led him into lying to her. When he made a mistake over daylight saving time (failing to plan properly for his transformation at moonrise), he began to transform in front of her before fleeing. Although George managed to conceal the full truth of his condition from Sam (managing to persuade her that at least part of it was "anger management issues") he came to realise that his attempts to lead a normal life with her were doomed, and ended the relationship.
Molly Danson	Molly Jones	Molly Danson is Sam's young pre-teen daughter. Cynical, toughened and very intelligent (she is quite capable of researching information and laying traps for liars), she is suspicious of any of Sam's boyfriends and does her best to reject and intimidate them. Despite this, George eventually manages to persuade her to warm to him. The relationship becomes strained when Molly discovers that George has been lying to Sam, although she is sufficiently accepting of George to warn him against lying rather than turning Sam against him. Molly appears to have some degree of psychic sensitivity, as she dreams about George being "not George", although she doesn't realise the entire truth about him. It is at Molly's school that George's life with Molly and Sam is destroyed, when George begins to transform unexpectedly during a parent's evening. During his escape from the building, Molly sees him during the early stages of transformation (with changed eyes, teeth and claws) and is terrified. Although she does not explain her terror to her mother, she retains it on George's return to their house, leading him to realise that he can no longer conceal his werewolf nature and therefore cannot continue to be part of their family. Though heartbroken, George clearly bears no grudges against Molly for her part in the situation, referring to both Sam and Molly as "wonderful" before he leaves.
Saul	Alex Lanipekun	Saul is a real-estate agent who entered into the corner pub while Annie was practising her job as a bartender in episodes 1 and 2 of Series 2. Striking up a friendship, Saul doesn't initially confide to her a prior car accident which rendered him clinically dead for six minutes but left him sensitive to the presence and communication of evil spirits; after being pressured by them to explain the incident to her, he invites her to his flat where he is then goaded by a spirit utilising the form of a television news anchor to commit sexual assault, at which point Annie disappears. Distraught, Saul is then encouraged to drink and drive under the influence, leading to a car crash in which he is brutally injured. Annie, however, is present when Saul dies and appears out of body, just in time for the "door" to appear in the hospital room; Annie then realises that the spirits (now urging Saul through a nearby radio) are guiding him to drag Annie kicking and screaming to the afterlife, at which point she violently resists his attempted abduction until Saul finally seizes control of himself enough to drop her before the door separates them for eternity. Annie then realises that the spirits in the afterlife are desperate to use any means to bring her beyond the door, even those who are sensitive to spirits and who may genuinely love her.
Hugh	Nathan Wright	Hugh is the owner of the corner pub at which Annie temporarily worked in episodes 1 and 2. He finds Annie quirky as a bartender, but eventually develops a strong, but private interest in her (and a rivalry with Saul). He eventually shows up at the main characters' flat after Annie was sexually assaulted (under duress) by Saul, where he confesses his love for her, but then he decides that he did not want to fall in love with her so soon after Annie's "breakup", and they instead commit to taking time as friends (and when she decides to initiate a kiss). This love is short-lived by way of Annie being deprived of her visibility after Saul was goaded to attempt to drag her into the afterlife. Annie and George allow Hugh a certain amount of closure later on, by reuniting him with his former lover, who had been working as a florist since their regretful break-up some time previous.
Sykes	Bryan Dick	Sykes is an experienced ghost from World War Two who teaches ghosts' skills to Annie to allow her to thwart the Gatekeepers. Having been a ghost for 60 years, Sykes has developed his powers extensively, being able to read auras, read minds and show greater control over technology than Annie. Sykes is a ghost due to his reluctance to meet his ex-comrades in the afterlife, who he fears will punish him due to failing them and causing their deaths. Sykes was a Royal Air Force corporal when he died and still wears the uniform.

==== Secondary characters ====
Character	Actor	Description
Hennessey	Adrian Schiller	Hennessey is a psychic who works with Kemp's organization. He is first seen as a convict going along with Kemp to test any supernatural presence in the flat. He later acts as a medium between Annie and Kemp in the initial attempt to allow Annie to pass on which was interrupted by one of George's oncoming transformations. He resides in Kemp's facility following Annie moving there and shares a room with her, apparently befriending by her. When Kemp tries to forcibly exorcise Annie, Hennessey stands up for her and points out the lack of the Door, causing Kemp to kill him for one. After seeing his own dead body on the floor and Annie for the first time, his Door appears and they are both forcefully dragged in. Hennessey displayed far greater control over his ability than other psychics. Aside from hearing ghosts, he was able to sense the residue of Annie's presence in her home (and distinguishing it from her actually being present at the time) and he had showed that he could determine her exact location by focusing his ability.
Alan Cortez	Simon Paisley Day	Alan Cortez is a stage psychic that Annie befriended when she stumbled upon his show. Believing at first he is a fraud, Anne soon discovered he was an actual psychic only with a damaged ability. Alan explained that his ability had manifested itself around puberty, but he couldn't control it and it wrecked much of his youth because people thought he was mentally ill. He eventually became a stage performer, using his ability to help ghosts though he felt bitter about it at the time as he felt his ability had taken over his life. One day he had an accident on stage injuring his head and damaging his ability to hear most ghosts (he could communicate with Annie due to her strong presence). Annie asks him why he doesn't just quit since he got what he wanted in the accident. Alan admits the irony of the matter being that he came to see his ability as a part of him and he lost a part of himself when it went away. With Annie's help he is able to help the numerous ghosts that have been following him for weeks since he came to town. At the end of the episode he reveals to Annie that (most likely thanks to being around her) his ability is starting to heal itself and he is starting to hear the ghosts again.
Hetty	Madeleine Harris	Hetty is one of the vampire elders (or Old Ones). Recruited at a very young age, she appears to be an 8 or 9-year-old girl but as of 2010 is 462 years old. She initially appears in a promotional webisode for Series 2, in which she converses with Ivan and Daisy in a Singapore restaurant prior to her departure to join the other old ones in Bolivia. Hetty was originally responsible for recruiting Herrick as a vampire, and expresses disappointment that he was killed in such an "undignified" manner. This is expanded on in a scripted but never filmed webisode for Series 3 set in 1890, in which Herrick (then a crooked lawyer, and unaware of Hetty's nature) attempts to sell her to a brothel as a child prostitute following the death of her father: instead she attacks and feeds on him, and recruits him into the vampire species. Hetty reappears in Series 4, when she travels to Britain with the other Old Ones. She is initially mentioned in one of the episode cold opens (set in 1855) in which Fergus states that Hal and Hetty know each other and that Hetty was one of the Old Ones who fears him. Hetty is subsequently seen in the group of Old Ones who appear in the penultimate episode of Series 4 and are killed by Annie's bomb: she escapes the building before the explosion. She later reappears in the opening episode of Series 5 ("The Trinity") as a captive of Dominic Rook and the Men in Grey. In this episode, she agrees to tell Rook everything she knows about Hal (now the only other surviving Old One) in exchange for being flown back secretly to Bolivia.
Carl	Steve John Shepherd	Carl is a gay vampire and a friend of Mitchell. They shared a flat together. Carl helped Mitchell to get clean from blood in 2000 and hasn't drunken blood for more than 20 years. When Carl accidentally kills his boyfriend Dan Mitchell helps Carl to escape from the police. Carl travels to Brasil. In Brasil he gets a new boyfriend, who is a werewolf. They want to travel back to the UK.
Kathleen	Sara Pascoe	Kathleen is a young ghost mother who is dating a fireman. She and her baby son both died because of a leaky boiler. When she is on a date, Annie takes care of her son Rufus. Annie loves Rufus and doesn't want him to leave.

=== Series 3 ===
==== Recurring characters ====
Character	Actor	Description
Lia Shaman	Lacey Turner	Lia Shaman is a dead person who leads Mitchell on his journey through Purgatory to rescue Annie. It turns out that she is one of the victims of Mitchell's killing spree on a public train, being one of the twenty people he and Daisy killed on his rampage (known as the Box Tunnel twenty massacre). The revelation of her identity forces Mitchell to admit that he still sees himself as a monster even as he tries to get past what he once was. Lia also reveals that Mitchell's time and date of death has been confirmed, and he will apparently be killed by a werewolf at some not-too-distant future date, commenting that this knowledge is an apt punishment for his past sins. Although Lia appeared to be manipulating Mitchell's life from Purgatory, she later admitted that she had actually made up the story about a 'wolf-shaped bullet' to play with Mitchell's mind, intending for the 'prophecy' to drive a wedge between Mitchell, George and Nina, only for the plan to backfire when Mitchell suspected McNair and Tom instead. Lia attempted to trap Annie in Purgatory to further punish Mitchell, but she was convinced to release her when Annie forced her to recognise how out of her depth she was.
Anthony Michael McNair	Robson Green	Anthony Michael McNair, generally known simply as "McNair", is a werewolf and self-appointed vampire hunter. Fifteen years ago, McNair was a surveyor. One night, vampires abducted him and forced him to cage fight with a werewolf called Alan (It was later revealed that the vampires included Herrick). Although McNair won, he was exposed to the werewolf pathogen and turned as a result of its aftermath. He has since dedicated himself to a life as a nomadic vampire killer, and lives in a camper van with his 'adopted' adolescent son, Thomas. Despite McNair's anti-vampire prejudices, he has reached something of an accommodation with Mitchell following the latter's help in his rescuing of George, Nina and Thomas from a later vampire cage-fight: in the midst of the resulting pitched battle, the feral McNair even deliberately passed over Mitchell to attack another vampire. He and Mitchell now exist as civil enemies under an unstated truce. McNair, however, made it clear that he still believes that Mitchell will get his punishment at some point in the future. Having injured his leg, McNair returned to the house for the next full moon. Having detected the scent of the amnesiac Herrick in the upstairs attic, he went up in time to confront Herrick during his transformation. In the resulting struggle, Herrick stabbed McNair to death on instinct, in the process regaining at least some of his old drives and memories. In a letter written to Thomas and read posthumously, McNair expresses some remorse that his drive for vengeance has shaped his life and made him ruthless, and urges his adopted son not to continue the feud against vampires following his death.
Adam Jacobs	Craig Roberts	Adam Jacobs is a vampire. Turned at the age of 16, he is actually 46 years old when he first appears, although he maintains a teenage appearance and perspective. Following his turning, his parents provided him with blood in order to protect both him and their neighbours. Eventually both of Adam's parents aged and died, with his father spending his final days in the Barry hospital in which George and Nina work. Having caught Adam while he tried to feed from his father, George and Nina attempted to take him to Mitchell for training. Mitchell was reluctant to take on more responsibility as he himself was continuing to struggle with his own thirst. Instead, he arranged for Adam to stay with Richard and Emma, a seemingly middle-aged vampire couple who apparently had "a system" in place to enable them to live safely and not pose a threat to society. George and Nina returned to get him back when they realised that Richard and Emma were essentially perverts, their 'system' consisting of a BDSM-esque party where the humans allowed themselves to be drunk from. Despite the comfort that the vampires could offer him, Adam rejected the vampires' way of life, bluntly informing them that they were all perverts. Although George was willing to take on the responsibility, Adam recognised that he couldn't force them to cope with him like his parents had, deciding to make his own way in the world so that he could find out whether or not he would be dangerous on his own. After Mitchell advised him to find good people to share his life with so that they could keep him under control by 'inspiring' him with the disappointment they would feel, Adam decided to depart on the next train out of the city to see where it took him, demonstrating a marked improvement when he rejected a girl he had initially attempted to drain when she offered to go with him. In the spin-off Becoming Human, Adam formed his own small 'group' at his new school in the form of recently turned werewolf Christa and recently murdered ghost Matt, the three teaming up to investigate Matt's murder. He returned in Season Four in a relationship with Yvonne, the headmistress of a girls' school where Adam had been 'hunting'; although the relationship was complicated when it was discovered that Yvonne was a succubus who could seduce and kill men- Adam only having survived the relationship because he was already dead-, Annie helped Adam realise that he still cared about her anyway.
Detective Nancy Reed	Erin Richards	Nancy Reed is a young detective- nicknamed 'Nancy Drew' by her colleagues, much to her frustration- involved in the investigation of the Box Tunnel 20 massacre. She responded to an anonymous tip (from Nina) to talk with Mitchell about the massacre, but left empty-handed. After Annie followed Nancy back to the station and saw a photograph of Lia as one of the victims, she convinced Mitchell to tell Nancy about Daisy, but Mitchell was still only able to provide limited information due to her vampire status. While Nancy was cleaning up, she was confronted by Herrick, who showed her the newspaper clipping 'diary' of Mitchell's past exploits, but Mitchell took it from her before she could leave. During her subsequent investigation, she managed to acquire a fingerprint from Mitchell which she took to the police pathologist Cooper. Cooper positively identified it as being identical to those found in the Box Tunnel 20 carriage, but at the same time revealed himself as a vampire working within the police force to protect Mitchell and other vampires. Cooper knocked Nancy out, but was then staked by Annie. Nancy subsequently led the police raid which arrested Mitchell, only to be killed by an enraged and bloodthirsty Herrick when he succumbed to his vampiric instincts.

==== Secondary characters ====
Character	Actor	Description
Sasha	Alexandra Roach	Sasha is a zombie woman that follows Annie, George and Mitchell into their home. At first the trio is reacting and hostile towards Sasha, even though they are supernaturals themselves. According to Lars Roberts Krautschick and Fabian Ruder, the disgust by the trio is visualized to the audience when Sasha removes a loose toenail from her rotting body. Later Sasha gets more close to the housemates. Sasha and Annie want to spend a girls night out and are joined by Mitchell and George. However, Sasha's integration to the group is stopped when she dies because her body isn't functioning anymore.
Graham	Tony Maudsley	Graham is an alleged vampire fan of Mitchell's, who came to the hospital to learn from his 'hero', deliberately dressing and styling his hair to match Mitchell despite being significantly overweight. Although he initially tried to subtly blackmail Mitchell to let him stay by threatening to reveal his role in the Box Tunnel 20 massacre to Annie, Mitchell eventually threw him out when he began to flirt with her, denouncing Graham as a pathetic wannabe with no friends or personality of his own. Attempting to get revenge, Graham set out to stage his own train massacre, resolving to be the new vampire 'legend'. Although slightly sorry for Graham after he admitted that he killed his own children after his transformation, Mitchell staked Graham in order to stop him hurting anyone else, Graham's last words being to ask Mitchell to tell people that he liked Graham to give him some kind of reputation.
George Sands, Senior	James Fleet	George Sands, Senior is George's father. When growing up, George regarded his father as a boring but decent father, with no problems such as gambling or alcoholism to detract from his role as a father, but he lost touch with his son after George was turned into a werewolf. His relationship with his wife subsequently became increasingly distant, to the point that she began to have an affair with George's old P.E. teacher. When Annie saw a notice in the paper about George Snr.'s death, George went home to attend the funeral, but saw what he believed was his father's 'ghost' at the funeral. Learning that his father had apparently died in a fire in his shed, George told him about the Door to try to help him understand why he might still be staying around. However, when George and Nina found George Snr. eating crisps in his camper van, he revealed that he and a friend of his in the police had found the shed burnt to the ground with an unidentified, apparently homeless man inside it, George faking his death to try to get a new start, going along with the 'ghost' story to spend time with his son. George and Nina were able to convince him to assert himself to regain his wife, George Snr. subsequently punching his wife's lover after he insulted George and George Snr. George Snr. and his wife subsequently took the camper van on a trip to Cornwall to regain the spark in their marriage.
Ruth Sands	Marion Bailey	Ruth Sands is the mother of George. After George has left, she has started an affair with George's former P.E. teacher Marcus Logue. George hates the teacher and wants his mother to get back with his father.
Edgar Wyndham	Lee Ingleby	Edgar Wyndham is one of the Old Ones, a caste of revered vampire elders who command the obedience of other vampires. The Old Ones are based in South America after having left Europe sometime in the past to avoid detection. Wyndham, who declares himself to be about 1,000 years old, is introduced towards the end of the last episode of series 3 posing as a senior police officer while he sorts out the problems caused by Mitchell's arrest that threatened to reveal the existence of vampires to mankind and put at risk vampire plans for the world. He arrives at Honolulu Heights at the climax of the Series 3 finale, just in time to halt Mitchell's attempt to end his own life via staking at the hands of George. Wyndham states that the vampires are now taking over the world and that the only reason that they are not taking action against George, Nina and Annie is his curiosity about Annie's potential for power and about the outcome of Nina's pregnancy. He also states that he has plans for Mitchell and demands that the younger vampire comes with him, stating that he'll use Mitchell as an "attack dog" to kill others at his order and whim. Mitchell is compelled to agree but at the last minute George, horrified at what this will mean for his friend, finally takes action and stakes Mitchell to save him from being used in that way. Afterwards, George states to Wyndham "I think you'll have a fight on your hands." Despite Wyndham's end-of-series establishment as a potential main antagonist, this was not developed further: at the start of Season 4 it's revealed that George killed him soon after killing Mitchell.

=== Series 4 ===
==== Recurring characters ====
Character	Actor	Description
Eve Sands	Gina Bramhill (plus various infant performers)	Eve Sands was the daughter of George and Nina. As an infant, Eve was conceived while both of her parents were in wolf form and was therefore initially suspected to be the first werewolf to be born (rather than "made" via infection). Events in The Eve of the War, when she failed to transform at her first full moon, demonstrated that this was not the case and that she was apparently a normal human (albeit retaining some kind of supernatural ability as she is able to see Annie). However, at the same time Eve was identified (by the vampire Regus) as the prophesied "War Child" who would at some point in the future destroy the vampire race. With both of her parents dead, Eve's guardianship was taken over by Annie and her new companions Tom and Hal (with, for a while, some indirect backup from Regus). During the duration of Series 4, the baby Eve lived under the threat of extermination from both the Barry vampires and the vampire Old Ones en route from South America. She also appeared to be being stalked by the ghost of a young woman from the future. The ghost in question (initially credited as "The Woman") was the ruthless former leader of a London-based human resistance movement during the time of vampire dominion over the world. In the future, with the resistance gradually losing the battle, she had consulted stolen vampire lore and found out deeply troubling information about Eve's role as War Child. In an attempt to destroy the War Child, she had herself killed in order to pass into Purgatory as a ghost. Purgatory's coterminous existence with all times enabled her to access the past and mount a series of campaigns in order to destroy Eve in the present. She attempted several methods including autosuggestion via radio and television (in the manner of Purgatory's Gatekeepers, as seen in Series 2) and sending another ghost (Kirby) back to the living world as an assassin. The Woman's full identity and agenda — as well as the full nature of her knowledge regarding the War Child — was initially unrevealed, although she apparently knew a great deal about Eve's mother Nina and was therefore able to provide Kirby with enough private information for him to convince Annie that he had been sent by Nina to help them. The Woman's true identity was revealed in "Puppy Love" and expanded upon in "Making History", when she revealed herself to Annie and addressed her as "Mum". She was the adult version of Eve, attempting to destroy herself in an attempt to destroy the future which she lived in, and which had been formed due to the vampire prophecies/parchments about her; the Old One Mr. Snow points out (episode 8) that their piece of the parchments state that Eve's death would prevent the Old One's plan to take over the world. Snow tells Annie he will help Annie protect Eve, and speculates that Eve would allow the vampires to win because humans would be so busy looking to Eve to save them that they wouldn't rally themselves against the vampires until it was too late. The adult Eve showed Annie what the future was like (a vampire tyranny in which all but the vampires were dead, dying or farmed for blood) and attempted to persuade Annie to avert the future by killing baby Eve herself. Annie's love for the infant Eve made her reluctant to do this, or to abandon her role as protector. Annie eventually caused Eve's death in the final episode of Series 4 (The War Child) when her only remaining option was to trigger an explosion which destroyed the Old Ones and ended their plans for world conquest. This explosion also killed baby Eve, proving that the parchments were correct in predicting "that Eve's death is the key to humanity's survival" (stated by Milo in episode 8) by killing the scheming Old Ones (though two are seen escaping first) without actually killing the world's 'average' vampires. Eve's (and the Old Ones') death also concluded Annie's own "unfinished business" on Earth, finally allowing her to pass into the afterlife through her own Door. Arriving there, Annie found baby Eve and also met the adult Eve one last time before the latter dissipated and vanished. Before fading from existence, adult Eve thanked Annie and reassured her that the terrible future Eve had grown up into (and the person she'd been forced to become) had both now been erased. Annie then took baby Eve through a further door within the afterlife, with a strong implication that Eve's parents (and Mitchell) were on the other side of it.
Nick Cutler	Andrew Gower	Nick Cutler was a Barry-based vampire, . A high-ranking member of the Barry vampire community, he worked as a lawyer and eventually replaced first Griffin and then Fergus as de facto leader, albeit presiding over a rapidly shrinking membership. Cutler had a sarcastic and restless demeanour and a more modern outlook to the vampire 'world domination' initiative than most of his vampire peers, expressing frustration at their inability to learn from history and to make new plans. Cutler was part of the initial plot to trick George out of Honolulu Heights and seize Eve, and survived the subsequent massacre. His deviousness was shown in several areas: when the journalist Peter (seeking to prove the existence of vampires) trapped himself and Cutler in a hotel room with a cross painted on the inside door, Cutler escaped by killing Peter and using his body as a shield against the cross. Cutler was recruited as a vampire in 1950 by Hal (at the time cruel, committed to evil and posing as a crime boss). He was targeted as a replacement lawyer for the vampires following the death of their last one. Cutler was reluctant to kill humans in the beginning, although he began to cooperate once he began craving blood to the point of addiction. Some time after his turning, Hal demanded that Cutler kill his own wife in order to "shed his human life". Following Cutler's refusal Hal secretly trapped and drained her himself, tricking Cutler into drinking her blood unknowingly, before showing him her body as a lesson. The lesson must have worked as in the present Cutler has no problem manipulating or killing humans although he still feels guilt, confusion and anger at Hal for making him 'abandon his entire species'. During the whole of Series 4, Cutler devised and put into action a vampire-protecting plot, intending to set up an anti-werewolf panic amongst humans which would encourage the latter to seek vampire assistance. He groomed an unwitting Tom as his main tool in this, first secretly filming him transforming and then winning his trust by helping him escape assault charges (Cutler persuaded police that the CCTV footage of the alleged assault showed that Tom wasn't actually fighting anyone — in fact, the vampire Tom fought was invisible to camera). When Golda, an agent of the Old Ones arrived in Barry, attempting to capture Tom and jeopardise Cutler's plans for him, Cutler first attempted to use Tom to eliminate Golda, and subsequently chose to stake her himself when the opportunity arose. Cutler went on to post the video of George and Tom transforming up onto the Internet, winning the attention of various websurfers and newsgroup. He went on to stage a "grand reveal" in which a wolf-form Tom would be tricked into massacring humans on camera, resulting in footage which would go viral and incite an anti-werewolf movement. When Mr Snow and the Old Ones arrive Cutler attempted to present the results to them as a tribute but was astonished to discover that there was nothing relating to his plan on any news channel (Unknown to Cutler, an independent organisation involving Mr Rook had already gone to work on the cover-up). An infuriated Mr Snow verbally humiliated Cutler. Enraged, Cutler turns on the Old Ones and proceeds to carry out his own world domination plans, beginning with an attempt on baby Eve's life. By sheer willpower, Cutler forced his way into Honolulu Heights, although entering without an invitation caused pain and disfiguring burning all over his body. He was finally killed by Annie, who staked him via telekinesis before he could complete his goal.

==== Secondary characters ====
Character	Actor	Description
Griffin	Alex Jennings	Griffin was the leader of the Barry vampire coven. Like Herrick, he was a police officer, the local chief constable. He was responsible for the murder of Nina, and subsequently sent George flowers as a mocking gesture. He kidnapped Eve, and subsequently George, with the intention of presenting them as trophies for the arriving Old Ones. He was killed by George at the conclusion of episode 1 when the partially transformed George forcibly fed Griffin his blood, triggering a staking-like reaction.
Dewi	Darren Evans	Dewi is a Welsh teenager and recent vampire recruit. Though disrespected by his fellow vampires in the Barry coven, he was a key player in the subterfuge involving the kidnapping of Eve. His subsequent dissatisfaction with his treatment (and apparent indifference to the vampire race war) led to him changing sides, leading Annie and Tom to the coven to perform a rescue. In the subsequent massacre, he staked one of his fellow vampires and consequently marks himself as a traitor. Tom subsequently gave Dewi his camper van and urged him to get as far away from Barry as possible. Dewi's current whereabouts are unknown.
Regus	Mark Williams	Regus is a vampire archivist, academic and scientist (also known as The Vampire Recorder) who is first encountered serving the needs of the Barry coven and preparing for the arrival of the Old Ones. Beneath a bumbling exterior, his own motives appear to be ambiguous: he is the first to recognise Eve as "the War Child" who is apparently destined to destroy the vampire race, yet he is also committed to her survival. Like Cutler, he survives the Barry massacre and subsequently escapes, having given Annie some information regarding Eve's future role. Regus was protecting Eve to justify his existence as a recorder of the vampire history, having kept himself confined for centuries doing research. Although he tried to persuade Annie to depart Barry with Eve, after she, Hal and Tom killed the group of vampires Fergus had taken to try and claim her, he decided that Eve was safe where she was. He and Michaela subsequently departed to travel the world, Hal and Annie comparing them to Ivan and Daisy.
Leo	Louis Mahoney	Leo is a werewolf. Since 1955, he has been living in Southend (with the vampire Hal and the ghost Pearl) where he also runs a barber's shop. Now in old age and poor health, he risks dying every time that he transforms between man and wolf. As both the barber's shop and the house in which the trio live are registered in his name due to him being the only one of the group who could pass for human, his death will result in his housemates' eviction and loss of livelihood. Having received a message from what appeared to be an angel, he encouraged the others to visit Honolulu Heights in the belief that Eve could help him, but in the end he died of old age after admitting his love for Pearl, allowing the two of them to pass on.
Pearl	Tamla Kari	Pearl is a ghost. Since 1955, she has been sharing a house in Southend with the vampire Hal and the werewolf Leo. She initially did not get along with Annie, slightly mocking her for changing her 'support cast' in a few years where Pearl has remained with Hal and Leo for over fifty years, but they eventually achieved a kind of friendship, Pearl even teaching Annie how to keep Eve safe by 'swaddling' her, wrapping Eve in Annie's clothes so that she is invisible to those who cannot see Annie; Pearl apparently did the same thing to help Leo see a concert, smuggling him into the front row under her dress. After Leo admitted his love for Pearl just before his death, the two passed on together.
Fergus	Anthony Flanagan	Fergus is a vampire in the Barry coven, working as a police constable. Following Griffin's death in episode 1, Fergus takes over as the primary antagonist working against the Honolulu Heights community, he was the partner of Hal during his time as an Old One. He was killed by Hal after he revealed Hal's past, but not before cutting Michaela's throat.
Michaela Thompson	Laura Patch	Michaela Thompson is a would-be Gothic poet who appeared in "The Graveyard Shift". When she became caught up in a vampire raid on the cafe where Hal and Tom worked, they were forced to take her away with them. She was injured during the subsequent confrontation with Fergus, forcing Regus to turn her to save her life. The two subsequently departed to travel the world, Hal and Annie comparing them to Ivan and Daisy.
Alfie Kirby	James Lance	Alfie Kirby is a ghost character from 1975 who appeared in episode 4, claiming to have been a nursery teacher in life who had been sent by Nina to help Annie with Eve. However, after he killed a GP who visited the house, he went on to subtly sow discord among the group, tricking Tom into thinking that Hal and Annie were ignoring his birthday when they simply didn't know about it, provoking Hal into attacking him while he was holding Eve to give the impression that Hal had gone berserk, and attempting to drive Annie to lose her sense of self by implying that she drove others away. It was subsequently revealed that he had been sent by the future ghost seeking to kill Eve, and that he had been a serial killer known as the 'Toy Man' in life — being insulted when Hal and Tom didn't know about him — who targeted mothers by giving their children toys. He was apparently destroyed by the returned Annie when he was about to stab Eve.
Yvonne Bradshaw	Selina Griffiths	Yvonne Bradshaw was the headmistress of a girls' school that Adam Jacobs visited, the two becoming lovers despite the apparent age gap (Yvonne being in her mid-forties and Adam apparently a teenager). When the duo fled to Honolulu Heights to escape the press attention caused by their relationship, Hal realised that Yvonne was actually a succubus — her father having been a demon. Although Yvonne had an unlikely history of attracting romantic attention from various men, the only two which she had fully taken as lovers had died while having sex with her — this turns out to be part of her succubus nature, and Adam has only survived the experience because he was technically already dead. Although shocked at this revelation, Yvonne and Adam eventually reconciled when Adam saw a news broadcast about Yvonne in a pub and realised that he still cared about her.
Allison Larkin	Ellie Kendrick	Allison Larkin is a high-school student and enthusiastic debater who also happens to be a werewolf. Her condition means that she is blighted by fears that she will kill those close to her. Discovering Cutler's online footage of Tom and George's videoed transformation provides her with an opportunity to run away from home and do something about this. She tracks down Tom, using her analytical and computer skills: introduced to his practise of vampire killing, she challenges him to talk to the vampires instead and persuade them to join forces with the werewolves and protect each other from exposure. Her debating skills prove inadequate when faced with the brutal ruthlessness of the vampires, and she suggests to Tom that she and he can learn from each other. Tom teaches her how to kill vampires, while she helps him with articulacy and debate (and the two speculate about other issues such as what would happen if werewolves lived on other planets or moons). As Allison and Tom train together, they begin to fall in love, prompting a double-date with Hal and Alex: this is interrupted when Cutler sets Allison and Tom up to confront and kill the vampire Kane. Their defeat of Kane leaves Allison aroused and she attempts to pull Tom into a full sexual relationship, but he is dismayed that he is turning her into a killer. Allison hunts Golda, but Tom dissuades her from killing: he persuades her that her parents still love her, and that there are ways of staying human even if she turns into a werewolf once a month. Allison still wants to stay with Tom and he finally has to reject her, ordering her to leave and claiming that he doesn't care about her (in order to convince her to return to her human life and escape the violence of his). Despite her departure, Allison's influence stays with Tom and inspires his decision to end his vampire-slaying activities.
Emrys	Anthony O'Donnell	Emrys is a cantankerous old man who lives next door to Honolulu Heights. Embittered by life (not least due to his wife having cuckolded and abandoned him in favour of her piano teacher), Emrys' path fatally crosses Annie's when one day, enraged by the noise of baby Eve's crying, he bangs on the door and threatens her. Believing that he is one of the vampires attacking the house, Annie herself attacks Emrys and hurls him over the garden wall before she can realise her mistake. Emrys is killed by the fall but immediately returns as a ghost. To assuage her guilt, Annie takes it upon herself to help him solve the "unfinished business" keeping him from fully passing on. This proves difficult, partially due to Emrys' manipulative dishonesty, and partially because of his own lack of awareness about the meaning of his life and emotions. For a while it seems that he will have to be accepted into the Honolulu Heights community (although his sly, cynical and lecherous attitudes infuriate the other members of the household). Annie's suggestion that Emrys confronts his ex-wife and resolves the issues of his failed marriage is also unsuccessful, until he finally realises that what he wants to do is not to reconcile himself with his ex-wife, but to vengefully torment and spook her. With Annie's help, Emrys carries out a brief and spiteful poltergeist-style haunting of his ex-wife and her lover, and satisfies his need for revenge and mischief. He subsequently departs into the afterlife through his door, though not before suggesting to Annie that her own "unfinished business", when she comes round to doing it, might "not be a nice thing."
Golda	Amanda Abbington	Golda is a senior vampire and an agent of the Old Ones, who arrives in Barry to oversee their planned arrival. Aggressive and domineering in style, she presents herself as a 1980s-style female power manager, complete with two male followers (one of whom she has torn the tongue from during a past liaison). On arrival she relentlessly bullies and demeans Cutler, expressing total scorn and disinterest in him and his plans and treating him as just another minion. Having learned about Tom's presence in Barry, she orders Cutler to capture him for a dogfight to amuse the Old Ones: with Cutler's own plans for Tom thus threatened, he begins to move against her. Golda's own minions are eventually staked by Tom and Allison: emboldened, Allison then goes after Golda herself, only to be initially physically overwhelmed and almost killed. Tom intervenes when he breaks up the duel in order to stop Allison becoming a killer, and to force a more amicable resolution. Golda appears to agree to the settlement, but subsequently threatens Allison again. Immediately afterwards, she is staked to death by Cutler, who takes his own opportunity to remove a rival and present himself as an ally.
Kane	Marshall Griffin	Kane is a vampire follower of Golda's. Aggressive, attention-seeking and stupid, his fondness for action movies leads him to insert various semi-appropriate fighting-man catchphrases and cliches into his speeches and statement, despite these attempts generally being clumsy paraphrases which make little or no sense. He is, however, a strong fighter in his own right: he initially coming off best in a confrontation with Tom and Allison, but is bemused and irritated by Tom's own clumsy attempts to negotiate rather than fight. Kane's downfall comes when he enacts one of his favourite cliches — holding Allison hostage while he taunts Tom. Allison throws him off-guard by rubbing blood from her own bleeding nose into his eyes, which allows Tom to stake him: Kane dies while clutching vainly for an appropriate catchphrase.
Mr Snow	Mark Gatiss	Mr Snow is the eldest of the vampire Old Ones and the oldest recorded vampire on the show (at the age of 3,000 – he knew "the Pharaohs and the son of the carpenter" ). Due to his extreme age, Mr Snow has several unusual vampire features which include pale white skin, visible black veins under his skin and rotted teeth in place of fangs. It is stated in a press release that Mr Snow isn't his true name but a name given to him by the other vampires (no-one knows his true name, and he has never told anyone) and that he is the only Old One who doesn't fear Hal. His first appearance was in an online Series 4 prequel showing the Old Ones' trip over from Bolivia (in which he threatens the human crew of the ship and demands that they give him a victim), and his second was in the closing minutes of Series 4 episode 7, "Making History" (in which he leads several Old Ones into the meeting point at Barry but, finding no one their to greet them, turns and asks the others if they are hungry). He is next seen in an online clip in which he and two unknown female Old Ones meet with the werewolf Milo, when Snow inquires as to the situation of the Baby Eve and the Honolulu Heights residents, then remarks that he thinks the prime minister will "taste like buttered toast". Snow attempts to lure Hal back to the vampires, confident that Hal's resistance of his urges was simply a phase. Mr. Snow e is destroyed when Annie triggers explosives that Tom had prepared. The blast also kills baby Eve, who Tom had brought to Mr. Snow, not understanding why the Old Ones were promising to protect her and keep her alive. Eve's death results in a variation of the vampire prophecy/parchments that Mr. Snow feared – proving "that Eve's death is the key to humanity's survival" (stated by Milo in episode 8) by killing the scheming Old Ones (though two are seen escaping first) without actually killing the world's 'average' vampires.
Milo	Michael Wildman	Milo is a werewolf working as an associate of the vampire Old Ones, first appearing as part of Mr Snow's landing party. By various methods and actions (which he has implied were gruelling, unpleasant and possibly highly compromising) he has won the tolerance of the vampires, who use him as muscle, for bodyguard purposes and for various missions. Strong, determined and cool-headed, Milo views himself as a survivor and pragmatist, doing what he needs to do in order to work with the strongest faction: nonetheless it does appear that he is sensitive about his choices, accepting the titles of "traitor" and "opportunist" but rejecting that of "coward". He survived the explosion which killed the Old Ones at the end of Series 4 (having been outside the building fighting off Tom). His current whereabouts are unknown.
Arthur (credited as "Archivist")	Fred Pearson	Arthur is another member of the as-yet unidentified organisation as Mr Rook. Unlike Rook (who appears to be an active field agent) Arthur appears to be predominantly a clerk, archivist and facility organiser. He also appears to have a convivial working relationship with Rook.
Isaac Daniels	Matthew Ashforde	Isaac Daniels is taking care of George's and Nina's daughter Eve in an alternative world in 2022. In this reality he is killed by Mr Snow.

=== Series 5 ===
==== Recurring characters ====
Character	Actor	Description
Crumb	Colin Hoult	Crumb is a newly recruited vampire who first appears in episode 1 of series 5. His original name was Ian Cram: "Crumb" was a derogatory nickname (or habitual mishearing) of his surname by others. Following his recruitment as a vampire, he takes on the formerly despised nickname out of a sense of vengeance, desiring to be "the crumb that choked the world." He has also describes himself as "the world's worst nightmare: the victim that suddenly gets super powers." Crumb was recruited out of desperation by Hal, who had unwittingly caused his death in a traffic accident. Hal recruited Crumb in order to save his life as best he could (although there's also a possibility, voiced openly by Crumb, that Hal also needed to create a potentially vicious enemy in order to assert himself as "good" in contrast). Hal originally kept Crumb prisoner in the basement at Honolulu Heights, although he kept this secret from Tom and Alex: when they discovered Crumb's presence, Alex released him. During Crumb's life as a human, he was persistently bullied, ignored or passed over, resulting in a growing sense of aggrievement. He was also single, with his only known relatives or intimates being his sister and niece (whose photograph he kept in his wallet). At the time of his recruitment, Crumb was on the verge of being bullied out of his low-level office job, and he took this particular resentment with him when defining himself as a vampire. When faced with his final dismissal, he opted for a generalised vengeance on humanity, locked himself in the office with his former colleagues, then killed and fed on his replacement. He has since been taken into the custody of Dominic Rook and the Men in Grey, who also covered up the murder. Crumb's existence and murderous intent has also served to test and strengthen the bond between Hal, Tom and Alex, who have all agreed to share the responsibility for letting Crumb loose on the world. Crumb's confused, destructive and predatory tendencies are currently being manipulated by Dominic Rook, who is using them to demonstrate to Alistair Frith that the Men in Grey are still needed to protect against supernatural threat. To this end, Rook stage-managed a meeting between Crumb and Crumb's sister and niece at the height of Crumb's blood craving. Crumb killed and fed on both women, and this was filmed by Rook for Frith's viewing, after which Crumb was apparently released by Rook, stating that his imprisonment by the Men in Grey was "sort of over now". While Crumb's human emotions are being rapidly eroded by his growing vampire nature, he refers to this in particular as "a sore point" and has exhibited flashes of remorse, horror and grief over his actions. Crumb has recently recruited a new vampire — Alan, one of the Men in Grey who chose to join him following a moral crisis. Crumb and Alan were eventually confronted by Hal and Alex, Hal attempting to offer them another chance. Frustrated at his life and shaken at his possible future, Crumb eventually drank a glass of blood, which turned out to be Tom's blood, the werewolf blood causing Crumb to collapse.
Captain Hatch	Phil Davis	Captain Hatch is the name used by a human being possessed by the Devil. First encountered as a lunatic in 1918, Hatch was kidnapped and deliberately used by Emil Parsons as a vessel to contain the Devil when the latter was summoned during a blood ritual, the Devil having been provoking the vampire/werewolf war to draw on the energy of their struggle. The ritual failed, since it required the blood of Lady Christine, the werewolf leader, and Hal, along with a ghostly necromancer to work properly, however, Hal substituted the blood of a random vampire soldier, used in the enabling the Devil– still in Hatch's body– to kill two of his three summoners and escape. While Hatch's spine was seen to shatter during the Devil's entry into his body, he was subsequently seen running from the site of the ritual, leaving his true physical state uncertain. Hatch is subsequently encountered in the present day, living semi-anonymously as a pensioner in the Barry Grand Hotel. At this point Hatch appears to be paraplegic and a wheelchair user. He displays some of his true nature in the form of negative human characteristics (bitterness, viciousness, outspoken racism and covert manipulative behaviour) and in his appearance (disheveled verging on decaying), as well as having a minor effect on his environment by causing freshly-picked flowers to decay just by passing by them. Towards the end of his debut episode, it's revealed that he is behind the spate of suicides at the hotel when he whispers "a little secret" into the ear of the maid Sophie, who's subsequently driven to kill herself (and, before she does so, to write "He Is Risen" in letters of blood on the wall). Hatch has gone on to foment further trouble, conflict and suicide at the hotel, creating the spiritual pain and misery on which he feeds. He is using this to strengthen himself in order to regain his godhood, following which he plans to ravage the world. When Hal and Tom take jobs at the hotel where he is currently staying, Hatch sees a prime opportunity to gain plenty of energy from a vampire/werewolf conflict and devotes himself to promoting discord between them. He feels threatened by the trinity relationship of Tom, Hal and Alex and is working on plans to isolate and "get rid of" Alex. He has demonstrated a working relationship with the Men With Sticks And Rope (whom he has referred to as "my boys"): this is sufficient to get them to attempt to seize Alex and drag her into the afterlife, Hatch using his powers to trap Alex in the house before Oliver, a child ghost, manages to defeat the Men With Sticks And Rope by closing the door and cutting them off from their life source. He later attempted to provoke another conflict by engineering a situation where Bobby, a socially awkward werewolf, would be unleashed upon the hotel after his transformation and Hal forced to fight him, but this plan failed when Tom contained Bobby himself.
Patsy Ritter	Claire Cage	Patsy Ritter is the manager at the Barry Grand Hotel, at which Tom and Hal obtain new day jobs at the start of Series 5. She is attempting to ignore or make light of the suicide rate amongst the staff at the hotel. She has an overt sexual attraction to Hal and appears to have hired him purely on that basis; conversely, she treats Tom with a bullying contempt. With this in mind, Hatch manipulates her into staging an "Employee of the Month" contest in order to promote rivalry and discord between Hal and Tom, although their ultimate loyalty to each other means that the scheme fails. Hatch later uses Patsy's existing stress levels to trigger an apparent cerebral haemorrhage in her before suggesting that she "takes a dip in the sea."
Alistair Frith	Toby Whithouse	Alistair Frith is the British Home Secretary, who first appears in episode 1 of series 5. Ruthlessly devoted to his own career, Alistair is in the process of executing government cuts which will, among other things, dissolve Rook's "Men in Grey" department and hand its responsibilities over to the police service (with the clear implication that this will be in a much-reduced form). This in turn is driving Rook to desperate measures.

==== Secondary characters ====
Character	Actor	Description
Alan	Hamza Jeetooa	Alan is a DoDD employee serving under Dominic Rook, and first appeared in episode 1 of Series 5. Following recent development (including the strategic sacrifice of Crumb's sister and niece) Alan has come to the conclusion that his work with the team has seriously compromised his humanity to the point that he has little of it left: this in turn has led to him asking Crumb to recruit him as a vampire. Crumb was initially reluctant to do so, but following a sequence in which the two bonded over tabletop role-playing game trivia at the end of episode 2, Crumb granted his request. Alan was killed by Crumb after he patronized him and tried to make him drink blood in episode 4, series 5.
Lady Catherine Glass	Victoria Ross	Lady Catherine Glass is a werewolf who appeared in episode 1 of series 5. Active in the early twentieth century, she was the leader of the werewolves by 1918 (in which capacity she enjoyed a semi-adversarial, semi-flirtatious relationship with Hal). In the same year, during a period of particularly savage conflict between the vampires and the werewolves, she attempted an assassination of Hal which failed: she subsequently joined him in an attempt to stop the conflict by occult means. Reasoning that the Devil was fuelling the conflict in order to draw sustenance and enjoyment from it, they joined with the ghost Emil Parson in a ritual trinity to create a spell to draw and bind the Devil. When this failed (due to unwitting sabotage by Hal) Lady Catherine was killed by the Devil as he escaped.
Emil Parsons	Jeremy Swift	Emil Parsons is a ghost who appeared in episode 1 of series 5. He had the form of a portly middle-aged man: a lustful and voyeuristic character in life, he retained a penchant for pornography and had originally died when falling out of a tree while attempting to spy into his sister-in-law's bathroom. He also possessed extensive occult knowledge, including skills as a necromancer. Emil was encountered in 1918 when he was approached by Hal and Lady Catherine and asked to perform a spell to summon and bind the Devil. In order to do this, he used a blood ritual to become part of an occult trinity of werewolf, ghost and vampire (with Hal and Lady Catherine as the other two parts). The ritual failed due to Hal substituting the blood of one of his lieutenants for his own blood: as a result, Emil was dissipated (apparently passing on) and the Devil escaped.
Martin	Wayne Cater	Martin is Crumb's boss and appears in episode 1 of series 5. A devious, stubborn and overbearing man with a tendency for malapropisms (such as "brains like a brick shithouse"), he disliked Crumb and was openly engineering to get him fired from his job so that Martin's own nephew could take it. Crumb's brief disappearance (while being recruited as a vampire) gave him the opportunity to carry out this plan in full. This also resulted in Crumb's final decision to pursue a generalised vengeance as the core of his new life, with his first victim being Martin's nephew. The murder was covered up by Dominic Rook and DoDD: Martin himself was then murdered by Rook when he refused to participate in the cover-up.
Oliver	Benjamin Greaves-Neal	Oliver is a child ghost haunting Honolulu Heights, who appeared in episode 2 of Series 5. Appearing unexpectedly and demanding attention, he alternately exasperated and engaged Alex, who for a while saw him as a substitute for the younger brothers she had lost. A former inhabitant of the building before its reinvention as a B'n'B, Oliver was originally one of the two ill-fated children of a Victorian industrialist. His Victorian attitudes (in particular to class, race and deportment) caused some friction between him and the present-day housemates. More of Oliver's story emerged over the course of the episode. He was haunted by guilt over the death of his disabled younger brother Albert, whom he had resented and who had accidentally drowned during a game of hide and seek: this guilt had later prompted Oliver to kill himself with rat poison. It soon became clear that Oliver was literally haunted — by the ghost of Albert, who appeared in Honolulu Heights dripping with the water of his drowning. It was also revealed that Oliver was being used by the Gatekeepers (and, ultimately, Hatch) as part of a plot to seize Alex and drag her into the afterlife: a squad of Gatekeepers, given extra power by Hatch, came after the three ghosts with the intention of dragging them into Hell. This plot ultimately failed thanks to a mixture of his last-minute repentance and Alex's quick thinking. Both Oliver and Albert (who was only pursuing his brother in order to try to comfort him) passed on into the afterlife and closed their ghost door behind them, marooning the squad of Gatekeepers in the world of the living (where, cut off from their life force, they soon dissipated).
Lady Mary	Amanda Hale	Lady Mary is a ghost who appears in episode 3 of Series 5. She is an eighteenth-century ghost, dead for two hundred and fifty years, who haunts a stately home near Barry and is a friend of Hal's. Initially presenting as a decorous young woman with period speech and manners, it's revealed that this is simply a front which she puts on for Hal's benefit, and that she is in fact well versed in contemporary culture, slang and manners. She and Hal enjoy a mutually-delusive relationship. One of Hal's former victims during his blood-drinking days, Mary believes that she was his final victim and that their ongoing friendship has prevented him from killing again; to sustain this, she has rejected many opportunities to pass over into the afterlife. Hal, meanwhile, maintains a protective friendship with her out of a sense of guilt and duty, and has not revealed that he has killed other victims after her. This situation is upset by the involvement of Alex, who discovers Mary's true personality. Mary is delighted to have a new friend who she feels can understand and share her present-day interests (which include sexual voyeurism, mental eavesdropping and malicious manipulation of living people). Alex is alarmed at Mary's unbalanced lack of restraint and perspective, believing that a similar fate might await her if she remains an earthbound ghost for too long. Setting herself the task of breaking the delusion which she thinks stops Mary from passing over, Alex engineers a confrontation in which both Hal and Mary learn the truth about each other. While both are horrified, Mary is enraged and later attempts to stake Hal by telekinesis, only barely fended off and persuaded against it by Tom and Alex. Breaking her friendship with Hal, but not yet presented with any more doors to the afterlife, Mary resolves to leave the stately home and go travelling instead, but not before warning Alex that her own efforts to keep Hal from killing are doomed to failure.
Larry Chrysler	Julian Barratt	Larry Chrysler is a werewolf who appears in episode 3 of Series 5. Originally a television weatherman and celebrity, he is attacked in a studio car park by a roaming werewolf — which he fends off, but not before being infected. Nine months later he arrives at Honolulu Heights, where his werewolf state is immediately recognized by both Tom and Hal. Eager to communicate with another werewolf, star-struck, and self-conscious about his own lack of social skills and professional success, Tom strikes up a friendship with Larry: he brings him back to live at Honolulu Heights and takes him on as a teacher figure. With help from Hal, a crestfallen Tom eventually realises that Larry is a fraud. Far from being a successful celebrity and speaker, Larry is destitute. Since becoming a werewolf, he has lost discipline and succumbed to various urges including infidelity and unreliability, which resulted in him losing his marriage, job and social position. Bitter and resentful, Larry refuses to take any personal responsibility for what has happened: instead he claims that his lycanthropy denied him any choices ("the wolf took it all") and that Tom's attempts to better himself will always result in similar failure. Heartbroken and despairing, Tom temporarily leaves Honolulu Heights to live rough, until he is persuaded to return by Hal and Alex, who emphasise their faith in his ability to cope with his condition. Hal, meanwhile, has given Larry a final warning and ordered him to leave. Unwilling to depart from Honolulu Heights to return to living rough (and, perhaps, nursing a deathwish) Larry instead goads Hal into assuming full vampire state and attacking him. Hal strangles Larry to death with a telephone cord. Keeping this new murder secret from his housemates, Hal subsequently calls Dominic Rook to come and dispose of the body, therefore bringing Rook and DoDD directly back into the lives of himself, Tom and Alex.
Bobby	Ricky Grover	Bobby is a werewolf character due to appear in episode 4 of Series 5. Previews and advance information suggest that Tom takes him on as a protégé and that he moves into Honolulu Heights.
Natasha Miles	Kathryn Prescott	Natasha Miles is Toms girlfriend. But she also lets Hal drink her blood, as she sees that Hal can't control himself and might attack some of the guest. The devil manipulates her, so that she commits suicide in front of Hal. Tom thinks that Hal has killed her, that's why he wants to fight against Hal. Natasha however reappears as a ghost and tells Alex that Hal didn't kill her and tried to save her. She says that she was tricked by the devil.
