= One of Us (TV series) =

British drama television miniseries

- Also known as: Retribution
- Genre: Drama
- Created by: Harry and Jack Williams
- Written by: Harry and Jack Williams
- Directed by: William McGregor
- Theme music composer: Dominik Scherrer
- Composer: Dominik Scherrer
- Country of origin: United Kingdom
- Original language: English
- No. of series: 1
- No. of episodes: 4 (list of episodes)

Production
- Producers: Christopher Aird; Colin Wratten
- Cinematography: Adam Etherington
- Editors: Emma Oxley; Robin Hill
- Running time: 60 minutes
- Production companies: Two Brothers Pictures; BBC Scotland

Original release
- Network: BBC One
- Release: 23 August – 13 September 2016

One of Us is a British drama television miniseries created and written by Harry and Jack Williams for the BBC. Originally titled Retribution, the series received the highest number of nominations for any television production at the 2017 Scottish Royal Television Society Awards, and actress Juliet Stevenson received a Scottish BAFTA nomination for her work on the show. It was released internationally in 2018 on Netflix, but was removed in January 2022.

== Plot ==
The story starts with childhood sweethearts Adam Elliot and Grace Douglas, who have married and are found brutally murdered after having returned home from their honeymoon. Their families and neighbours in the remote Scottish Highland village of Braeston are devastated. Events take an even darker turn when a badly injured man arrives at their doorstep after his car goes off the road – a man who seems to be the killer.

== Cast ==
- Juliet Stevenson as Louise Elliot
- Joanna Vanderham as Claire Elliot
- Laura Fraser as DI Juliet Wallace
- Joe Dempsie as Rob Elliot
- John Lynch as Bill Douglas
- Georgina Campbell as Anna
- Julie Graham as Moira Douglas
- Cristian Ortega as Jamie Douglas
- Louie O'Raw as (5-year-old) Adam Elliot
- Maisie O'Raw as (5-year-old) Grace Douglas
- Jeremy Neumark Jones as (adult) Adam Elliot
- Kate Bracken as (adult) Grace Douglas
- Owen Whitelaw as Lee Walsh
- Steve Evets as DS Andrew Barker
- Gary Lewis as Alastair
- Adrian Edmondson as Peter Elliot
- Kate Dickie as Sal
- Kae Alexander as Yuki
- Stuart Dutton (Police Sergeant)

== Episode list ==
| No. in series | Title | Directed by | Written by | Original release date | UK viewers (millions) |
|---|---|---|---|---|---|
| 1 | "The Storm" | William McGregor | Harry and Jack Williams | 23 August 2016 | 6.91 |
A horrific double murder shocks two families living in isolated rural Scotland. In the aftermath of the tragedy, they are faced with a terrible dilemma when the murderer arrives on their doorstep one stormy night. His fate lies in their hands - will they show mercy or get their revenge?
| 2 | "Beneath the Surface" | William McGregor | Harry and Jack Williams | 30 August 2016 | 5.79 |
The Douglas and Elliot families are faced with another dilemma when the police arrive to begin their investigation into the murder of Adam and Grace. Juliet's actions have unexpectedly tragic consequences.
| 3 | "Glenarvon Loch" | William McGregor | Harry and Jack Williams | 6 September 2016 | 5.51 |
Secrets and lies begin to unravel as Jamie makes a fateful decision and Rob must decide whom to protect. The police are closing in on the two families, but Juliet's own crimes are coming home to roost.
| 4 | "Adam and Grace" | William McGregor | Harry and Jack Williams | 13 September 2016 | 5.31 |
With Rob in jail, Claire is still desperately hunting for answers. Could Adam and Grace's wedding video hold the key to the mystery? When she makes a shocking discovery, the truth is more terrible than she could ever have imagined and will change all of their lives.

== Reception ==
Critical reception of the first episode was positive, with Joni Blyth of The Evening Standard describing it as "Tarantino-meets-Shakespeare. . . . A mash-up of Romeo and Juliet and The Hateful Eight, with the plight of young lovers bringing conflict between two families, who are trapped together with a killer during a storm. Whether it ends in Tarantino-like carnage remains to be seen". Ben Dowell of the Radio Times praised the opening episode as "a clever, chilling and original thriller" and "a strong opener to what promises to be a gripping four-part series". Dowell praised the acting as "first rate, even if a lot of the acting requires rather a lot of frenetic emoting as this horror story unfolds". The series also was praised for its tone and style, with Phill Fisk of The Guardian calling it "a grim, gloomy thriller with a latent moral edge".
