= Hal Yorke =

Fictional vampire character from the TV series Being Human

- Being Human character
- Damien Molony as Hal Yorke in Being Human
- First appearance: "Eve of the War" (2012)
- Last appearance: "The Last Broadcast" (2013)
- Created by: Toby Whithouse
- Portrayed by: Damien Molony

In-universe information
- Species: Vampire
- Gender: Male
- Status: Alive

Hal Yorke (also Lord Harry (Note: Fergus mentioned this name in the episode The Graveyard Shift (Fergus: "Oh he didn't mention it, did he? Our Lord Harry. He's an Old One. At least he was. Pretty high up.")) or Henry Yorke (Note: In 1950 Hal introduced himself as Henry Yorke towards Rachel Cutler (Nick Cutler's wife) in the episode Making History (Hal: "My name is Henry Yorke, I'm a colleague of your husband's"))) is a fictional vampire in the comedy-drama TV series Being Human, portrayed by Damien Molony. The male lead for the duration of the show's last two series appeared in 14 episodes of the drama.

== Television series ==
=== Background ===
Within the series narrative, Hal serves as a soldier in the Battle of Orsha on 8 September 1514, when he is turned into a vampire by an army surgeon. In his early years as a vampire Hal is one of the most evil vampires in existence and is tearing through Eastern Europe and its historic wars in the 1700s and 1800s. Hal is a member of Old Ones, a group of ancient and royal vampires. In the early 20th century Hal joins forces with the werewolf Lady Cathrine, and the ghost Emil, to defeat the devil, who benefits from the war between vampires and werewolves. Instead of using his own blood for the ritual, Hal sacrifices one of his men. Therefore, the trio is incomplete and instead of being defeated the devil is only weakened and escapes in the vessel of a mad man. In the 1950s Hal is starting to get tired of the killing and the way he has lived during the last decades. Hal hosts some werewolf fights where he meets the werewolf Leo who has never lost a fight and is very taken by him. He saves his werewolf friend, who in return helps him keep him off blood for the following five-and-a-half decades. Hal develops some techniques that help him to stay clean and keep his bloodlust at bay. So he plays dominoes, does exercises and press-ups.

=== Series 4 ===
At the beginning of the series Hal lives in a barbershop in South End, together with Leo, a werewolf, and Pearl, a ghost. Together the friends come to Barry to save Leo's life. However, Hal ends up alone and decides to stay with the ghost Annie and the werewolf Tom. While Hal considers Annie as a friend, Tom and Hal don't really get on at first but their friendship develops during the series. Hal is trying to block out his past and tries to remain clean from blood. He is afraid of any kind of human contact because it might trigger his bloodlust. However, living in the house with Annie and Tom he has to face the world outside, which he has avoided for the last decades. He starts working within a cafe along with Tom, which is very hard for him because there are always human customers. Furthermore, the Old Ones, who have been hiding in South America for last centuries are returning to the United Kingdom and plan to take over the world. When the Old Ones arrive at Barry Hal needs to decide whether he wants to try to fight them off or if he wants to join them. Hal and Tom finally make plan to sacrifice themselves in their fight against the Old Ones. However, in the end it is Annie who sacrifices herself and Eve and finally defeats the Old Ones.

=== Series 5 ===
Hal starts to work in the management of the Barry Hotel. Being more than 500 years old Hal finds it easy to adapt to situations while his friend Tom grew up in the woods and hasn't a lot of experiences. Tom gets jealous. The devil, who appears as a guest in the hotel, tries to egg the friends on, to argue with each other because he feeds on the conflict between vampires and werewolves. It works very well and the friends start to fight. Furthermore, new friends and enemies remind Hal of his own dark side. He tries to keep them at a distance. However, Hal finally gives into that dark side again. He starts to kill and drink human blood. When he realises that the devil instigated the fight between him and Tom it is already too late. However, when the devil rises Hal still joins forces with his friends to defeat him. The trio are sent into different dream worlds by the devil, but figure out quickly that these worlds are not real. Finally the friends seem to have defeated the devil and because of it they have turned human again. However, a DVD extra reveals that they are just in another dream world created by the devil. They figure it out and decide to face the devil again - to save their world.

== Relationships ==
=== Alex Millar ===
According to Kate Bracken Hal and Alex become close mates throughout the series. However, Damien Molony adds that Alex also represents the bad in Hal that he has been running from. On one hand he fancies her on the other hand their meeting up is the reason for the death of Alex and for her to become a ghost. So he feels responsible for this which is also painful for him. Because Hal is reminded of his bad side Hal finds it easier to push her away in order to cope with his guilt of what he’s done to her. Kate Bracken adds that Alex sees her relationship with Hal as complicated. She realises how hard it is for Hal to resist his bloodlust. She knows that it is like an illness which he can not control. So she is quite forgiving, but for her it is a battle of emotions when it comes to Hal.

=== Annie Sawyer ===
According to Damien Molony Hal looks up to Annie. He relies on her and needs her help to stay clean. She is a friend to him.

=== Tom McNair ===
According to Michael Socha and Damien Molony Hal and Tom hate each other at the beginning. Tom is afraid that the vampires are coming and that Hal might be one of them. However, they start to get closer to each other and finally they even ask each other for help and advice. They become friends.

== Casting ==
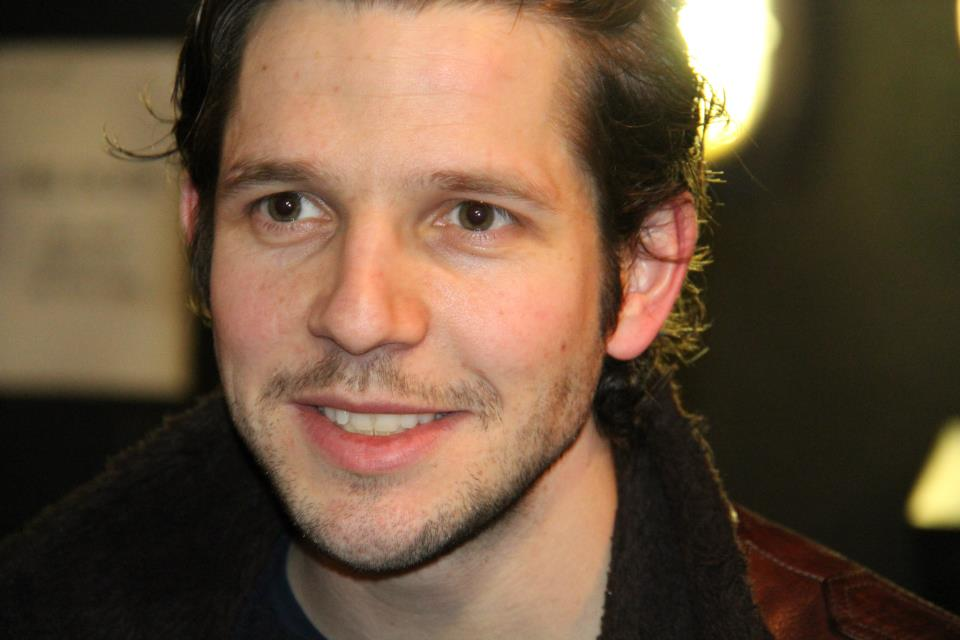
Damien Molony plays Hal Yorke.

After the departure of Aidan Turner (Mitchell), Russell Tovey (George) and Sinead Keenan (Nina), the producers of Being Human decided not to cancel the series but to renew it. Damien Molony did a drama showcase in February 2011 when the casting director of Being Human made a visit. She offered Molony to read for the part of Hal. At the recall Molony first met Michael Socha. They both got along and three days later Molony got a call from his agent and was told that he got the part. Molony moved to Cardiff the following week and stayed there for the next six months to do costume fittings, rehearsals and the filming of Being Human. In October 2011 it was announced to the public that Damien Moloney was cast as the vampire Hal. Before the new series was shown on television, a short online prequel with Hal was released in early January 2012. The prequel introduced the character to the Being Human fans and showed a bit of his background story. For Molony playing Hal was his first TV role. He had to learn how to work in front of the camera and was supported by the crew and his co-stars. Every evening he practised playing the vampire in his apartment. At first, he felt a big pressure, replacing former actor Aidan Turner and his character Mitchell, but then he realised, that Hal was completely different to Mitchell and had another background story. He said that it was nice to have been given the chance to play a completely different character. Before playing the role of Hal Damien Molony has researched on the Russian and Eastern European history and tried to find out where Hal might have been. For the prequel he wanted to find more information about Orsha, because Hal has been turned into a vampire during the Battle of Orsha. Molony thought that the bloodlust of vampires is similar to addicts. To understand Hal's bloodlust Molony did a lot of research on drug addicts and alcoholics and rehab and falling off the wagon, which helped him to get into Hal's world. Furthermore, Molony started to watch as much classic vampire films as he could. Films within the Bram Stoker, Nosferatu era helped him to play the vampire Hal, who doesn’t really know how to live a modern life.

== Characterisation ==
Within the series narrative, Hal is an OCD-afflicted blood-abstaining vampire. The producers mentioned that Hal would be very different from Being Humans previous lead vampire Mitchell. Damien Molony described his character Hal as "Very, very posh. Very upper class. A stiff upper-lipped Brit". According to Molony Hal's biggest challenge is blood and trying to keep away from blood. Hal is a very dangerous character who was, in his evil time, a legendary figure amongst the vampires. It is very difficult for Hal to have a relationship with a woman, as sex and bloodlust are linked. Molony thinks that during his dry 50 years Hal has been avoiding any kind of intimacy. In the series he has to face all these temptations, because he suddenly finds himself within the modern world. According to Molony, Hal can be quite calm, quite contained and live a very basic life for several decades, but then he suddenly turn into his former self and be aggressive, rape, torture and kill everything he sees. Similar to Jekyll & Hyde, but within a single blink of his black, vampire eyes. Lenora Crichlow mentioned that Damien Molony brought "a whole different intensity to the vampire". She said that Hal is intelligent and wise similar to Mitchell, but in a very different way. She added that Hal's wisdom comes from managing his bloodlust and that his intensity comes from his discipline. Loma Jowett compares Hal to Angel from Buffy the Vampire Slayer. Similar to Angel/Angelus Hal has a split personality "with a bad side that eventually comes forward however hard Hal tries to repress him"

== Reception ==
After the broadcast of Hal's prequel Keith Watson from Metro said that Being Human has "promising signs of fresh life" and that the "chief among them is Damien Molony's vampire Hal". When the first episode of series four was released on television the reactions to the new leads and the new series were already very positive. According to Mark Oakley from Den of Geek Damien Molony "delivers every line with a gravitas that lights up any scene he’s part of." He adds that it was a pleasure to listen to his speeches. Mandy from The Media Addict enjoyed getting to know Hal. She loves Hal’s whole stiff and proper old English gentleman act and adds that she adores Damien Molony as Hal and thinks he is gorgeous. Ian Berriman from GamesRadar thinks that Hal falling off the wagon in the end of series five is horrible to see and Damien Molony’s performance is "perfection itself". Malcolm Stewart from the Cultbox believes that Hal's and Tom's double act is one of the highlights of the show. Morgan Jeffrey from Digital Spy adds that the characters are fantastic individually, but are unbeatable when they are together. He mentioned that television critics as well as Being Human fans, were sceptical that anyone could fill the "charisma void left by Aidan Turner, but Molony slotted in seamlessly". According to Aubry D'Arminio from Entertainment Weekly Hal has his own charms. He has sensitivity to Annie’s pain, is loyal to Leo and has a very pretty face. Mark Oakley from Den of Geek says that he had loved watching Hal evolve as the series had evolved with him. George Ivanoff thinks that Hal is "a much more interesting and complex vampire than Mitchell".

In February 2012 Damien Molony was featured along with Michael Socha on Glamour's TV's Hottest New Stars list, which contained eight new stars. Hal was described as sexy.

== See also ==
- List of fictional vampires
