= Harrick =

Harrick is a surname. Notable people with the surname include:

- Jim Harrick (born 1938), American basketball coach
- Steve Harrick (1897–1988), American football, baseball, and wrestling coach

== See also ==
- Garrick (name)
- Herrick (surname)
