= William Herrick =

William Herrick is the name of:

- William Herrick (MP) (1562–1653), English jeweller, courtier, diplomat and politician
- William Herrick (novelist) (1915–2004), American novelist
- William Herrick (Being Human), a character in the British supernatural drama-comedy television series Being Human
