= John Herrick =

John Herrick may refer to:

- John Herrick (footballer) (1946–2025), Irish football player and manager
- John Herrick (writer), American novelist and nonfiction author
- John J. Herrick (1920–1997), United States Navy officer
