= Samuel Herrick =

Samuel Herrick may refer to:

- Samuel Herrick (politician) (1779–1852), U.S. Representative from Ohio
- Samuel Herrick (astronomer) (1911–1974), American astronomer
