= Robert Herrick =

Robert Herrick may refer to:

- Robert Herrick (novelist) (1868–1938), American novelist
- Robert Herrick (poet) (1591–1674), English poet
