= Alex Millar (Being Human) =

Fictional character from the British TV series Being Human

- Being Human character
- First appearance: "Puppy Love" (2012)
- Last appearance: "The Last Broadcast" (2013)
- Created by: Toby Whithouse
- Portrayed by: Kate Bracken

In-universe information
- Species: Ghost
- Gender: Female
- Full name: Alexandra Millar
- Status: Alive

Alexandra Millar (Note: The name Alexandra is mentioned Being Human Episode The Trinity in a newspaper article about Alex's death. ("The funeral of Alexandra Millar took place yesterday.")) is a fictional character in the comedy-drama TV series Being Human, portrayed by Kate Bracken. Alex Millar started as a recurring character in the fourth series of the show and became a lead character in the fifth series of the show.

== Television series ==
=== Series 4 ===
Alex is on holiday with her father and brothers when she meets the vampire Hal in a cafe. The two of them start dating. For Hal, it is his first date in over fifty years. A short time later, Alex is killed by the vampire Cutler. Cutler wants to take revenge on what Hal did to him in his past. So he tricks Hal into drinking her blood. Meanwhile, Alex returns as a ghost. She joins Hal and his friends, the werewolf Tom and the ghost Annie to bring down Cutler and the Old Ones, one of the most ancient vampires. However, in the end it is Annie who sacrifices herself and Eve and finally defeats them. Alex moves into the house of Tom and Hal.

=== Series 5 ===
Alex still needs to come to terms with what being killed and returning as a ghost actually means for her. Until then she didn’t really get the time to think about this. Now she needs to cope with not being able to do the things any more that she used to do as a human. It is hard for her to realise that no human, including her family, can see her any more. Furthermore, her family doesn’t even know what has happened to her. She has to cope with the grief of losing her family. So she tries to create a new family with Hal and Tom and takes care of the two of them. Alex also wants to find out what her unfinished business on Earth is and why she returned as a ghost. Meanwhile, Hal and Tom start to fight. This helps the devil, who feeds on the conflict between vampires and werewolves. When the devil rises the friends join forces to defeat the devil. The trio is sent into different dream worlds by the devil, but figures out very fast that these worlds are not real. Finally, the friends seem to have defeated the devil and because of it they have turned human again. However, a DVD extra reveals, that they are just in another dream world created by the devil. They figure it out and decide to face the devil again — to save their world.

== Relationships ==
=== Hal Yorke ===
According to Damien Molony Alex and Hal fancied each other and go onto a date only short time later Alex is murdered. Hal feels responsible for this and Alex reminds him of his monstrous side and his evil capabilities. So he sometimes tries to push her away, because he does not want to deal with the guilt of what he has done to her. Kate Bracken adds that for Alex their relationship is never easy, especially when Hal gives into his darker side too much. She tries to see past this but eventually gets to a point where she can’t deal with it any more. A huge part of her however is still not able to let go of Hal. Alex realises that it is such a big struggle for Hal to abstain from blood, that for him it is like an illness which he can not control. She is quite forgiving when it comes to Hal.

=== Tom McNair ===
According to Kate Bracken Alex tries to create a new family because she has lost her own family since returning as a ghost. She sees Tom as a brother and is always there for him. She also tries to teach him things like to be a bit cooler around girls.

=== Annie Sawyer ===
According to Robin Roberts Annie is like a "mother-mentor" to Alex. She teaches Alex things that Alex needs as a ghost like moving objects. Roberts also describes Annie's and Alex's relationship as a "ghostly sisterhood", similar to the one in Blithe Spirit.

=== Alex's family ===
According to Kate Bracken Alex is very close to her father Brendan and her three brothers Derek, Ryan and Decky (short for Declan). (Note: The names Derek, Ryan and Declan only appear in the Being Human episode "The Trinity" in a newspaper article about Alex's death. ("Alexandra is survived by her father Brendan and brothers Derek, Ryan and Declan.")) When she loses her family she grieves over them.

== Casting ==
Bracken got a call from her agent who told her that he had a meeting for her with the casting director, director and producer for the part of playing Alex in the TV series Being Human. By this time Bracken had planned to move from Scotland to London. However, she hadn’t done the big move yet. So she decided to move down earlier than she had planned to get to this audition. A week later she got a recall, but then she heard nothing for a long time. When she already thought that she didn’t get the part, she received a phone call and was told that she would be playing Alex. When Kate Bracken was cast as Alex it was only for three episodes. During the filming actress Kate Bracken heard some hints that her character might stay, but she did not think much more about it. Then production team asked Bracken to sign up for the next series, with Alex becoming a lead character. For Bracken, it was a pleasure to come back so she agreed.

== Characterisation ==
Alex is very straight-forward. She is very close to her father and brothers. However, she never mentions her mother. Her mother has left the family when Alex was a teenager. From that time on Alex took care of her three brothers. When she becomes a ghost she finds it hard to deal with her death and not being able to do the things that she used to do as a human. She is looking for any kind of sensation, for tastes and smells, but is sad when she figures out that she can’t have these any more. She also finds it very hard to leave her family behind, that she is so close with. However, Alex isn’t a person who dwells on things too much. So she tries to always think about how she can contribute and make things better. Having lost her family she tries to create a new family with Tom and Hal, helping them out whenever she can. Furthermore, Alex always sees the good in people, even if no one else can.

== Reception ==
Mark Oakley from Den of Geek believes that Kate Bracken has a great screen presence. He adds that Bracken's performances as Alex have been fantastic, providing her character with real grit and determination. Caroline Preece from Den of Geek thinks that Kate Bracken complements the already-established dynamic between Michael Socha and Damien Molony beautifully. According to her Alex is charming and ballsy and refreshing in her big difference from Annie’s character. According to Martyn from Badwilf.com Kate Bracken "is brilliant as Alex and is a million miles away from Annie." Nick Bryan from thedigitalfix.com liked that Alex is a "less whiny ghost" than Annie. Dan Martin from The Guardian enjoyed the arrival of Kate Bracken as Alex, as the "don't mess big-sister ghost figure". After she joined the series he doesn't even miss the former ghost Annie. According to the SFX magazine Kate Bracken is giving a "spirited performance" as Being Human's new ghost.

According to Candice Grace from tvequals.com Alex has "shaped up to be a great character" in series five. Alex showed a lot of initiative during the series — without her Tom and Hal would be completely lost in their fight against the devil. In 2013 Bracken got the 13th place on the Best breakthrough actor of 2013 list of the Radio Times, for her portrayal of Alex in Being Human.

== See also ==
- List of ghosts
