= Glenn W. Herrick =

American entomologist

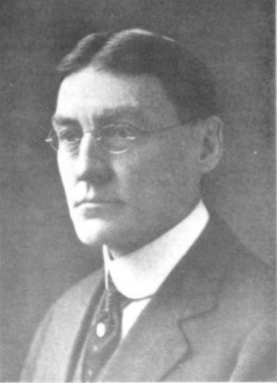
- Born: Glenn Washington Herrick; January 5, 1870; Otto, New York
- Died: February 12, 1965 (aged 95); Ithaca, New York
- Resting place: Lake View Cemetery
- Education: Cornell University
- Occupation: Entomologist
- Spouse: Nannie Young Burke (m. 1898; died 1957)
- Children: 3

Glenn Washington Herrick (January 5, 1870 – February 12, 1965) was an American professor of entomology who worked at Cornell University.

== Biography ==
Herrick was born near Otto, New York, where his parents Stephen M. and Marion Botsford Herrick ran a farm. After studying at the local schools he worked briefly as a school teacher before going to Fredonia, New York, and then graduating with a BSA from Cornell University in 1896. He then taught biology at the State College of Mississippi, Starkville, for twelve years before joining the Agricultural and Mechanical College of Texas, College Station, to teach entomology for a year. He then returned to Cornell University in 1909 in the entomology department and worked there until his retirement in 1935. Along with John Henry Comstock, he was the co-author for editions of Manual for the Study of Insects from 1930. Herrick was a second cousin of Anna Botsford Comstock on her father's side, and he edited her autobiography which was posthumously published in 1953. He also contributed entries to the Encyclopedia Britannica. He served as president of the American Association of Economic Entomologists in 1915.

He married Nannie Young Burke (d. 1957) in 1898, and they had a daughter and two sons. He also served as clerk of the vestry of St. John's Episcopal Church in Ithaca, and was insect merit badge counselor for the Boy Scouts of America chapter in Ithaca.

Glenn W. Herrick died at his home in Ithaca, New York on February 12, 1965. He was buried at Lake View Cemetery.
