= Richard Herrick =

First successful organ transplant recipient (1931–1963)

Richard J. Herrick (June 15, 1931 – March 14, 1963) was an American who gained worldwide recognition as the first beneficiary of a successful human organ transplant.

Herrick suffered from kidney disease. Under the direction of Joseph Murray, J. Hartwell Harrison, and John Merrill, Herrick underwent a groundbreaking surgical procedure. This operation, conducted on December 23, 1954, facilitated by the donation of a kidney from his identical twin brother Ronald, represented a significant advancement in medical science. Following the transplant, he experienced an extension of life by eight years until succumbing to a fatal heart attack at the age of 31.
