= Tom McNair =

Fictional werewolf

- Being Human character
- First appearance: "Lia" (2011)
- Last appearance: "The Last Broadcast" (2013)
- Created by: Toby Whithouse
- Portrayed by: Michael Socha
- Other portrayals: Rhodri Lewis (young Tom)

In-universe information
- Species: Werewolf
- Gender: Male
- Full name: Thomas McNair
- Status: Alive

Thomas "Tom" McNair is a fictional werewolf in the comedy-drama TV series Being Human, portrayed by Michael Socha. Tom McNair was a recurring character in the third series of the show and became a main character in the two last series of the show. He appeared in 18 episodes of the drama.

== Television series ==
=== Background ===
In the series narrative Tom's story starts with his adoptive father McNair. McNair is captured by a vampire named Herrick and is forced to take part in a "Dog Fight", a fight between a werewolf and a human, which is watched by vampires. McNair manages to kill a werewolf, but is infected and turned into werewolf himself. One day McNair is able to escape. He is angry about what the vampires did to him and tries to kill every vampire he comes across. One full moon night, a couple is outside with their baby son Tom, when the werewolf McNair comes across them he kills the parents and infects Tom. Waking up the next day, McNair realised what his werewolf self has done and is horrified. Feeling guilty for orphaning Tom, McNair adopts him. Tom doesn't know that McNair is not his father. He believes a story that McNair has told him since he was very young. McNair has told Tom that he was born a werewolf and that his mother had been killed by vampires. Tom grows up with McNair outside society and the two of them see their mission in killing vampires.

=== Series 3 ===
The 20-year-old werewolf Tom comes with his vampire-hunting dad McNair, to the house of Mitchell, Annie, George and Nina. He fancies Nina, but nothing ever happens between them since Nina is in love with George. When Tom finds out that he isn't McNair's son and that he has been lied to his whole life it makes him very angry, but eventually he forgives McNair. Finally, McNair is killed by the vampire Herrick. Tom discovers his adoptive father's body and buries him. He swears revenge and wants to kill the vampires responsible for it, but not only them even more vampires have to be killed.

=== Series 4 ===
After his dad McNair, later also George and Nina have died Tom has decided to stay with Annie and Eve (George and Nina's daughter). They are the only persons he is familiar with, apart from his dad. He also feels responsible for Eve and tries to take care for her and protect her. Tom meets the werewolf Allison and a romance develops between the two of them. Getting to know Tom's life, Allison soon starts to hunt vampires as well. In fear that his lifestyle is unsuitable for Allison Tom rejects her. Living together with the vampire Hal, Tom learns to be less judgemental towards some vampires. Along with Hal tries to fight off the Old Ones, ancient vampires who want to take over the world. However, in the end it is Annie who sacrifices herself and Eve and finally defeats them.

=== Series 5 ===
Tom and Hal start to work in a hotel in Barry. The owner sets up a new employee of the month competition. Tom grew up in the woods and hasn't a lot experiences, while Hal has hundreds of years of experience about how to deal with the upper society and with being a gentleman. Tom gets a little jealous of Hal. It doesn't help that the boss of the hotel treats Hal a lot better than Tom. The devil, who appears as a guest in the hotel, tries to egg the friends on, to argue with each other because he feeds on the conflict between vampires and werewolves. It works very well and the friends start to fight. The situation escalates when Tom finds out that Hal drinks the blood of his love interest Natasha, who is later killed by the devil. Tom thinks that Hal has killed Natasha and starts a fight with Hal. When Tom realises that the devil set up the fight between him and Hal it is already too late. However, when the devil rises the friends join forces to defeat the devil. The trio is sent into different dream worlds by the devil, but figures out very fast that these worlds are not real. Finally, the friends seem to have defeated the devil and because of it they have turned human again. However, a DVD extra reveals, that they are just in another dream world created by the devil. They figure it out and decide to face the devil again - to save their world.

== Relationships ==
=== Annie Sawyer ===
According to Michael Socha Annie is like a mother to Tom. Annie looks after Tom and takes care of him. She is the leader of the household and sets the rules. Tom also likes to help Annie with the baby Eve. He protects the child and looks after her.

=== Hal Yorke ===
According to Damien Molony Tom and Hal do not get along when they meet for the first time. Tom hates vampires and wants to kill them and Hal is one of them. As time passes Tom and Hal get to know each other and become closer to each other. Michael Socha adds that later they can be considered as best friends. However it is still difficult for Tom to deal with Hal as he never really knows when Hal is good and when he is bad.

=== Alex Millar ===
According to Michael Socha Tom sees Alex as part of his family and someone he would always go back to.

=== McNair ===
According to Michael Socha Tom trusted his adopted father completely and listened to his rules. Tom rarely disagreed with McNair. In general he obeyed his rules and did what McNair said.

=== Allison ===
According to Toby Whithouse Werewolf Allison is Tom's first love. Michael Socha adds that Tom does feel that he likes her but since he didn't have a similar experience before he doesn't really know how to interpret and cope with his feelings. However, in the end Tom rejects Allison, fearing that his lifestyle might be unsuitable for Allison, says Caroline Preece from Den of Geek.

== Casting and Development ==
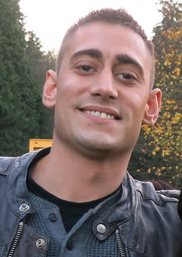
Michael Socha played Tom

When the creators introduced Tom as a recurring character, they were already suspecting, that Russell Tovey (George Sands) would leave the series at some point. Being Human was a show with a low budget and people responsible for other, bigger productions would notice the actors. They wanted to prepare themselves for the inevitability of Tovey leaving the series. Introducing another werewolf character before Tovey thought of leaving the show would help to move that character in. When Tovey actually left the show the production team decided that Tom should be one of the main characters in the new series, taking over Russell's role. It helped that the dynamic between Socha, Crichlow (Annie Sawyer) and Molony (Hal Yorke) was good. At first When Socha got the main role he was nervous about being compared to his predecessor Russell Tovey. It helped that Tom was a completely different character from Tovey's George. In an interview with Young Hollywood at 21 November 2013 Socha said that playing Tom was a challenge for him because Tom is very different from himself, but he really enjoyed it. For Socha, it was his favourite role to play.

== Characterisation ==
Creator Toby Whithouse said that Tom has a "kind of brutality and physicality" that the previous werewolf character of George never had. According to him Tom has "no recollection of being anything other than a werewolf" that is why he is "completely immersed in the supernatural world". After growing up in the woods with his only company being his father McNair, Tom is desperate to meet other people and wants to get some new friends. He also wants to get to know another life besides only being in the woods. So far he has not seen much of the world and wants to get to know more about it. Throughout the series Tom is growing up. Without his father he learns to be more responsible for himself and others. Tom is very old- fashioned in his approach to women. Tom doesn't have a clue about civilisation and society. He is very innocent and never had a girlfriend, but wants to get to know a girl. Tom is funny and naive, but can also be aggressive and angry.

== Reception ==
When the main cast members of Being Human left the series after season three, critics and fans were sceptical that the new cast could lift up to their predecessors. However, the reactions to the new cast were overwhelmingly positive. Radio Times says that Tom "really is like a large puppy". The magazine describes him as "very funny", "fierce, loyal and looking to be loved." Matt Roush from TV Guide describes Tom as "amusing if often unintelligible". Mark Oakley from Den of Geek thinks that Michael Socha's Tom "consistently delights". The pair of Socha and Damien Molony (Hal) riff well together, delivering the comic interludes as well as the serious drama. According to Aubry D'Arminio from Entertainment Weekly Tom is one of Being Human's “only honest-to-goodness kindhearted supernaturals.” Dan Martin from The Guardian praises Sochas performance as Tom. According to him it proved "the original Being Human flatmate template was durable and, better still, restored the early special brand of tender humour". Caroline Preece from Den of Geek thinks that Tom's recurring appearances in the third series were a highlight. “The image of him cradling McNair’s body and reading his last wishes was truly heartbreaking” and she understands why the producers wanted to keep the character.

== See also ==
- List of fictional werewolves
