= Francis Hobart Herrick =

American writer and illustrator

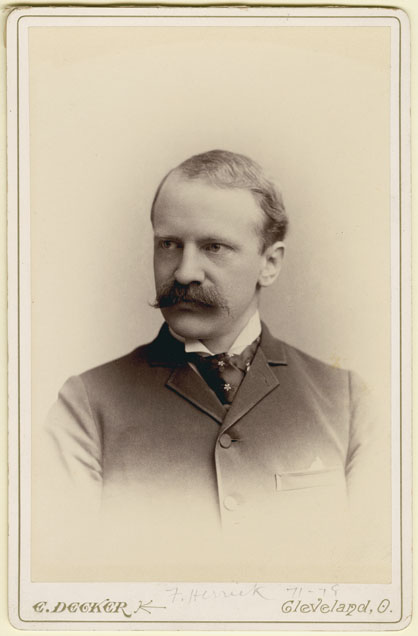
Francis Hobart Herrick in the 1870s

Francis Hobart Herrick (19 November 1858, in Woodstock, Vermont – 11 September 1940, in Cleveland, Ohio) was an American writer, natural history illustrator and founding professor of biology at Adelbert College of Western Reserve University. He wrote a two-volume biography of Audubon and several popular books on the life of birds.

== Life and work ==
Francis Hobart Herrick was the son of Marcellus Aurelius Herrick and Hannah Andrews Putnam. Herrick attended St. Paul's School in Concord, New Hampshire from where he went to Dartmouth College in 1881. His Ph.D. was obtained at Johns Hopkins University in 1888. The embryology and biology of shellfish, especially lobster, became a consuming interest.

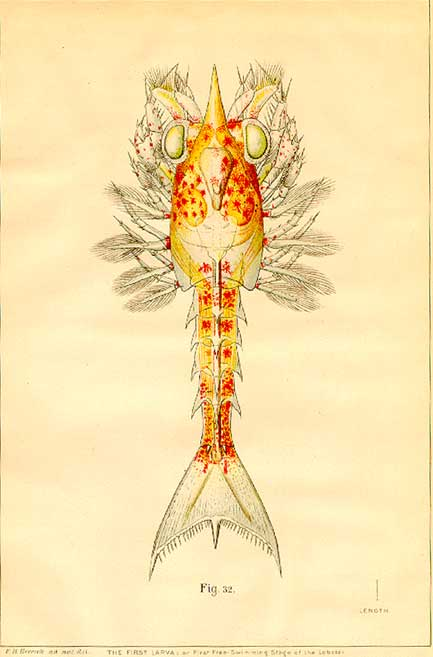
Plate from The American Lobster: A study of its habits and development

He was approached in 1890 by the United States Commissioner of Fisheries to research and publish a comprehensive report on the American Lobster. Over a period of five years Herrick studied lobsters along the seaboards of Massachusetts, Maine and New Hampshire working from a laboratory at Woods Hole, Massachusetts. The finished work was entitled The American Lobster: A study of its habits and development and appeared in volume 15 of the Bulletin of the United States Fish Commission for 1895. This definitive work includes some 100 detailed drawings of Homarus americanus. Herrick was greatly concerned about the unregulated lobster-fishing industry and that the limited migration of lobsters bedevils recovery of lobster populations once depleted.

His 1917 work was the first critical biography of John James Audubon and negated the public's romanticised image of him as an American woodsman. An ornithologist with a particular interest in the aetiology of instinct in wild birds, Herrick was the first researcher to study the bald eagle in the field, and help popularise wildlife photography in the process. He became professor emeritus in 1929.

== Personal life ==
Herrick married on June 24, 1897, to Josephine (February 4, 1860 in Cleveland, Ohio – August 30, 1952 in Alameda, California) the daughter of John Herkomer and Agnes Koenig. They had two children Agnes E. Herrick (1898–1992) and Francis Herkomer Herrick (1900–1996).

== Publications ==
- Biology, a sketch of its history (1891)
- Audubon the Naturalist: A History of His Life and Time, New York, D. Appleton-Century Company, 1917. ISBN 140978455X (In two volumes, Volume 1 Volume 2)
  - Audubon the Naturalist (second edition in a single volume, 1938)
- Wild Birds at Home. New York, D. Appleton-Century Company, 1935.
- The American Lobster: A Study of its Habits and Development. Washington, Bulletin of the U.S. Fish Commission, 1895.
  - Natural history of the American lobster (1911)
- The American Eagle: A study in natural and civil history, New York, D. Appleton-Century Company, 1934.
- The home life of wild birds : a new method of the study and photography of birds. New York, G.P. Putnam, 1901 (Alternate)
