= James Herrick =

James Herrick may refer to:

- James A. Herrick (born 1954), American professor of communication
- James B. Herrick (1861–1954), American doctor
- Jim Herrick (1944–2023), British humanist and secularist

== See also ==
- Jim Harrick (born 1938), American basketball coach
