= Thomas Herrick =

American politician

Member Virginia House of Burgesses
- In office 1629–1630

Personal details
- Occupation: Planter, politician

Thomas Herrick, sometimes spelled Thomas Hayrick or Thomas Heyrick or Thomas Heyricke was a member of the Virginia House of Burgesses, the elected lower house of the colonial Virginia General Assembly, from the "Upper Part of" Elizabeth City, Virginia, later Elizabeth City County, Virginia, now Hampton, Virginia, in 1629–1630.

In a note in the Richmond Standard quoted in other sources, Henry Herrick, burgess for Warwick County, Virginia in 1644–1645, is said to be a nephew of Thomas Herrick.

On March 24, 1630, Herrick and six other burgesses were ordered by Act II of the assembly of 1629–1630 to inspect the site for a fort at Old Point Comfort at the extreme tip of the Virginia Peninsula at Hampton Roads and to agree with Captain Samuel Mathews for the building of the fort.
