= Henry Herrick =

American politician

Member Virginia House of Burgesses
- In office 1644–1645

Personal details
- Born: 1604 Loughborough, Leicestershire, England
- Died: Unknown
- Occupation: Planter, Politician

Coat of Arms of Henry Herrick

Henry Herrick, sometimes spelled Henry Hayrick or Henry Heyrick or Henry Heyricke was a member of the Virginia House of Burgesses, the elected lower house of the colonial Virginia General Assembly, from Warwick County, in 1644 and 1644–1645.

In a note in the Richmond Standard quoted in other sources, Henry Herrick is said to be a nephew of Thomas Herrick, burgess for "The Upper Part of" Elizabeth City, Virginia, later Elizabeth City County, Virginia, now Hampton, Virginia, in 1629–1630.

He was the son of William Herrick (MP) and his wife, Joan, daughter of Richard May of London and his wife, Mary Hilderson of Devonshire.
