= Kate Bracken =

Scottish actress

- Born: 12 June 1990 (age 36); Scotland
- Education: Motherwell College
- Occupation: Actress
- Years active: 2011–present
- Known for: Being Human & Misfits

Kate Bracken (born 12 June 1990) is a Scottish actress. Bracken is best known for her role as Alex Millar in Being Human, and Iona in 2018 British thriller Calibre.

== Early life ==
Bracken grew up just outside Fort William near the village of Spean Bridge. She attended Kilmonivaig Primary School before attending Lochaber High School. After graduating from Telford College, Edinburgh she went to Motherwell College, where she obtained an acting degree in 2011. She then met with casting directors, found representation from an agent, and moved to London.

== Career ==
Bracken got her first acting television role when she made an appearance in Inspector George Gently in 2011, playing the character Hazel. In 2012 she was cast as a recurring character Alex Millar in the fourth series of British supernatural drama Being Human. Bracken appeared as Mia in an episode of New Tricks, before returning in the fifth series of Being Human as a series regular in early 2013, replacing Lenora Crichlow as the new ghostly character. Later in 2013, Bracken also appeared in series 5 of the hit television show Misfits as Karen, who has the power of camouflage.

In 2016 Bracken starred in Max McGill's short film Hot Property. In the same year she appeared as Grace in the BBC mini series One of Us.

In 2018 Bracken played the leading female role, Iona, in acclaimed British thriller Calibre.

== Filmography ==
Short film
Year	Title	Role	Notes
2014	Edit	Jenny	Short film

Film
Year	Title	Role	Notes
2014	How Do I Get Up There?		
2016	Moon Dogs	Suzy	
2016	Hot Property	Laurie Mills	
2018	Calibre	Iona	

Television
Year	Title	Role	Notes
2011	Inspector George Gently	Hazel Holdaway	Episode: "Gently Upside Down"
2012	New Tricks	Mia Adler	Episode: "Blue Flower"
2012–2013	Being Human	Alex Millar	9 episodes
2013	Rubenesque	Shirelle	TV movie
2013	Misfits	Karen	3 episodes
2014	DCI Banks	Alice Craig	Episodes: Bad Boy: Parts 1 & 2
2014	Holby City	Mia	Episode: "Affair of the Mind"
2015	Doctors	Lara Parker	Episode: "Bad Samaritan"
2016	Reg	L/Corporal Joanne Richardson	TV movie
2016	One of Us	Grace Douglas	Mini-series, 4 episodes
2020	Trigonometry	Esther	Mini-series, 3 episodes
2020	Killing Eve	Dr Greer Barrie	Episodes: "Beautiful Monster" & "Are You Leading or Am I?"
2020	Soulmates	Tyra	Episode: "Little Adventures"
2021	Whitstable Pearl	Alice Lowry	Episode: "Disappearance at Oare"
2021	Shetland	Lynda Morton	3 episodes
2023	Silent Witness	Lucy Stevens	Series 26, Episodes 3&4 (Familiar Faces)
2024	Father Brown	Ella Blackthorn	Episode: "The Word of the Condemned"
2024	Granite Harbour	Katie Forsyth	
