= Nina Pickering =

Fictional character from the British TV series Being Human

- Being Human character
- First appearance: "Tully" (2009)
- Last appearance: "The Wolf-Shaped Bullet" (2011)
- Created by: Toby Whithouse
- Portrayed by: Sinéad Keenan

In-universe information
- Species: Werewolf
- Gender: Female
- Status: Deceased

Nina Pickering is a fictional character in the comedy-drama TV series Being Human, portrayed by Sinéad Keenan. Nina Pickering was a recurring character in the first two series of the show and a main character in the third series of the show. She appeared in 19 episodes of the drama.

== Television series ==
=== Series 1 ===
Nina was working as a nurse in a hospital when she met co-worker George, who was a werewolf. They started to date. Some time later, Nina realised that her boyfriend George and his friend and co-worker Mitchell had a secret. She followed them into a cellar where George transformed into a werewolf, planning to kill the evil vampire Herrick once and for all. When George killed Herrick, he accidentally scratched Nina during his transformation.

=== Series 2 ===
George's scratch turned Nina into a werewolf. Nina struggled to cope with her condition, as well as seeing George kill Herrick. Annie was the first person Nina turned to when she learned that she had become a werewolf. Annie helped Nina during her first transformation and stayed with her the first night, providing her with a coat.

As Nina could not cope with being a werewolf; she left George and joined CenSSA, an organisation that promised to get rid of her condition once and for all. She told George about the opportunity. At first George was doubtful, but when a series of unfortunate events lead to some negative consequences in his life he decided to join Nina in going to CenSSA along with Annie to finally cure his lycanthropy. George, Annie and Nina eventually figure out that the organisation couldn't keep its promises and that a lot of werewolves were killed during experiments. The trio managed to escape, but it was too late for Annie. She was sent to hell by the leader of the organisation, Kemp. Later George, Mitchell and Nina move into a new home in Barry.

=== Series 3 ===
Nina and George are finally back together and are living in the same house with Mitchell who saves Annie from purgatory. Annie is moving into the new house. Nina and George get on very well and soon Nina becomes pregnant. Nina worries about her baby. She wonders if she and her baby will survive the monthly transformations. However, in the end everything goes well and the child survives.

=== Series 4 ===
Nina's death happened between series three and four. In series four, the audience learns that Nina has been beaten to death by vampires, only a few days after her daughter Eve is born. Soon George also dies, sacrificing his life for his daughter by triggering a werewolf transformation without the influence of the moon, his last words being to entrust Eve to Annie.

At the end of the series Nina is joined by her friends Annie, Mitchell, George and baby Eve in the afterlife. A reunion scene with the friends is never shown on television.

== Relationships ==
=== George Sands ===
Lenora Crichlow believes that George and Nina support each other a lot. Nina often pulls George back so that they both stay close to humanity and their true selves. Furthermore, Nina always listens when George says something and is looking after him.

=== Annie Sawyer ===
Lenora Crichlow says that when Nina gets to know that she has become a werewolf, Annie is the first person she turns to. Annie helps Nina through her transformation and provides her with a coat which is covering her when she wakes up.

== Casting and development ==
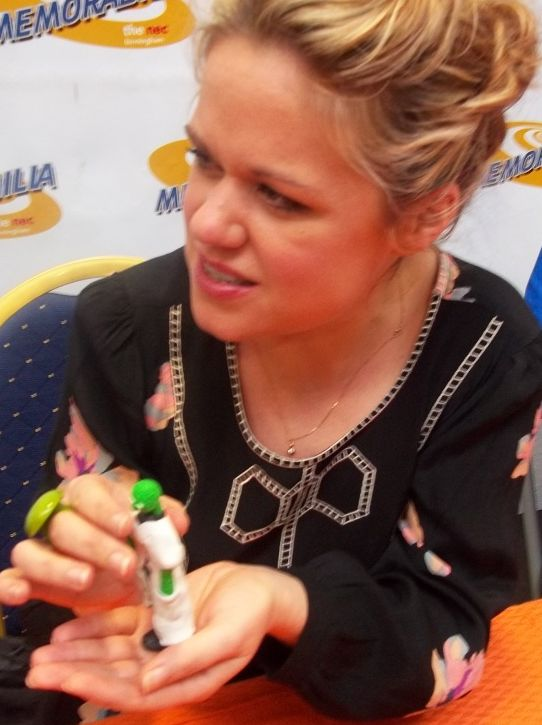
Sinead Keenan played Nina

Sinead Keenan got told by her agent told her she would be auditioning for a show about a werewolf, a ghost and a vampire. She then auditioned for the show and got the role of Nina. The first plan for Sinead Keenan's character Nina was to be written out of the series at the end of season one. When creator Toby Whithouse saw Keenan's and Tovey's great dynamic on set while filming he decided that the character Nina should stay. Since the producers enjoyed the relationship between Nina and George very much they decided that Keenan should become a series regular within the third season. Nina remained in the series for another year until Keenan decided to leave the series.

== Leaving the series ==
In January 2012 Sinead Keenan announced on Twitter that she would not return to Being Human. She said that she had a heavy heart but also felt a little relief. For her it was a difficult decision, after having three wonderful years and one of her best in her acting career. She also said that her departure would happen off-screen since she hasn't filmed anything for series four.

== Characterisation ==
Nina is a headstrong woman in her mid twenties. Nina is tough and has her own physical and emotional baggage to deal with. During her childhood Nina has been beaten up by her mother. She wonders if she can be a good mother herself. Nina works as a Senior Staff nurse in the hospital in Bristol.

== Reception ==
Mark Oakley from Den of Geek thought that Keenan had a "rather thankless role in Doctor Who", however he thinks that Keenan is much better in Being Human, lending a bit of weight to the character of Nina, who is going to have a larger role to play“ in series two. According to The Daily Telegraph Nina’s relationship with George was perceived very well by fans and critics. Matt Risley from IGN thinks that Sinead Keenan and Russell Tovey "bring an intimacy and humanity" to Nina's and George's relationship that "effortlessly straddles the line between horror, comedy and drama". Matt Wales from IGN praises Sinead Keenan's "mesmerizingly broken performance as Nina" when the werewolf-in-waiting tries to deal with her new nature.

== See also ==
- List of fictional werewolves
