= Herrick Bowley =

English cricketer

Herrick Browett Bowley (10 January 1911 – 1 December 1991) was an English cricketer active from 1931 to 1937 who played for Leicestershire. He was born in Kirby-Muxloe and died in Leicester. He appeared in thirteen first-class matches as a righthanded batsman who bowled leg breaks. He scored 113 runs with a highest score of 25 and took 17 wickets with a best performance of four for 17.
