= George Herrick =

Court official during the Salem Witch Trials

George Herrick (c. 1658–1695) was the "Marshal" for the Court of Oyer and Terminer during the Salem Witch Trials.

Herrick described himself as "bred a gentleman, and not much used to work". He was described by those who knew him as a "very tall, handsome man, very regular and devout in his attendance at church, religious without bigotry, and having every man's good word." In several of the witch cases, Herrick is listed as a plaintiff. He presented the court with his own petition on December 8, 1692, begging the magistrates to pay him "overtime" wages for the hard work he had done during the trials.
