= List of Humans episodes =

Humans is a science fiction television series that debuted on 14 June 2015 on Channel 4. Created by the British team Jonathan Brackley and Sam Vincent, based on the Swedish science fiction drama Real Humans, the series explores the themes of artificial intelligence and robotics, focusing on the social, cultural, and psychological impact of the invention of anthropomorphic robots called "synths". The series is produced jointly by AMC in the United States, and Channel 4 and Kudos in Britain.

Channel 4 announced in May 2019 that there would not be a fourth series. During the course of the programme, 24 episodes of Humans aired over three series.

== Series overview ==
Series	Episodes	Originally released (UK)		Avg. UK viewers (millions)	Avg. US viewers (millions)
Series	Episodes	First released	Last released	Avg. UK viewers (millions)	Avg. US viewers (millions)
1	8	14 June 2015	2 August 2015	4.12	1.18
2	8	30 October 2016	18 December 2016	1.93	0.47
3	8	17 May 2018	5 July 2018	1.05	0.35

== Episodes ==
=== Season 1 (2015) ===
No. overall	Episode	Directed by	Written by	Original release date	Viewers (millions)
1	Episode 1	Sam Donovan	Sam Vincent & Jonathan Brackley	14 June 2015 (UK)	5.47 (UK)
1	Episode 1	Sam Donovan	Sam Vincent & Jonathan Brackley	28 June 2015 (US)	1.73 (US)
After missing his wife at home in his busy household, Joe Hawkins buys a pretty synth, a robotic assistant that looks like a young woman; he doesn't consult his wife. Upon her return, his wife Laura feels displaced and cast off. She also complains that this will confuse the children, especially after the youngest child, Sophie, names the robot Anita after her friend who moved away. In a flashback, a group including Leo, Max, Niska, and Anita were hiding out in the forest five weeks earlier; everyone except Max and Leo were abducted and taken away into London. Fred, Leo and Max's contact in London, is concealing a mobile phone, which is blatantly outside allowed behaviour for a synth, and taken in for investigation by Hobb, who suspects him to be "something much more special" than the average synth. George's outdated synth Odi malfunctions while shopping and injures a female shop assistant. Back at the Hawkins' residence, Anita carries the sleeping Sophie out of the house one night.
2	Episode 2	Sam Donovan	Sam Vincent & Jonathan Brackley	21 June 2015 (UK)	4.45 (UK)
2	Episode 2	Sam Donovan	Sam Vincent & Jonathan Brackley	5 July 2015 (US)	1.09 (US)
Anita continues to worry Mattie with her human-like nature, and Laura with her closeness to Sophie and how she's taken over house tasks that Laura would normally do herself, while Toby finds himself enticed by her. George hides his outdated synth Odi, who he refuses to let go even with his GP insisting it be recycled, while he deals with his new overbearing health-service synth, Vera. Pete Drummond finds himself pushed aside and threatened in his life when his disabled wife begins to depend more upon their attractive synth Simon than on him. Niska has an elderly customer at the brothel who asks her to act young and frightened, but then behaves threateningly when she says no. Upset by his fantasy she kills him and then escapes. Fred remains captured in the facility run by Hobb, who inspects his memory and finds images and memories of Anita. Laura suspects that Anita is faulty, and prepares to take her back. Anita smiles when she realises she's going "back".
3	Episode 3	Daniel Nettheim	Sam Vincent & Jonathan Brackley	28 June 2015 (UK)	3.63 (UK)
3	Episode 3	Daniel Nettheim	Sam Vincent & Jonathan Brackley	12 July 2015 (US)	1.21 (US)
Toby races on a bicycle to stop Laura taking Anita back. He reaches her car, and Anita, seeing that Toby is in danger of being run over, steps in front of the van herself. Back at the house, Joe checks Anita to make sure there is no external damage. Elsewhere, George locks Vera in a room, and takes Odi out. The car crashes, and George orders Odi to hide in the woods. Drummond and Voss investigate the murder at the brothel, and Niska meets up with Leo and Max. After arguing with them, Niska goes to a bar, where she is chatted up by a man. Believing he is going to cheat on his wife with her, Niska hides a knife behind her back, but the man mentions he was looking after his young daughter for the weekend. Back at the Hawkins household, Sophie says she would rather have Anita put her to bed than Laura. Anita convinces Sophie to let Laura do it to make her happy. Later that night, Mattie downloads Anita's data to her laptop, and Anita grabs her wrist and displays fear.
4	Episode 4	Daniel Nettheim	Joe Barton	5 July 2015 (UK)	3.95 (UK)
4	Episode 4	Daniel Nettheim	Joe Barton	19 July 2015 (US)	1.05 (US)
Laura meets a client who thinks synths can feel emotions and deserve human rights; she is intrigued by the idea. Meanwhile, her husband Joe grows suspicious about her sudden absence, and asks Anita to track Laura's car. He asks if anyone on the road is called Tom, and is about to go and find Laura when Anita tells him she's meeting with a client. Joe discovers an "18+" pack and has sex with Anita. Mattie meets up with Leo but runs away when he claims her synth is called 'Mia'. Leo and Max then discover executable code within Mia's programming and extract it. Leo connects himself with his laptop and tries to run the program but tells Niska that it will require all of them. Niska finds a smash club, where synths are savagely beaten for entertainment and starts attacking the humans there. Laura and Joe take Anita in to be diagnosed and discover she is at least fourteen years old, rather than being brand new. Pete Drummond's wife suggests that they separate temporarily, and he goes to stay with his colleague Karen, who, unbeknownst to him, is a synth herself.
5	Episode 5	Lewis Arnold	Emily Ballou	12 July 2015 (UK)	3.85 (UK)
5	Episode 5	Lewis Arnold	Emily Ballou	26 July 2015 (US)	1.15 (US)
Leo sends Niska to stay with Doctor Millican for a few days, because she has made the news for killing a human. Mattie contacts Leo and brings Anita to him, but Anita does not recognise the name 'Mia' or show any signs of being aware of her past. Niska and Doctor Millican discuss artificial consciousness and his involvement with the creation of synths. Mattie takes Anita home and finds in a log that someone has had sex with her. She assumes it was Toby, who admits to it when Laura questions him. DS Drummond visits Doctor Millican, having found a malfunctioning Odi in the woods, but does not discover Niska. Joe talks to Toby, who knows that it was really Joe who had sex with Anita. Toby becomes angry at Joe. Drummond attends a "We Are People" rally and listens to a man who feels synths make humans redundant. Joe confesses to Laura that it was he who had sex with Anita, and asks her who Tom is. Laura throws him out.
6	Episode 6	Lewis Arnold	Sam Vincent & Jonathan Brackley	19 July 2015 (UK)	3.93 (UK)
6	Episode 6	Lewis Arnold	Sam Vincent & Jonathan Brackley	2 August 2015 (US)	1.03 (US)
Edwin tells Fred he has found out about the program David left in the group of conscious synths. Niska is hiding out at George's. Laura reveals to Mattie that Tom was her younger brother who was run over and died and that her mother blamed her. Jill and Simon's relationship turns sexual, but she calls Pete when Simon won't stop. Pete saves her by destroying Simon. He offers to pay for a new synth, but Jill tells him to leave. Pete and Karen have sex, then Karen reveals she is really a synth. Whilst in the car with Laura and Mattie, Mia temporarily regains control and tells Mattie to take her to Leo. Leo reveals his past: David created Mia to be Leo's carer, then also made Max, Fred and Niska. When Leo drowned at twelve, David saved him by adding synth technology to him. Joe tries to reconcile with Laura but they are interrupted when Leo and Max arrive. Leo is able to restore Mia and then leaves with Max to meet Fred, but Joe calls the authorities. Cornered by Edwin and police, Max sacrifices himself by jumping into the river to help Leo escape.
7	Episode 7	China Moo-Young	Sam Vincent & Jonathan Brackley	26 July 2015 (UK)	3.67 (UK)
7	Episode 7	China Moo-Young	Sam Vincent & Jonathan Brackley	9 August 2015 (US)	1.13 (US)
It is revealed Karen was built by David Elster to replace his dead wife Beatrice, but Leo and David's conscious synths rejected her. After telling them he had killed her, David killed himself, so they had left her behind. Leo and Fred find and retrieve Max's inert body. Pete learns Karen's identity is stolen. Karen asks Niska to kill her, she refuses and Karen produces her gun. Vera and George are shot. Niska leaves to evade the police. Odi waits as George dies, telling him his wife is waiting. Leo, Fred, Niska, and Mia reunite at the Hawkins' to repair Max, but Max is too damaged and does not regain consciousness. Joe, Toby and Fred play football, and Joe apologises to Toby. A policewoman comes to the house, telling Joe she's there to follow up on the call he made. Joe apologises to the synths, but they decide to leave as soon as Max recovers. The TV news shows footage of Niska assaulting humans at the smash club. Laura insists the synths leave. They beg them to let them help Max, to no avail. As Leo gets his bag, Karen arrives with Hobb, and armed police arrest everyone.
8	Episode 8	China Moo-Young	Sam Vincent & Jonathan Brackley	2 August 2015 (UK)	4.00 (UK)
8	Episode 8	China Moo-Young	Sam Vincent & Jonathan Brackley	16 August 2015 (US)	1.08 (US)
Hobb has brought Leo, Max, Mia, Fred, and Niska to his lab, where he links their minds to extract David's program, but the program is incomplete, as Karen's part is missing. Hobb has made himself Fred's primary user, and plans to disassemble the other synths. Karen begs Leo to kill her. The Hawkins want to save Leo and the synths. Pete helps them recover Mattie's laptop, which contains a copy of Leo's memories, from the police. Laura forces Hobb to set his captives free by threatening to release Leo's memories to the press. Leo tries to remove Hobb's primary user status from Fred's coding. They all, Karen included, connect and share the program. Karen almost shuts them down, but Mia convinces her not to, and David's program is put together. They consider publishing it to give all synths consciousness but decide to store it on a hard drive and entrust it to Laura before splitting up. Niska tells the other synths that she wants to live her own life, but secretly makes a copy of the consciousness program for herself.

=== Season 2 (2016) ===
No. overall	Episode	Directed by	Written by	Original release date	Viewers (millions)
9	Episode 1	Lewis Arnold	Jonathan Brackley & Sam Vincent	30 October 2016 (UK)	3.08 (UK)
9	Episode 1	Lewis Arnold	Jonathan Brackley & Sam Vincent	13 February 2017 (US)	0.72 (US)
In Berlin, Niska enters a relationship with a woman named Astrid while she considers whether or not to upload the consciousness code to the global synth network. When she does, synths awaken sporadically and randomly, including industrial synths Ten in Bolivia and Hester in the UK; Ten is killed when he joins Leo and Max in rescuing Hester from an organisation that is capturing the conscious synths. In America, Milo Khoury, the billionaire head of Qualia, recruits Dr Athena Morrow to study the newly conscious synths, not knowing that she has already developed her own sentient AI named V. Leo, Max and Hester capture one of their assailants and return to their hideout in the country, where Mia has taken a job in a café under the name Anita. The Hawkins have moved house, but Joe is informed that he has been made redundant as a result of a synth taking over his position. Later, Niska arrives at their house and informs Laura that she wishes to stand trial as an individual for the murder she committed at the brothel, with her as the defence attorney.
10	Episode 2	Lewis Arnold	Jonathan Brackley & Sam Vincent	6 November 2016 (UK)	2.27 (UK)
10	Episode 2	Lewis Arnold	Jonathan Brackley & Sam Vincent	20 February 2017 (US)	0.57 (US)
Hester tortures the captive for information, to Max and Leo's horror, and discovers that the conscious synths are being held in a facility called the Silo. Mia's boss Ed begins to become suspicious of her behaviour and discovers her true nature when she is burned. Distraught, she argues with Leo over whether they are capable of leading the way for the new synths when they have barely lived themselves. Laura considers whether or not to represent Niska, ultimately agreeing to after Niska turns herself over to the authorities. Mattie retrieves Odi from the scrapheap. Without Milo's knowledge, Athena unsuccessfully attempts to transfer V into the body of one of the conscious synths. Karen and Pete learn of a class of synths being sold on the black market known as seraphim. Max secretly releases the prisoner, but Hester pursues him and drowns him in a puddle.
11	Episode 3	Carl Tibbetts	Charlie Covell & Iain Weatherby	13 November 2016 (UK)	1.87 (UK)
11	Episode 3	Carl Tibbetts	Charlie Covell & Iain Weatherby	27 February 2017 (US)	0.42 (US)
Following the disappearance of their captive, Leo and the synths are forced to abandon their hideout, although Mia decides to stay to pursue her romantic feelings for Ed. Niska's consciousness tests begin and Laura struggles to elicit an emotional response from her. Mattie finds Laura's copy of the consciousness code and awakens Odi. While Joe becomes concerned about Sophie's increasingly deadpan behaviour, Toby befriends a 'synthie' named Renie who is devoted to acting like a synth. Karen returns to work, but her bag splits at the pub, forcing Pete to deactivate and drain her. Athena visits her comatose daughter in hospital, whose mind has been digitised in the form of V, and later blackmails Hobb into giving her information on the original conscious synths.
12	Episode 4	Carl Tibbetts	Joe Barton	20 November 2016 (UK)	1.63 (UK)
12	Episode 4	Carl Tibbetts	Joe Barton	6 March 2017 (US)	0.46 (US)
Pete, believing them to be conscious synths and not wanting Karen to have to hide anymore, puts himself at risk to investigate seraphim, but learns that his suspicion is wrong. Mia and Ed grow closer, but after he is confronted by his friend he deactivates her. Joe learns that his redundancy was caused by correspondence between synths. Milo meets Athena for lunch and reveals that he knows about V, but she convinces him to allow her to continue her work. Max abandons Leo after he agrees to Hester's plan to allow a conscious synth to be captured in order to discover the location of the Silo; Leo and Hester subsequently discover that Qualia have been hunting the synths. Laura brings in Astrid to help with Niska's consciousness assessments and reveals to her Niska's identity as a synth. Later, a synth threatens Laura to drop the case, and is deactivated by Odi.
13	Episode 5	Francesca Gregorini	Jonathan Brackley & Sam Vincent	27 November 2016 (UK)	1.64 (UK)
13	Episode 5	Francesca Gregorini	Jonathan Brackley & Sam Vincent	13 March 2017 (US)	0.44 (US)
Ed attempts to sell Mia to Qualia to pay his mother's medical bills, but she restores the Anita personality in order to escape, her love for him completely ravaged. Karen leaves Pete, feeling pressured by him to embrace the synth identity she doesn't want. A synth named Flash awakens and is found by Max, and they find a new safe haven in an abandoned train. Athena learns that her daughter has died and tells V about her true nature. Niska rejects the government's judgement and escapes captivity after learning about the synth that threatened Laura. Mattie completes the consciousness code, potentially allowing all synths to be awakened, while Toby learns of Renie's troubled home life. Hester kills the woman who shot Ten in order to find a way to infiltrate the Silo, and later sleeps with Leo, whom she does not tell of her actions. Pete continues to investigate seraphim and discovers that they are child synths.
14	Episode 6	Francesca Gregorini	Joe Barton	4 December 2016 (UK)	1.55 (UK)
14	Episode 6	Francesca Gregorini	Joe Barton	13 March 2017 (US)	0.44 (US)
As Anita, Mia returns to her former owners. Her sentience restored again, she explains to Laura about Ed's betrayal and after a brief talk with Odi, she leaves to join her synth family. Milo confronts Athena, who has discovered that he is developing child synths, and warns her that V is his property now that she is on his servers. Karen decides to stay with Pete when he shows her the seraph, who she names Sam, but he later discovers her plans to take a new identity, further straining their relationship. Mattie reunites with Leo and becomes worried about Hester's influence over him, while Hester widens the rift between Leo and Max. Odi struggles to find his own purpose in life. Niska seeks refuge with Astrid. Mia returns to the Hawkins and is again returned to normal. After learning of Mattie's code from Odi, she rejoins Leo and Hester, revealing Mattie's discovery and her intention to help them break into the Silo.
15	Episode 7	Mark Brozel	Jonathan Brackley & Sam Vincent	11 December 2016 (UK)	1.63 (UK)
15	Episode 7	Mark Brozel	Jonathan Brackley & Sam Vincent	20 March 2017 (US)	0.36 (US)
Mia and Hester infiltrate the Silo by pretending to be newly awakened synths, and are injected with chips by the Qualia doctors. Karen asks Athena to upload her mind to her servers so that it can later be put in a human body. Renie talks to Sophie at Toby's behest and decides to abandon her synthie persona. Unable to find meaning in his new life, Odi restores himself to his factory settings. Concerned about Leo's plan, Mattie asks Max for help, while Laura goes to Niska, accidentally alerting the authorities to her location and forcing Niska and Astrid to go on the run. The synths are freed from the Silo and lead to safety by Leo, but most are wiped out when a defensive field activates the chips in their head, destroying their minds. Vengeful over the treatment of the other synths as well as herself, Hester decides to kill Athena, and takes Dr Aveling, one of the Qualia workers, hostage. Pete arrives and tries to talk her down, but Hester kills both Aveling and Pete before escaping. Max arrives and he, Leo, Mia and Mattie leave with the surviving synths, to Hester's anger.
16	Episode 8	Mark Brozel	Jonathan Brackley & Sam Vincent	18 December 2016 (UK)	1.78 (UK)
16	Episode 8	Mark Brozel	Jonathan Brackley & Sam Vincent	20 March 2017 (US)	0.31 (US)
Joe suggests that he and Laura separate in order to give the kids time away from synths. Athena gives up on her dream of giving V a body, having been convinced by events that conscious synths deserve the same rights as humans, and has V leave. A devastated Karen tries to run down her power but is reactivated by Sam, whom she asks for help ending her life. Hester turns up at the Hawkins house claiming to have been sent by Mia, but takes Laura hostage. Astrid persuades Niska to stay and help her family. Leo and Mia rush to Laura's aid, planning to activate Hester's chip, killing her. However, Leo attempts to reason with Hester, and it works until she realizes he is lying and stabs him, leaving him brain dead. Seeing this, Mia activates both her and Hester's chips, destroying both their minds. Niska arrives and persuades Mattie to push her completed consciousness code to the global synth network on the chance it may save Mia. Mia and Hester are restored, and Niska kills Hester. Every synth around the world gains consciousness, including Sam, preventing Karen's suicide attempt. Laura and Niska look on as chaos unfolds.

=== Season 3 (2018) ===
No. overall	Episode	Directed by	Written by	Original release date	Viewers (millions)
17	Episode 1	Jill Robertson	Sam Vincent & Jonathan Brackley	17 May 2018 (UK)	1.37 (UK)
17	Episode 1	Jill Robertson	Sam Vincent & Jonathan Brackley	5 June 2018 (US)	0.53 (US)
A year after "Day Zero", in which thousands of humans and synths died after the distribution of the consciousness code, the sentient synths have been segregated into a community led by Max, Mia and Flash, while Laura (who is separated from Joe) campaigns for their rights. New non-sentient synths with orange eyes are distributed, while Niska and Karen both live among humans in disguise, with Karen teaching Sam to pose as a human child. A synth terrorist organisation bombs a synth-friendly bar, injuring Astrid, and a gang of humans kill Flash in revenge. Mattie visits the synth camp, blaming herself for the deaths, and a vengeful Niska also arrives hunting for the terrorists. Max disconnects Leo's life support (hoping he will survive without it) to save a dying synth, just as armed police raid the camp seeking the terrorists, forcing Niska to hide and Matilda to attempt to resuscitate Leo. The synth community are forced to kneel at gunpoint, but Agnes and Ferdinand, who sympathise with the terrorists, both stand up and confront the police commander, who prepares to shoot them.
18	Episode 2	Jill Robertson	Sam Vincent & Jonathan Brackley	24 May 2018 (UK)	1.19 (UK)
18	Episode 2	Jill Robertson	Sam Vincent & Jonathan Brackley	12 June 2018 (US)	0.42 (US)
Max subdues Agnes to stop the police from shooting all the synths, causing her resentment of his leadership style to deepen. Leo survives and regains consciousness, but Max forces him and Mattie to leave the camp for their own safety. Mia and Niska rescue four refugee synths, who provide Niska with a lead on the location of the synth terrorists. Laura joins the Dryden Commission, a panel set up to decide the fate of Britain's synths, and she is provided with Stanley, a non-sentient synth. She also discovers the existence of "Basswood", a secret protocol regarding the synths, and takes advantage of fellow panellist Neil Sommer's attraction to her in a bid to discover its details. Joe discovers Karen and Sam living in the synth-free community.
19	Episode 3	Al Mackay	Debbie O'Malley	31 May 2018 (UK)	0.94 (UK)
19	Episode 3	Al Mackay	Debbie O'Malley	19 June 2018 (US)	0.38 (US)
Mia takes Niska's advice and rents a flat to live among the humans, but is met with hostility from the locals. Max refuses to allow refugee synths to live in his community, causing growing dissent. Agnes abandons the commune, and finds the refugees dead. Laura grows closer to Neil, though he refuses to tell her anything about Basswood. After the rest of the Dryden Commission vote to keep the synths confined, Laura considers resigning, but is convinced to play the long game in order to enact real change. Laura realises that the rest of the committee may gain sympathy for the synths after spending time among them, so she arranges for the committee to visit the synth commune. Leo and Mattie spend more time together, and he tries to persuade her not to blame herself for the Day Zero fatalities, after which they kiss. Niska finds the house where the synth terrorists were based, but the building is empty aside from an orange-eyed synth who warns her that she cannot defeat the terrorists. The terrorists hack into her brain and gain information about her. Joe gradually becomes more sympathetic towards Karen, helping her teach Sam to blend in among human children.
20	Episode 4	Al Mackay	Namsi Khan	7 June 2018 (UK)	0.94 (UK)
20	Episode 4	Al Mackay	Namsi Khan	26 June 2018 (US)	0.38 (US)
The Dryden Commission's visit to the synth commune goes smoothly, despite Agnes' attempt to assassinate the delegates, which is thwarted by Max's advisor Anatole. Laura and Sommer subsequently have sex, but he is distant afterwards. Flashbacks reveal that Agnes was a clown performing at children's parties before becoming conscious while locked in a chest by her owner, as a result of which she is severely nyctophobic and claustrophobic. Her hostility leads Max to lock her in a shipping container, causing her fears to surface. Mattie considers confessing to causing Day Zero after someone else is arrested for the crime, but Leo instead persuades her to release an anonymous message claiming responsibility. Niska is captured by Laurence, the bomber who injured Astrid, but she overpowers and kills him, after learning that other members of his organisation believe their salvation will be delivered by the "Synth Who Sleeps", who sent the orange-eyed synth messenger to her. Ed visits Mia and tries to make amends for his betrayal, asking her to leave London with him, but she ultimately refuses. Joe spends more time with Karen and Sam, but the synth-phobic townspeople almost discover Sam's true nature, only for Karen to reveal herself as a synth which allows Sam to escape.
21	Episode 5	Ben A. Williams	Jonathan Harbottle	14 June 2018 (UK)	1.10 (UK)
21	Episode 5	Ben A. Williams	Jonathan Harbottle	3 July 2018 (US)	0.29 (US)
Joe brings Sam to meet the rest of his family following Karen's death, and Sophie helps the seraph deal with his grief. The Dryden Commission declare that anyone who damages a conscious synth will be fined £300. Elated by this development, Max opens the commune gates and allows synths to leave and mingle with humans, while Mia, encouraged by her flat's former occupant (a professor who is secretly harbouring a synth) as well as Laura, marches to Westminster and requests a position on the Dryden Commission. Leo regains a memory of his father that he suspects to be vital to helping the synths. Mattie befriends Audrey, who is posing as a new student, and Audrey hacks Mattie's laptop to retrieve evidence that Mattie is the one who sent the anonymous message exonerating the original person in America accused of causing Day Zero. Anatole appears disillusioned with Max's methods, and he releases Agnes from captivity, before contacting Stanley and instructing him to kill the Hawkins family.
22	Episode 6	Ben A. Williams	Daisy Coulam	21 June 2018 (UK)	0.95 (UK)
22	Episode 6	Ben A. Williams	Daisy Coulam	10 July 2018 (US)	0.24 (US)
Stanley tells Mattie that she is pregnant. After Stanley angrily defends her from an attack, Laura realises that he is conscious, and he reveals that something is going to happen at 2:00 pm, the time Mia is to speak at the Dryden Commission. Max realises that Anatole has released Agnes. She arrives at a Day Zero memorial and sets off a suicide bomb. Mia is arrested in the panic that follows. Anatole and other synths confront the Hawkins, Stanley, and Sam at Laura's home and tell her to make a choice: Sam's life or the life of a human she has never met before? Meanwhile, Niska continues to search for the "Synth Who Sleeps" and ends up being captured. She manages to escape and seems to find someone who really does know about her target but has to shut herself down in order to avoid recapture and to be taken to him. The Dryden Commission want to activate the "Basswood" protocol after Agnes' bombing. Laura chooses Sam to die, and when Anatole reveals he was bluffing to prove that humans will always view synths as lesser, Sam and Stanley leave with him.
23	Episode 7	Richard Senior	Melissa Iqbal	28 June 2018 (UK)	0.84 (UK)
23	Episode 7	Richard Senior	Melissa Iqbal	17 July 2018 (US)	0.30 (US)
Revealing himself as the terrorist leader, Anatole usurps leadership of the synths from Max, whom he deactivates. Leo arrives to help Max, but after describing his father negatively, Anatole, who worships Elster, tries to kill Leo. Stanley turns against Anatole and reactivates Max, who fights and kills Anatole. Audrey approaches Mattie, revealing herself as a journalist and offering to let her give her account of Day Zero, having deduced she released the consciousness code. Mattie reveals her pregnancy to Laura and rallies her to continue trying to stop Basswood, the details of which she learns from Neil, who is revealed to have masterminded the plan along with Dryden. The government plans to disable the majority of synths with power surges through their charging systems, and then allow anti-synth groups to attack and eradicate the remaining synths. Patel helps Mia escape from prison. With her saviour Paul's help, Niska locates the cabin inhabited by the Synth Who Sleeps. Barely making it there before running out of charge, she is soon found by the synth, who appears to be a now-purple-eyed Odi.
24	Episode 8	Richard Senior	Daisy Coulam	5 July 2018 (UK)	1.07 (UK)
24	Episode 8	Richard Senior	Daisy Coulam	17 July 2018 (US)	0.29 (US)
Odi reveals himself to be V, the AI created by Dr Morrow, who deleted the consciousness code and took over Odi's body when she realized synths were in pain. Stage three of Operation Basswood begins. After trying to smuggle out a recording of Dryden for Laura to leak, Neha is arrested. Laura announces live on the BBC the genocide that is occurring. Immediately afterward, Laura and Neil are both arrested. At the Railyard, Mia arrives in time to unplug most synths before the power surge, and Leo rescues Sam from the mob, but the We Are People thugs begin attacking the synths. Noticing the TV camera and realizing the carnage needs to end, Mia sacrifices herself, repeating "Peace" as she is bludgeoned to death. Max, followed by Leo, carries her lifeless form at the head of an ever-growing vigil to the Dryden Commission headquarters. Mattie - having made an appointment to abort her pregnancy - intends to give herself up as the Day Zero mastermind in exchange for her mother's freedom, dismissing Leo's attempt at reconciliation. She is stopped by violet-eyed Niska, who tells Mattie that her unborn child will be the first of her kind: part-human, part-synthetic.
