= Episode 3 (Humans series 1) =

- Humans episode
- Episode no.: Series 1 Episode 3
- Directed by: Daniel Nettheim
- Written by: Jonathan Brackley and Sam Vincent
- Original air date: 28 June 2015
- Running time: 47 minutes

Episode chronology
← Previous "Episode 2"	Next → "Episode 4"

"Episode 3" is the third episode of the first series of Humans, a show based on Real Humans and co-produced by Channel 4 and AMC. It originally aired in the UK on 28 June 2015 and in the US on 12 July 2015. In this episode, Anita saves Toby's life, George and Odi are involved in a car crash and Niska goes on the run after arguing with Leo and Max. The episode was watched by 5.1 million people in the UK and 1.2 million people in the US. It received mixed reviews.

== Plot ==
Toby races on a bicycle to stop Laura taking Anita back. He reaches her car, and Anita, seeing that Toby is in danger of being run over, steps in front of the van herself. Back at the house, Joe checks Anita to make sure there is no external damage that her self-repair systems didn't trace. Elsewhere, George locks Vera in a room in his house, and takes Odi out in his car. The car crashes, and George orders Odi to hide in the woods. Drummond and Voss investigate the murder at the brothel, and elsewhere, Niska meets up with Leo and Max. After arguing with them, Niska goes to a bar, where she is chatted up by a man and goes to his apartment with him. Believing he is going to cheat on his wife with her, Niska hides a knife behind her back, intending to murder him; but the man mentions he was looking after his young daughter for the weekend. Niska leaves silently, leaving the man confused to see a knife on his chair. Back at the Hawkins household, Sophie says she would rather have Anita put her to bed than Laura. In her bedroom, Anita convinces Sophie to let her mum do it to make her happy. Anita finds a photo album hidden in Laura's room, and a photo of Laura as a child with a younger blonde boy, captioned "Laura and Tom". Later that night, Mattie inputs Anita's data onto her laptop, and Anita grabs her wrist and says "I'm here, help me, help me!" and displays fear, before returning to her usual blank state. Next day as she is being tested and questioned by Laura, Anita begins to ask who Tom is, much to her fury. Laura dismissively demands Anita under no circumstances to mention that name again. Anita apologetically complies. Unbeknownst to them, Joe has been eavesdropping on the entire confrontation.

== Reception ==
=== Ratings ===
On 28 June 2015 in the UK, the episode garnered 3.634 million viewers on Channel 4 and 0.565 million viewers on Channel 4 +1. It was the highest-rated show on the channel that week. Based on 28 day data from BARB, a total of 5.083 million watched the programme on Channel 4 or Channel 4 +1. In the US, the episode aired on 12 July 2015 and received 1.208 million viewers, which was less than the series premiere but more than the previous episode.

=== Reviews ===
Brandon Nowalk of The A.V. Club gave the episode a C+, saying that the episode "is contrived in all the wrong places". Nowalk took issue with the Hawkins family ignoring the fact that Anita disobeyed a direct command and Niska's violent personality. Matt Fowler of IGN, who gave the episode a rating of 7.8 out of 10, enjoyed the dynamic between Anita and Laura and Niska's storyline, but felt that "higher stakes need to kick in for [George] soon" and said Pete Drummond "feels a bit off" and his plot was "rushed and unnatural". Ed Power of The Telegraph gave the episode 3 stars out of 5, criticising the "whiff of cheap soap opera" felt during George's car crash. Neela Debnath of Express said "Humans continues to draw you in each week before stabbing you with fear. It's thought-provoking while the thriller element ensures that it's not a philosophical essay on existentialism." Morgan Jeffery of Digital Spy said that "the separate pieces of Humans are neatly coming together to form a cohesive and engaging whole", other than "curiously removed" but "intriguing" plot involving George and Odi.
