= Episode 4 =

Episode Four, Episode 4 or Episode IV may refer to:

== Film ==
- Comic-Con Episode IV: A Fan's Hope, a 2011 film
- Star Wars (film), also known as Star Wars: Episode IV – A New Hope, a 1977 film

== Music ==
- "Episode IV" (song), a song by Jimmy Eat World

== Television episodes ==
- "Episode 4" (All of Us Are Dead)
- Ashes to Ashes episodes
  - "Episode 4" (Ashes to Ashes series 1)
  - "Episode 4" (Ashes to Ashes series 2)
  - "Episode 4" (Ashes to Ashes series 3)
- "Episode 4" (Baby Reindeer)
- Being Human episodes
  - "Episode 4" (Being Human series 1)
  - "Episode 4" (Being Human series 2)
- "Episode 4" (Devs)
- "Episode 4" (Diyar-e-Dil)
- Fleabag episodes
  - "Episode 4" (Fleabag series 1)
  - "Episode 4" (Fleabag series 2)
- Humans episodes
  - "Episode 4" (Humans series 1)
  - "Episode 4" (Humans series 2)
  - "Episode 4" (Humans series 3)
- "Episode 4" (Kaos)
- Life on Mars episodes:
  - "Episode 4" (Life on Mars, series 1)
  - "Episode 4" (Life on Mars, series 2)
- Luther episodes:
  - "Episode 4" (Luther series 1)
  - "Episode 4" (Luther series 2)
  - "Episode 4" (Luther series 3)
  - "Episode 4" (Luther series 5)
- Mindhunter episodes:
  - "Episode 4" (Mindhunter season 1)
  - "Episode 4" (Mindhunter season 2)
- "Episode 4" (Sword Art Online Abridged)
- "Episode 4" (Tá no Ar)
- "Episode 4" (Twin Peaks)
- "Episode 4" (Uyanış: Büyük Selçuklu)
- "Episode 4" (Years and Years)
- "Episode 4" (The Young Pope)
- "Episode Four" (Dark Matter)
- "Fourth Episode" (The New Pope)

== See also ==
- Episode 3 (disambiguation)
- Episode 5 (disambiguation)
