= Humans (2021 TV series) =

Chinese television series

- Genre: Science fiction Drama
- Based on: Humans (TV series) by Jonathan Brackley and Sam Vincent Real Humans by Lars Lundström
- Developed by: Roland Moore
- Written by: Roland Moore; Tracy Ann Baines; Kathleen Beedles; Fflur Dafydd; Eddie Robson; Tony Sarchet
- Starring: Ray Ma; Stephy Qi
- No. of series: 1
- No. of episodes: 30

Production
- Running time: 45 minutes

Original release
- Network: Tencent Video iQiyi

Humans (Note: Mandarin: 你好，安怡; pinyin: Nǐ hǎo, ān yí) (你好，安怡 or Nǐ hǎo, ān yí (English translation is Hello, An Yi)) is a 2021 Mandarin-language Chinese science-fiction television series remake of the British series Humans, which itself is an adaptation of the Swedish series Real Humans. It stars Ray Ma and Stephy Qi, and was released on the streaming video platforms Tencent Video and iQiyi on February 19, 2021. It ran for 30 episodes.

== Plot ==
In the near future, a family buys an autonomous domestic robot without knowing it is a secret unit powered by human-like artificial intelligence.

== Cast ==
- Ray Ma as Li Yao
- Stephy Qi as An Yi
