= Episode 6 (Humans series 1) =

- Humans episode
- Episode no.: Series 1 Episode 6
- Directed by: Lewis Arnold
- Written by: Jonathan Brackley and Sam Vincent
- Original air date: 19 July 2015

Episode chronology
← Previous "Episode 5"	Next → "Episode 7"

"Episode 6" is the sixth episode of the first series of Humans, a show based on Real Humans and co-produced by Channel 4 and AMC. It aired in the UK on 19 July 2015, and was watched by 3.926 million viewers; it aired on 2 August 2015 in the US to 1.03 million households. The episode received positive reviews.

== Plot ==
Edwin tells Fred he has found out about the program David left in the group of conscious synths; Fred escapes. Niska is hiding out at George's with a broken Odi. Laura reveals to Mattie that Tom is not someone she is having an affair with, but her late younger brother whose fatal childhood accident was blamed on her by her mother. Jill and Simon's relationship turns sexual (although this scene was not broadcast on AMC). Pete and Karen have sex, too, after which Karen reveals to Pete she is really a synth and he runs away. On their way, Anita lets out a huge gasp for breath causing Laura to veer off course. Mia briefly gains consciousness again and gives Mattie a hint how to recover her from Anita. She tells Laura that she too lost somebody important to her; her adopted son, before Anita regains full control, causing Mia's personality to become dormant again. Mattie finds Leo who reveals his past: Mia, the first ever synth built, was created by David as Leo's nanny and adopted mother when Leo's real mother fell mentally-ill and was sectioned. Then David created three more synths, Max, Fred, and Niska. At age 12, when Leo's mother escaped from the ward and drowned them both, Mia rescued him too late from the lake. David brought him back to life by adding synth technology to his brain and body. Eventually, David chased all of them away and committed suicide. Joe reconciles with Laura when Leo and Max arrive with the Hawkins children. Leo is able to restore Mia and then leaves with Max to meet Fred, but Joe calls authorities on them. Cornered by Edwin and police, Max, low on power, sacrifices himself to help Leo escape.

== Reception ==
=== Ratings ===
Airing in the UK on 19 July 2015, the episode received 3.926 million viewers on Channel 4 and 0.387 million viewers on its timeshift service. It was the most watched programme on Channel 4 that week, and the second-most watched on Channel 4 +1. In the US on 2 August 2015, the episode was viewed by 1.03 million households.

=== Reviews ===
Brandon Nowalk of The A.V. Club gave the episode an A−, describing the "tragedy of the Elster kids" as the "real heart of the episode"; Nowalk "teared up" when Leo brought Mia to the surface, saying that it was "an exciting payoff to a story that hasn't been that compelling until this episode". Matt Fowler of IGN rated the episode 8.4 out of 10 and opined that it was "the best episode of Humans to date". Fowler complimented the episode's "staggering amount of answers" and the "sad, pivotal death" of Max; however, he criticised Joe, who he claimed had gone from "complicated to cliche", and Toby, who was described as a "shaky character". Paul Dailly of TV Fanatic said that Humans "is really playing with our emotions", called Joe a "complete idiot" and said Max was "a really interesting character". Neela Debnath of Express wrote "Episode six moves away from being a psychological thriller and a debate about artificial intelligence becomes more of a human drama" and described Max's bridge scene as an "unexpected tear-jerker", "devastating" and "nothing less than upsetting", as Max was "the only likeable character". Kyle Fowle of Entertainment Weekly said that the reunion of Mia, Leo and Max was "genuinely touching" and that Max sacrificing himself was "a beautiful moment". Hannah Verdier of The Guardian said "there are plenty of [shocks] this week", describing Anita's change of persona as "skillful and chilling".
