= Episode 2 (Humans series 1) =

- Humans episode
- Episode no.: Series 1 Episode 2
- Directed by: Sam Donovan
- Written by: Jonathan Brackley and Sam Vincent
- Original air date: 21 June 2015
- Running time: 47 minutes

Episode chronology
← Previous "Episode 1"	Next → "Episode 3"

"Episode 2" is the second episode of the first series of Humans, a show based on Real Humans and co-produced by Channel 4 and AMC. It originally aired in the UK on 21 June 2015 and in the US on 5 July 2015. In this episode, Leo is injured while trying to track down Anita, George Millican is forced to have a new synth to take care of him and Laura returns Anita after discussion with Mattie. The episode was watched by 4.5 million people in the UK and 1 million people in the US. It received fairly positive reviews.

== Plot ==
Laura realises something is strange when her daughter Sophie wakes up in a different pair of pyjamas to the ones she went to bed in, although Sophie does not know why and Anita, their synth, denies that she took Sophie outside.

Mattie is attempting to tamper with the code of a synth, but this fails and the school that owns the synth is alerted. They suspect Mattie and talk with her mother, Laura, but have no evidence. Laura takes Mattie shopping and she admits it was her; they both discuss their dislike of and apprehension towards synths.

Leo finds Silas and learns that Anita has been given a new personality, but he is unable to discover where Anita is. Leo narrowly escapes after things become violent, but is injured in the process. Max helps him along to a public toilet and is able to restart an unconscious Leo by using wires from the lights. Meanwhile, Silas is arrested for tampering with synths. George Millican tells his synth Odi to hide, while his care worker forces a new synth named Vera upon him. George dislikes Vera, but mutters that he was involved in creating her as parts of his original designs are still implemented in synths today.

Niska works at a synth brothel and after a client asks her to act young and scared. Niska, however, refuses to which the man throttles her. Enraged by his twisted fantasy and threatening behavior, the renegade synthetic then strangles the man to death in self-defense, and removes the anti-theft chip from her neck, while leaving the brothel, threatening the clients if they said anything about her leaving the brothel.

Toby goes downstairs in the middle of the night to get water, and alerts Anita whilst she is charging, to which he asks for her to pretend he isn't there. But he tries to lay a hand on her breast, Anita warns him that inappropriate interaction would be reported to his parents as the primary users. Regretful, Toby requests Anita not to mention the incident to his parents.

Next morning, Mattie notices Anita does not transfer data with other synths and Laura makes a phone call to a help desk. After Anita cuddles Sophie without a parent's express permission, Laura announces that she is being returned and tells her children to say goodbye to Anita. When told she is going back, Anita smiles slightly.

== Reception ==
=== Ratings ===
On 21 June 2015 in the UK, the episode garnered 4.45 million viewers on Channel 4 and 0.660 million viewers on its timeshift service. It was the highest-rated show on the channel that week. A total of 5.77 million viewers watched the show including recorded views. In the US, the episode aired on 5 July 2015 and received 1.091 million viewers. This was a significant decline from the number of viewers for the first episode; Brian Cantor of Headline Planet suggested this may have been because the episode aired at the same time as post-World Cup coverage on Fox.

=== Reviews ===
Matt Fowler of IGN gave the episode 7.5 out of 10, claiming that it was "a good follow-up to the premiere" and "kept the intrigue going". Fowler complimented George's story, said that the "big surprise about Leo" did not "truly feel meaningful" as "we hadn't really gotten to know Leo all that well" and suggested "the different stories within Humans might start to interconnect more". Ed Power from The Telegraph gave the episode 3 out of 5 stars, saying that the "side stories were thinly sketched and lacked urgency", although he complimented the "slow-burn fright fest" scene where Anita hugged Sophie "in a ghastly parody of maternal affection". Brandon Nowalk of The A.V. Club gave the episode a B+, saying that George's storyline "digs the deepest" and that "Humans is approaching medical drama territory".

Neil Midgley from Forbes described the episode as "full of ... little mysteries, each of them neatly set up by the reveal of a tiny fragment of plot" and said "Vera is one of the great joys of Humans." Neela Debnath of Express claimed the synths were "more likeable than the 'real people'" and opined that "Humans continues to be a provocative watch that challenges our views on existentialism." Morgan Jeffery of Digital Spy said the episode was "for the most part original, engaging and agreeably unpredictable." Rob Smedly of CultBox described Episode 2 as "another strong episode and one that continues to explore without ever alienating the viewer."
