= Episode 8 (Humans series 1) =

- Humans episode
- Episode no.: Series 1 Episode 8
- Directed by: China Moo-Young
- Written by: Jonathan Brackley and Sam Vincent
- Original air date: 2 August 2015
- Running time: 46 minutes

Episode chronology
← Previous "Episode 7"	Next → "Episode 1"

"Episode 8" is the eighth and final episode of the first series of Humans, a show based on Real Humans and co-produced by Channel 4 and AMC. It originally aired in the UK on 2 August 2015 to an audience of 3.997 million viewers; it aired in the US on 16 August 2015. In this episode, the synths finally manage to execute the code left by David Elster with the help of the Hawkins family. The finale received positive reviews in the UK and mixed reviews in the US.

== Plot ==
Hobb tries to link Fred, Leo, Max, Mia and Niska to extract the programme David Elster made to give synths consciousness; however, this does not work as Karen's part of the code is missing. Hobb alters Fred so that he essentially becomes the primary user; Fred is still capable of hatred towards Hobb but unable to harm him. Hobb plans to destroy the others as he no longer has a use for them, but needs to keep Fred so he can create obedient but conscious synths.

The Hawkins' electronic items are confiscated by the police, but they quickly plot to retrieve Mattie's laptop, which contains a cached copy of some of Leo's memories. Pete Drummond arrives and helps them to steal it back; Mattie, Toby and Pete go to a cafe and send Laura a copy of some of the memories. Laura threatens to send the videos to the press if Hobb does not release the synths, which would release the secret that there are conscious synths to the public. Hobb lets the synths go, although code within Fred allows him to track them.

The Hawkins reunite with the synths and after the police arrive, they flee to an abandoned church. They realise that they can be tracked through Fred and Leo is unable to remove the intrusive code. Leo rings Karen and reveals where they are hiding; Karen chooses to leave Hobb and go to the church to execute the programme in their minds. Karen tries to infect the code, but fails after Mia intervenes. Meanwhile, Laura pulls Joe aside and tells him about the secret about Tom. After the group debate what to do with the programme, Niska stores a copy of it on the hard drive and gives it to Laura. Niska decides to go off on her own and the synths leave without her and without Fred. Mia gives an emotional goodbye to the Hawkins as her former owners return home. After Karen leaves, she is met by Pete and they reluctantly go off together. The final scene shows Niska on a train, with a copy of the programme.

== Reception ==
=== Ratings ===
On 2 August 2015, "Episode 8" aired on Channel 4 in the UK to a viewership of 3.997 million. A further 491,000 households watched the episode on Channel 4 +1. On both channels, Humans was the highest rated show that week.

=== Reviews ===
UK reviews were positive. Michael Hogan of The Telegraph gave the episode 5 out of 5 stars, praising both the "uniformly excellent" cast and the script which was "studded with thoughtful lines"; Hogan said the episode reached a "bittersweet climax" and "neatly teed up the second series". Neela Debnath of Express described Episode 8 as "a heart-pounding finale that remains unpredictable till the end" which "managed to balance the action-thriller elements with the emotional stuff", although "the Hawkins family's return to domesticity seemed somewhat implausible". Morgan Jeffery of Digital Spy called the episode "mighty impressive" but "not perfect", critiquing the way "DS Pete Drummond continues to drift about, not achieving much." Hannah Verdier said in The Guardian that the finale contains "more questions than answers", and "it would be an understatement to say that Humans doesn’t end neatly."

The episode received a mixed reception in the US. Brandon Nowalk of The A.V. Club gave the finale a C rating, describing it as "lazy drama", criticising "how many characters are just standing around inactive" and saying that "the final scenes that rely more on long-term relationships than plot are the ones that sing". Matt Fowler of IGN described "Episode 8" as "solid, if not somewhat easy" and "not a very exciting episode", rating it 7.5 out of 10. Fowler highlighted Laura explaining who Tom was to Joe, Karen trying to destroy the synths' programme and Pete searching for Karen as some of the positive scenes in the positive, but disliked the fact that the "We Are People" march "never truly paid off". Angelica Jade Bastién of Vulture gave the episode 3 out of 5 stars, saying that it had "bright spots" but "it falters because the characters make dramatic, unexplained shifts".
