= Episode 8 =

Episode Eight, Episode 8 or Episode VIII may refer to:

== Film ==
- Star Wars: The Last Jedi also known as Star Wars: Episode VIII – The Last Jedi, a 2017 film

== Television episodes ==
- "Episode 8" (Humans series 1)
- "Episode 8" (Twin Peaks)
- "Episode 1.8" (Secret Diary of a Call Girl), 2007

== See also ==
- "Eight Episodes", a science fiction short story by Robert Reed
- Episode 7 (disambiguation)
- Episode 9 (disambiguation)
