= Episode 7 (Humans series 1) =

- Humans episode
- Episode no.: Series 1 Episode 7
- Directed by: China Moo-Young
- Written by: Jonathan Brackley and Sam Vincent
- Original air date: 26 July 2015

Episode chronology
← Previous "Episode 6"	Next → "Episode 8"

"Episode 7" is the seventh episode of the first series of Humans, a show based on Real Humans and co-produced by Channel 4 and AMC. In the penultimate episode of the first series, a secret about Karen is revealed, attempts are made to repair Max and police arrest every synth in the Hawkins' house.

The episode aired in the UK on 26 July 2015 to an audience of 4.83 million viewers; it aired on 9 August 2015 in the US, where 1.13 million households watched the show. The episode received positive reviews, with several critics highlighting the exchanges between Niska and Sophie as particularly humorous.

== Plot ==
It is revealed Karen was built by David Elster to replace his dead wife Beatrice, but Leo and David's conscious synths rejected her. After telling them he had killed her, David killed himself, so they had left her behind. Leo and Fred find and retrieve Max's inert body. Pete learns Karen's identity is stolen. At George's, Karen asks Niska to kill her. She refuses, and Karen produces her gun. Vera and George are shot. Niska leaves to evade the police. Odi waits as George dies, telling him his wife is waiting in the next room, an old memory. Leo, Fred, Niska, and Mia reunite at the Hawkins' to repair Max. Sophie tries to bond with Niska, but finds it hard due to Niska's attitude, and Niska finds it hard as well due to Sophie's happy attitude. They eventually bond when Sophie thinks synths need freedom as well. Max is too damaged to be repaired and does not regain consciousness. Joe, Toby and Fred play football, and Joe apologises to Toby. A policewoman comes to the house, telling Joe she's there to follow up on the call he made. Joe apologises to the synths, but they decide to leave as soon as Max recovers. The TV news shows footage of Niska assaulting humans at the smash club. Laura insists the synths leave. They beg them to let them help Max, to no avail. As Leo gets his bag, Karen arrives with Hobb, and armed police arrest everyone.

== Reception ==
=== Ratings ===
In the UK, the episode aired on 26 July 2015; it was watched live by 4.127 million viewers on Channel 4, and viewed by 4.830 million people including people who watched Channel 4 +1. 1.13 million viewers watched "Episode 7" in the US when it first aired on 9 August 2015, with 0.4% of adults 18-49 in the country watching the show.

=== Reviews ===
Brandon Nowalk from The A.V. Club gave a rating of B+ to this episode, summarising that "most of the episode is about pairing up the different humans with the different conscious synths, each to great effect", particularly complimenting the "crackerjack comic duo" of Niska and Sophie. Matt Fowler of IGN scored the episode 7.4 out of 10. Fowler "really liked Odi and George's final moments together", described the "Beatrice reveal" as "a good twist" and complimented the scenes between Niska and Sophie. However, he said that the episode contained "too much dopey family drama for a penultimate episode" and "really pushed the limits of how many times characters could change their mind within the course of forty some odd minutes". Paul Dailly from TV Fanatic gave the seventh episode a score of 4.5 out of 5. Dailly opined that it was "another solid episode" of Humans, which was "continuing to improve by the week".

Neela Debnath of Express gave the episode a very positive review, saying "Humans continues to compel us and keep us wanting more. Even detractors of sci-fi will be hooked onto the show pretty quickly." Kyle Fowle of Entertainment Weekly described the episode as "essentially one long meditation on the implications of synth consciousness" and summarised the plot as "the synths and the Hawkins family hurry to save Max while Karen and Hobb form an unlikely partnership." According to Hannah Verdier in The Guardian, "this episode had the sharpest lines of the series" and "Sophie teaching Niska to play with dolls was beautifully done."
