= Episode 5 =

Episode Five, Episode 5 or Episode V may refer to:

- The Empire Strikes Back also known as Star Wars: Episode V – The Empire Strikes Back, a 1980 film
- "Episode 5" (Humans series 1)
- "Episode 5" (Twin Peaks)

== See also ==
- Episode 4 (disambiguation)
- Episode 6 (disambiguation)
