= Episode 5 (Humans series 1) =

- Humans episode
- Episode no.: Series 1 Episode 5
- Directed by: Lewis Arnold
- Written by: Emily Ballou
- Original air date: 12 July 2015
- Running time: 47 minutes

Episode chronology
← Previous "Episode 4"	Next → "Episode 6"

"Episode 5" is the fifth episode of the first series of Humans, a show based on Real Humans and co-produced by Channel 4 and AMC. In this episode, Niska discusses technology and consciousness with Doctor Millican, Leo fails to extract code from Anita and Mattie discovers someone has had sex with Anita. It originally aired in the UK on 12 July 2015, where it was watched live by 3.847 million households. In the United States, the episode aired on 26 July 2015 to a viewership of 1.15 million. The episode received positive reviews.

== Plot ==
Niska is sent to stay with Doctor Millican for a few days; it is unsafe for her to be seen in public as her face is all over the news, as she is the first synth to commit murder. They discuss her consciousness and Millican's past involvement in creating synth technology. DS Drummond visits his house, after someone discovered Odi's body in the woods, and searches the place but does not discover Niska. Following this, Drummond attends a "We Are People" rally, listening to a man explain his hatred towards synths.

Mattie contacts Leo and drives away with Anita, just before Joe can recycle her. Leo is unable to extract the code he needs from Anita, who still has no recollection of the name "Mia" or her previous personality. Mattie examines Anita's daily logs to find any older files about her, and finds the 18+ pack that Joe activated. and assumes it was Toby who had sex with Anita. He says he did have sex with Anita, and is ashamed of it. Joe offers to talk to him in the morning, and Toby admits that he was lying, to try and cover up for Joe. Joe admits to Laura that he was the one that had sex with Anita. She becomes very distressed, especially when he asks who Tom is, and tells him to leave. The episode ends with Joe getting a taxi and being driven away.

== Reception ==
=== Ratings ===
In the UK on 12 July 2015, 3.847 million households watched the episode on Channel 4, and 0.470 million watched on Channel 4 +1. In the United States, the episode aired on 26 July 2015 and garnered a viewership of 1.15 million.

=== Reviews ===
Gerard O'Donovan of The Telegraph gave the episode 4 stars out of 5, saying "for the first time since its opening episode Humans really got to the heart of what good science fiction does best": "making us reflect on the human condition." O'Donovan opined that "the only disappointment was that last week's big reveal – that detective Karen Voss (Ruth Bradley) is a synth hiding in plain sight – failed to be developed in any significant way this week."

Neela Debnath of Express said that "episode five serves as more of a developmental instalment than anything else", and described the series as "basically like an unofficial sequel to Blade Runner that we've been wanting to see for a while." Cameron K McEwan of Digital Spy said it was an "engrossing instalment" and "incredible episode", raising both plot-related and ethical questions.
