= Episode 7 =

Episode Seven, Episode 7 or Episode VII may refer to:

== Film ==
- Star Wars: The Force Awakens also known as Star Wars: Episode VII – The Force Awakens, a 2015 film

== Television episodes ==
- "Episode 7" (Humans series 1)
- "Episode 7" (Tá no Ar)
- "Episode 7" (Twin Peaks)

== See also ==
- The Seven, 1996 episode of Seinfeld
- 7 (disambiguation)

== See also ==
- Episode 6 (disambiguation)
- Episode 8 (disambiguation)
