= Episode 6 =

Episode Six, Episode 6 or Episode VI may refer to:

- Return of the Jedi, a 1983 film also known as Star Wars: Episode VI – Return of the Jedi
- Episode Six (band), a British band
- "Episode 6" (Humans series 1)
- "Episode 6" (Twin Peaks)

== See also ==
- Episode 5 (disambiguation)
- Episode 7 (disambiguation)
