= Episode 1 (Humans series 1) =

- Humans episode
- Episode no.: Series 1 Episode 1
- Directed by: Sam Donovan
- Written by: Jonathan Brackley and Sam Vincent
- Original air date: 14 June 2015
- Running time: 46 minutes

Episode chronology
← Previous —	Next → "Episode 2"

"Episode 1" is the first episode of the first series of Humans, a show based on Real Humans and co-produced by Channel 4 and AMC. It originally aired in the UK on 14 June 2015 and in the US on 28 June 2015. In this episode, Joe buys a "synth" (synthetic human) for his family, to his wife's horror. Meanwhile, George cannot bear to abandon his outdated synth Odi. The episode was watched live by 5.47 million people in the UK and 1.73 million people in the US. It received mostly positive reviews.

== Plot ==
Joe Hawkins decides to buy an android called a synth to help take care of household responsibilities for his family, due to his wife Laura's constant work-related absences. He purchases a synth and his young daughter Sophie immediately becomes close friends with it, choosing to call it "Anita". Joe's son Toby is attracted to Anita, while Mattie, the eldest daughter, strongly dislikes it, fearing synthetic technology will soon render her education useless. Laura returns home and becomes angry at Joe for getting a synth without consulting her; she is afraid of them and becomes paranoid around Anita, especially when she continues to laugh at Joe's microchip joke.

At night, Laura finds Anita watching Sophie sleeping; she finds this disconcerting and firmly tells Anita that that is her job. Anita then goes outside and admires the stars, until Laura tells her to go back inside. She becomes suspicious about the android's query about the moon as well as her accidentally scalding her arm. Later, Anita watches Sophie sleeping again and is seen carrying the little girl out of the house and kissing her head into the night. A flashback shows the synth hiding out in a forest with Leo, Max and several other characters; everyone other than Leo and Max are captured and taken to London. One of their contacts in London, a synth, is taken in by Hobb for investigation.

Leo tracks down one of the synths, a female synth called Niska now forced to work as a prostitute in a brothel. Leo advises her that he is planning to rescue her and the other synths that were captured. This inspires Niska to plan an escape from the brothel.

Meanwhile, George's synth Odi malfunctions in a supermarket and injures a woman. DS Drummond comes to investigate and orders George to recycle Odi, as he is expirable, and glitchable. George is shown in his home talking to Odi, who recalls memories that George has been unable to since his stroke. He does not recycle him, even when a new synth called Vera arrives to take care of him. George dislikes Vera and resents her controlling nature.

== Reception ==
=== Ratings ===
On 14 June 2015 in the UK, the episode garnered 5.465 million viewers on Channel 4 and 0.655 million viewers on its timeshift service. It was the highest-rated show on the channel that week. A total of 6.814 million viewers watched the show including recorded views. In the US, the episode aired on 28 June 2015 and received 1.73 million live viewers. Three days later, 2.5 million viewers in total had watched the episode.

=== Reviews ===
Brandon Nowalk of The A.V. Club gave the episode a B, describing most of the adaptation changes from Real Humans as "inexplicable" and the final scene as "a plea to please keep watching". Neil Midgley of Forbes said that the episode didn't "[reach] Blade Runner standards of greatness", but "offered a pretty good start". Midgley described it as "rather beautifully put together too", although he commented, "Humans wasn't perfect. Some of the dialogue needed declunking and, for me, the incidental music was a bit too obviously futuristic-spooky-woo-woo."

Morgan Jeffery of Digital Spy said that the pilot was a "remarkable success", praising the "comprehensively brilliant" cast and "plausible" world created by the writers. Matt Fowler of IGN rated the episode 7.6 out of 10, calling it "a good start" but noting that the show was "rushing into the A.I. territory at the expense of some of the excellent subtleties featured in the other stories". Neela Debnath of Express complimented the "convincingly creepy" acting, described the episode as a "less bleak" version of Black Mirror and said the series was "likely to do very well."
