= Lisette Pagler =

South-Korean Swedish musical singer and actress

- Born: 5 January 1981 (age 45); South Korea
- Occupations: Actress, singer

Lisette Pia Hee Young Pagler (born 5 January 1981) is a South-Korean-Swedish musical singer and actress, best known internationally for her role as an intelligent android in the TV series Real Humans.

== Early life ==
Pagler grew up in Nättraby, and was educated at the ballet academy's musical department in Gothenburg. She got her big break after winning Sveriges Television talent show Jakten på Julia, in which the winner won the female lead in the musical Romeo and Juliet (based on the Shakespeare play), opposite singer Måns Zelmerlöw.

== Career ==
Pagler is a mezzo-soprano singer, and in 2004 she took part in the musical Stoppa världen! – Jag vill kliva av. She reunited with Måns Zelmerlöw for the season finale of Allsång på Skansen in August 2010. Since 2012, Pagler has played Mimi/Anita, a hubot (robot that looks human), as a main cast member in the science fiction television series Äkta Människor (Real Humans), which is broadcast on SVT. She has also had roles in the musicals Cats and Singin' in the Rain.

== Filmography ==
Year	Title	Role	Notes
2012–2014	Real Humans	Mimi / Anita	20 episodes
2014	Viva Hate	Dolores	2 episodes
2015–2017, 2019	Gåsmamman	Hanna Lind	29 episodes
2016	Beck – Gunvald	Anna Murlöf	Television film
2016	Selmas saga	Journalist	Episode: "Episode #1.15"
2017	Rum 213	Elviras mamma	
2018	Sthlm Requiem	Maria Blomgren	2 episodes
2019	Fartblinda	Nina Vojnovic	5 episodes
2020	Love and Anarchy	Michelle Krauss	5 episodes
2022	The Playlist	Wife of Per Sundin	1 episode
2025	Tidstjuven	Cindy	
