= Episode 9 =

Episode Nine, Episode 9 or Episode IX may refer to:

- Star Wars: The Rise of Skywalker also known as Star Wars: Episode IX – The Rise of Skywalker, a 2019 film
- "Episode 9" (Twin Peaks)

== See also ==
- Episode 8 (disambiguation)
