= Episode 4 (Humans series 1) =

- Humans episode
- Episode no.: Series 1 Episode 4
- Directed by: Daniel Nettheim
- Written by: Joe Barton
- Original air date: 5 July 2015
- Running time: 47 minutes

Episode chronology
← Previous "Episode 3"	Next → "Episode 5"

"Episode 4" is the fourth episode of the first series of Humans, a show based on Real Humans and co-produced by Channel 4 and AMC. It originally aired in the UK on 5 July 2015. During this episode, Joe has sex with Anita, Mattie meets Leo and Niska narrowly avoids being captured. The episode received positive reviews, garnering 3.95 million UK viewers and 1.05 million US viewers.

== Plot ==
Laura meets a client who thinks synths can feel emotions and deserve human rights; she is intrigued by the idea. Meanwhile, her husband Joe feels lonely while she is away and has sex with Anita.

Mattie meets up with Leo in a café; when Leo claims her synth is called 'Mia' and wants to meet her. She claims to need the toilet and runs away. Max then tells Leo that he has found something in Anita's code: they discover David Elster had left executable code within Mia's programming. They find Doctor Millican, who helps them extract it. Leo connects himself with his laptop and tries to run the program.

Niska finds a "Smash club" where synths are savagely beaten for entertainment and starts attacking the humans there with a baseball bat; she is cornered by police. Leo rings her and says she needs to meet him, because he needs her code. Niska grabs one of the officers and threatens to kill him; the police let her escape.

Laura and Joe take Anita in to be diagnosed and discover she is at least fourteen years old and may have been illegally modified. Meanwhile, Pete Drummond's wife asks him to leave their house for a few days, growing sick of him and increasingly fond of their synth, Simon; Drummond goes to stay with his colleague Karen. Unbeknownst to him, Karen is a synth herself.

== Reception ==
=== Ratings ===
The episode aired in the UK on 5 July 2015 and was watched by 3.95 million households on Channel 4; it was the most watched programme on the channel that week. On Channel 4+1, the show was watched by 0.445 million viewers. In the US, "Episode 4" premiered on 19 July 2015 and received 1.05 million viewers; this is the lowest rating for the series so far.

=== Critical response ===
Gerard O'Donovan wrote in The Telegraph that "The more interesting themes and ideas are struggling to be heard in Channel 4's increasingly opaque drama", and gave the episode a 3 out of 5. Neela Debnath of Express gave the episode a positive review, saying that the show "continues to beguile audiences", "keeps getting better and better" and "put a contemporary twist" on the subject of artificial intelligence. Debnath noted a change in style in this episode, claiming "Humans has suddenly moved from slowburn thriller to post-apocalyptic drama of the Terminator". Morgan Jeffery of Digital Spy complimented the episode, writing that "Humans remains vital, surprising and utterly involving television, delivering game-changing twists and turns by the bucketload." Rob Smedley of Cultbox gave the episode 5 out of 5 stars, calling it "great drama" and "strong storytelling". Michael Noble wrote in Den of Geek that it was the strongest episode yet.
