= Roland Moore =

British screenwriter, playwright and author (born 20th century)

- Occupations: Television writer, playwright, novelist
- Known for: Land Girls; Doctor Who; Humans
- Website: rolandmoore.tv

Roland Moore is an English television writer, playwright and novelist, known as the creator and lead writer of the period-drama series Land Girls for BBC One.

== Career ==
Moore began as a playwright, producing short, low-budget productions. He subsequently moved into television, writing for series, including Smack the Pony, Rastamouse, Peter Rabbit, and became a prolific writer for the soap opera Doctors, writing 48 episodes.

His first feature film, the teen adventure 2: hrs, was crowdfunded on Indiegogo. It is about a teenage boy who discovers he only has a short while to live. It made its debut on video on demand on 30 July 2018.

=== Land Girls ===
The television series Land Girls was conceived by Moore, who wanted to cover the subject matter of the Women's Land Army in an ensemble drama. Once he had the idea, Moore set about creating the characters of Nancy, Joyce, Annie and Bea and devising story ideas from them. Moore named the four main characters after his grandmother and great-aunts, which made the names authentic for the time period. He also read accounts from real-life land girls to make sure his stories were believable.

The BBC announced the commission of Land Girls in June 2009, revealing that the series would air from 7 September 2009 to commemorate the 70th anniversary of the start of the Second World War.

Land Girls won "Best Daytime Programme" at the 2010 Broadcast Awards. Later that year, it was named "Best Drama" at the Royal Television Society Awards. Becci Gemmell won the "Best Newcomer" award, with Sophie Ward and Danny Webb winning the "Best Actress" and "Best Actor" awards, respectively.

The second series began airing from 17 January 2011 and two months later BBC Daytime Controller, Liam Keelan, renewed Land Girls for a third series. It began airing from 7 November 2011.

HarperImpulse, one of HarperCollins UK's digital-first imprints, signed a three-book deal with Moore to bring Land Girls to literary fiction. The first, also Moore's first novel, was Land Girls: The Homecoming in 2017, followed by Land Girls: The Promise in 2018. A third, Christmas on the Home Front, was published in 2019.

=== Humans (Hello An Yi) ===
On 25 July 2018, it was announced Moore would be head writer on a Chinese version of AMC's television series Humans, produced by Endemol Shine China and Croton Media. The series began airing on Chinese broadcasters Tencent Video and iQiyi on February 19, 2021.

=== Fallen ===
On 9 September 2022, it was announced Moore would be co-head writing and producing the romantic fantasy series Fallen, starring Jessica Alexander, Gijs Blom and Alexander Siddig, for Brazilian streaming service Globoplay. It was first aired on Globoplay on 12 August 2024, and later AMC in the US.

=== Big Finish Productions ===
Moore has contributed audio plays for the Big Finish Productions Doctor Who ranges, starting with the Second Doctor release, The Night Witches. It was inspired by the real-life World War Two Russian female flying squadron.

Later plays would include Memories of a Tyrant, Shadow of the Daleks 2 and Colony of Fear, the third-to-last release in the Doctor Who Main Range line. He also wrote for the spin-offs The New Counter-Measures, UNIT, Tales From New Earth and The Robots, as well as acting as a script editor on several releases.

Other than Doctor Who, Moore wrote for multiple series of Big Finish's Survivors range, based on the 1970s BBC television series, created by Terry Nation; Star Cops range, based on the cult 1987 television series created by Chris Boucher, as well as Space 1999 and The Avengers. He wrote an episode for its Big Finish Originals drama, Transference, starring Alex Kingston, Warren Brown and Ingrid Oliver.

=== Other work ===
Moore wrote for the Amazon Prime webseries Cops and Monsters. In March 2021, it was announced Moore was developing a thriller television series for Mopar Studios.

== Teaching ==
Moore has lectured on television screenwriting at Oxford Brookes University and De Montfort University.

== See also ==
- List of English writers
- Lists of screenwriters
