= Being Human (British TV series) series 2 =

Second series of 2009 British supernatural drama programme

Being Human
- Series 2
- Starring: Lenora Crichlow; Russell Tovey; Aidan Turner
- No. of episodes: 8

Release
- Original network: BBC Three
- Original release: 10 January – 28 February 2010

Series chronology
- ← Previous; Series 1 Next → Series 3

Being Human is a British supernatural drama programme created and written by Toby Whithouse for BBC Three. The second series began airing on 10 January 2010 and concluded on 28 February 2010. It follows the lives of a vampire, a werewolf and a ghost who live together and try to integrate themselves into society. It stars Lenora Crichlow as Annie Sawyer, a ghost, Russell Tovey as George Sands, a werewolf, and Aidan Turner as John Mitchell, a vampire.

== Background ==
Series two began filming in August 2009 for airing on 10 January 2010. It was expanded to eight episodes, with series creator Toby Whithouse writing the first two and last two episodes. The cold open sequences followed a new pattern: from episode two onwards each one depicts something from the history of either the main cast or other characters. As with the first series, a single 5-minute prequel was released concerning new characters Ivan and Daisy. BBC America began transmitting Series 2 on 24 July 2010. Richard Wells released the soundtrack consisting of music from both the first and second series.

== Cast ==
=== Main cast ===
- Lenora Crichlow as Annie Sawyer
- Russell Tovey as George Sands
- Aidan Turner as John Mitchell

=== Supporting cast ===
- Donald Sumpter as Patrick Kemp
- Lyndsey Marshal as Lucy Jaggart
- Paul Rhys as Ivan
- Sinéad Keenan as Nina Pickering
- Amy Manson as Daisy Hannigan-Spitari
- Lucy Gaskell as Sam Danson

== Episodes ==
| No. overall | No. in series | Episode | Directed by | Written by | Original release date | UK viewers (millions) |
|---|---|---|---|---|---|---|
| 7 | 1 | Episode 1 | Colin Teague | Toby Whithouse | 10 January 2010 | 1,613,000 |
Two vampires, Ivan and Daisy, arrive in Bristol to torment Mitchell and George over their involvement in Herrick's murder. As George struggles to deal with the blood on his hands, he begins pushing Nina away – and finds himself drawn to Daisy instead. But Nina has her own problems: she too has become a werewolf, after being scratched by George. Meanwhile, Mitchell meets an attractive new doctor named Lucy, and gives her a goldfish. Annie decides to get more involved in the real world, and gets herself a job as a barmaid; and the sinister Kemp continues his investigations into the supernatural: after a fatal experiment on a werewolf, he arranges a visit to the housemates' home…
| 8 | 2 | Episode 2 | Colin Teague | Toby Whithouse | 17 January 2010 | 1,279,000 |
When a bloodied man with suspicious-looking marks on his neck arrives at the hospital, Mitchell has a blast from the past when his old friend Carl returns in urgent need of help. Lucy's curiosity threatens to expose the underground vampire world, and as a result Mitchell agrees to help Carl. Nina continues to struggle with the new direction her life has taken, and despite their best efforts her relationship with George continues to bear the strain. Annie continues to bond with Saul, much to Hugh's annoyance, but something from Saul's past threatens more than their relationship. All the while, the friends' every word is being monitored, but what will be done with the information being collected?
| 9 | 3 | Episode 3 | Colin Teague | Lucy Catherine | 24 January 2010 | 1,207,000 |
With the vampires out of control and openly preying on humans, Mitchell is forced to impose order amongst the undead community of Bristol – and soon finds himself lauded as 'the new Herrick'. Manically depressed from Nina's departure, George takes his mind off things by helping Annie in her mission to reunite her former boss, Hugh, with the love of his life, Kirsty; however, their attempts at playing Cupid only serve to remind George of the loss he is feeling. Mitchell and Lucy go on a date, but their evening ends in disaster. Nina makes a fateful decision, and then meets Kemp's boss…
| 10 | 4 | Episode 4 | Kenny Glanaan | Jamie Mathieson | 31 January 2010 | 1,105,000 |
Annie is attacked by the ghost of a murder victim, who tries to pull her through another door; however, she is saved by the timely intervention of another ghost, an enigmatic airman named Sykes, who offers to show her the true extent of her powers, and a way to fight off the forces of the afterlife. After discovering the joys of lists, George gets a new job as an English tutor for foreign students; he soon meets a new girlfriend – and a new enemy. Mitchell turns to Ivan for help in running an addicts group for the vampire community. Professor Jaggat and Kemp experiment on Nina. George buys tranquilisers and a cage to keep his lycanthropy under control, but the suppression of his werewolf nature causes him to manifest the creature's violent nature in his everyday life…
| 11 | 5 | Episode 5 | Kenny Glanaan | Tony Basgallop | 7 February 2010 | 1,230,000 |
Mitchell is getting closer to Lucy and she, in turn, is struggling to contain her feelings for Mitchell. Mitchell has only really fallen in love once before and, in a flashback to the Sixties, viewers learn how his relationship with Josie saved him from the excesses of vampiredom. Back in the present with Lucy, it's clear he's struggling to reconcile the difference between human love and vampire lust. Meanwhile, George's relationship with Sam and her daughter, Molly, is going well and George wonders if there might be a chance to make the most of this normal human relationship – could he become Molly's step-father? Annie experiences maternal feelings of her own when she's asked to babysit an unusual child...
| 12 | 6 | Episode 6 | Charles Martin | Lisa McGee | 14 February 2010 | 902,000 |
Annie befriends the psychic Alan Cortez who lost most of his "sixth sense" in an accident and has been unable to communicate with spirits since then. His once awful stage show now serves to help ghosts send their final messages to loved ones - something Annie does as well when her mother attends the show. George's relationship with Sam gets more serious, but when a parent-teacher night falls on a full moon, it forces George to lie about his plans to cover up his secret. Mitchell plans to leave the coven to start a life with Lucy, but unbeknownst to him Lucy helps Kemp stage an explosion in the funeral parlor, killing most of the vampires.
| 13 | 7 | Episode 7 | Charles Martin | Toby Whithouse | 21 February 2010 | 1,087,000 |
Mitchell and Daisy, the sole survivors of the explosion, try to get to the bottom of who was responsible. When Mitchell discovers that Lucy was behind it, he goes berserk and vows retaliation. Nina returns, and offers George a chance at a cure. George initially refuses, but changes his tune when a confusion of time causes him to begin his transformation in public, frightening Molly in the process. Annie also seeks the help of Kemp to cross over, but his methods prove to be quite time-consuming if not utterly pointless.
| 14 | 8 | Episode 8 | Charles Martin | Toby Whithouse | 28 February 2010 | 1,231,000 |
Mitchell goes on the search for George and Annie, killing anyone who gets in his way, meanwhile Annie is dragged through "Death's door" through Kemp killing the psychic in order to make a doorway. George and Nina then escape with Mitchell to the countryside. Three weeks later Lucy turns up and is killed by Kemp. Just before Kemp goes to kill Nina, George and Mitchell, Annie appears through Lucy's door and pulls Kemp with her back through the door. Annie then appears on a television from the netherworld and explains what is going on. The episode ends with Daisy and Cara participating in a blood ritual in order to resurrect Herrick.

== Reception ==
The second series of Being Human received generally positive reviews. On review aggregator Rotten Tomatoes, the first series has an approval rating of 100% based on 7 reviews, with an average rating of 8 out of 10. The second series of Being Human also received positive reviews on Metacritic, scoring 78 out of 100, indicating "generally favourable reviews". At the 2010 BAFTA Awards, Being Human was nominated for Best Drama Series. Richard Wells was also nominated for "Best Original Television Music" at the 2010 BAFTA Craft Awards.
