= Lewis Arnold (director) =

English television director

Lewis Arnold is an English director working in television. He is best known for the shows Time, Sherwood and Des.

== Early life and education ==
Lewis Arnold studied at the University of Gloucestershire and graduated in 2007 with a first class honours degree in video production.

He later earned an MA in directing fiction at the National Film and Television School, Buckinghamshire, graduating in 2013.

== Television ==
After graduating with his MA in 2013, Arnold embarked on his first TV project, directing two episodes of the final series of BAFTA-winning channel 4 show, Misfits. He then directed the first four episodes of Russell T Davies’s new E4 show, Banana, and was named a Broadcast Magazine Hot Shot 2014 for his work on both shows.

In 2015, he directed two episodes of Channel 4/AMC series Humans, which became Channel 4's most successful original drama in over 20 years. A second series was commissioned and a year later he returned to direct the opening block. He followed this up by directing an episode of British crime drama Broadchurch for Sister Pictures.

In 2019/20, Arnold co-created and directed the ITV miniseries Des. The series was well received by critics and described as a "sensitive, finely worked drama showing the unrelentingly bleak reality of the monstrous narcissist". David Tennant's performance was considered "one of his best in an impeccable career" earning him a National Television Award for Best Dramatic Performance and an International Emmy for Best Performance by an Actor in 2021. The premiere episode had consolidated viewing figures of 11.4 million viewers, a benchmark previously hit in 2019 with Cleaning Up, a project Arnold developed with writer Mark Marlow and Sister Pictures.

In 2020/21, Arnold directed Jimmy McGovern's Time, a three-part prison drama for BBC One. The drama starred Sean Bean and Stephen Graham and was aired June 2021. The show was widely praised for its authenticity and central performances. Lucy Mangan wrote for The Guardian: "The performances of Bean and Graham are, even though we have come to expect brilliance from them both, astonishing. So, too, are those from everyone in smaller roles, none of which is underwritten or sketchy, and who thicken the drama into something more profoundly moving and enraging at every turn." Billie Schwab Dunn, writing for Metro, praised the show, saying: "Time is a necessary lesson on the British prison system and a masterclass in acting." The show was nommiated for six BAFTA Craft and Television 2022 Awards. The show went onto to win Best Mini-Series and Best Actor for Sean Bean.

In 2021, Arnold directed James Graham's Sherwood for BBC One. The show starred Lesley Manville, David Morrissey and Adeel Akhtar who won the 2023 BAFTA for Best Supporting Actor for his role as Andy Fisher. Sherwood was described as "an adeptly executed crime drama, driven by tight, deliberate plotting, genuinely unforeseen turns, and a palpable friction between its two detective protagonists.”

In 2022/23, Arnold directed all seven episodes of George Kay's The Long Shadow for ITV.

== Short films ==
On graduating from university in 2007, Arnold was awarded two consecutive digital short commissions through the UKFC and Screen WM. His film Stained, written by Ronnie Thompson and starring Ricci Harnet, Frank Harper and Craig Conway was selected for numerous film festivals, leading to nominations at the Midland Royal Television Society Awards for Best New Talent, Best Short Film and Best Director.

Whilst at the National Film and Television School, Arnold's short film Echo written by James Walker and starring Lauren Carse and Oliver Woolford screened at a host of international film festivals including Rotterdam International Film Festival, picking up awards including a National Film Award for Best Short in 2015. The film "centres on an outstanding performance from young lead Lauren Carse and a subtle, yet powerful story."

His NFTS graduation film Charlie Says, written by Frances Poletti and produced by Rob Darnell, premiered at the Edinburgh International Film Festival in 2013. Based on an incident Arnold had on a childhood holiday, the film centres around themes of deceit and masculinity. It stars Elliott Tittensor and Christine Bottomley, as well as a thirteen-year-old Conner Chapman in his debut performance.

== Directors Now ==
In 2020, Arnold created and wrote Directors Now, a free online resource and downloadable book. The document contains the breakout stories of over a hundred, working directors, across a variety of disciplines including TV, film, animation, documentary and commercials, created for aspiring filmmakers during the COVID-19 pandemic.

== Filmography ==
=== Television ===
- The Hack (2025)
- The Long Shadow (2023)
- Sherwood (2022)
- Time (2021)
- Des (2020)
- Dark Money (2019)
- Cleaning Up (2019)
- Broadchurch (2017)
- Humans (2016) (2014)
- Prey II (2015)
- Banana (2014)
- Misfits (2013)

=== Short films ===
- Sunday, Sunday (2017)
- Charlie Says (2013)
- Echo (2013)
- Stained (2010)
