= Jonathan Brackley and Sam Vincent =

British television writers and producers

Jonathan Brackley and Sam Vincent are a duo of British television screenwriters and producers, best known as the creators of AMC's Humans.

Having met at school in the 1990s at age 11, Brackley and Vincent made various shorts and studied film at university. They entered the television industry through separate means, reuniting with the same agent. They began in sketch writing and comedy, contributing material to series such as Balls of Steel (2006), The Wrong Door (2008) and The Wall (2008). They expanded to drama series, writing several episodes of the spy series Spooks, took over as head writers for the last two years of the series, and in 2015, wrote the feature film Spooks: The Greater Good.

Shortly after, the duo created the science fiction drama Humans. It was based on the Swedish science fiction drama Real Humans. The series was announced in April 2014 as part of a partnership between Channel 4 and Xbox Entertainment Studios. However, after Microsoft closed Xbox Entertainment Studios, AMC came aboard as partners to Channel 4. Filming commenced in the autumn of 2014, with the series premiering on 14 June 2015. The series's budget was £12 million. It was a success, however cancelled after three series.

In 2023, BBC One aired their crime thriller series Better, about a corrupt police officer who attempts to turn her life around, only for it to get much worse.

Their upcoming series is The Lords' Day, based on the novel of the same name by Michael Dobbs, starring Damson Idris. The series will premiere on Netflix.
