= Humans (TV series) =

2015 science fiction TV series

- Title card for the second series
- Genre: Science fiction
- Created by: Jonathan Brackley; Sam Vincent
- Based on: Real Humans by Lars Lundström
- Starring: Emily Berrington; Ruth Bradley; Lucy Carless; Gemma Chan; Pixie Davies; Jack Derges; Sope Dirisu; Rebecca Front; Tom Goodman-Hill; Jill Halfpenny; Ivanno Jeremiah; Neil Maskell; Colin Morgan; Katherine Parkinson; Theo Stevenson; Will Tudor; Danny Webb; William Hurt; Marshall Allman; Sonya Cassidy; Carrie-Anne Moss
- Theme music composer: Cristobal Tapia de Veer
- Composers: Cristobal Tapia de Veer; Sarah Warne
- Countries of origin: United Kingdom; United States
- Original language: English
- No. of series: 3
- No. of episodes: 24 (list of episodes)

Production
- Executive producers: Jonathan Brackley; Jane Featherstone; Lars Lundström; Sam Vincent; Derek Wax; Henrik Widman
- Producer: Chris Fry
- Production locations: London, England, UK
- Cinematography: Stuart Bentley; David Rom
- Running time: 46 minutes
- Production companies: Kudos; AMC Studios

Original release
- Network: Channel 4; AMC
- Release: 14 June 2015 – 5 July 2018

Humans is a science fiction television series that debuted in June 2015 on Channel 4 and on AMC. Created by Jonathan Brackley and Sam Vincent, based on the Swedish science fiction drama Real Humans, the series explores the themes of artificial intelligence, robotics, and their effects on the future of humanity, focusing on the social, cultural, and psychological impact of the invention and marketing of anthropomorphic robots called "synths". The series is produced jointly by Channel 4 and Kudos in the United Kingdom, and AMC in the United States.

Eight episodes were produced for the first series which aired between 14 June and 2 August 2015. The second eight-episode series was broadcast in the UK between 30 October and 18 December 2016. A third series was commissioned in March 2017 and aired eight episodes between 17 May and 5 July 2018. In May 2019, Channel 4 announced that the series had been cancelled.

== Premise ==
The series focuses on the social, cultural, and psychological impact of the invention of anthropomorphic robots called "synths". It explores a number of science fiction themes, including artificial intelligence, consciousness, human-robot interaction, superintelligence, mind uploading and the laws of robotics.

== Cast ==
=== Main ===
==== Introduced in series 1 ====
- Emily Berrington as Niska Elster, a conscious synth built by David Elster to be Leo's sister, assigned to work as a prostitute when they were separated. She is violent and resentful of humans and wishes to live her own life, but later starts to care about humans.
- Ruth Bradley as Karen Voss, a detective inspector and the partner of Detective Sergeant Pete Drummond. Those around her have not discovered that she is a conscious synth and was created by David Elster to replace his deceased wife, Beatrice.
- Lucy Carless as Mattie Hawkins, Laura and Joe's teenage daughter, who is upset that her family is falling apart and angry at the emerging role of synths in society. Despite her own intelligence, she feels useless, claiming that synths will soon be able to do anything she can do. She is skilled in computer programming and hacking.
- Gemma Chan as Anita Hawkins / Mia Elster, a servile synth belonging to the Hawkins family. She was sold as new, but is actually Mia, a conscious synth built by David Elster to be Leo's babysitter, kidnapped and hacked with new software.
- Pixie Davies as Sophie Hawkins, Laura and Joe's younger daughter. She names the new family synth Anita after a friend of hers who has moved away, and develops a strong affection for the synth.
- Jack Derges as Simon (series 1), Jill Drummond's attractive synth caregiver and physiotherapist. Pete is dissatisfied with Simon, thinking that he is his replacement.
- Sope Dirisu as Fred Elster (series 1), a conscious synth built by David Elster to be a brother to Leo. Professor Hobb likens Fred to the Mona Lisa in terms of the complexity of his design.
- Rebecca Front as Vera (series 1), a medical synth from the NHS who is supposed to replace Odi as George Millican's caregiver. Millican is frustrated with her relentlessly officious and domineering manner, and generally refuses her help.
- Tom Goodman-Hill as Joe Hawkins, Laura's husband. He bought Anita because he felt Laura's absence caused a void, and he needed help managing their family.
- Jill Halfpenny as Jill Drummond (series 1), Pete's disabled wife. She is dissatisfied with Pete.
- Ivanno Jeremiah as Max Elster, Leo Elster's conscious synth confidant, built by David Elster to be a brother to Leo.
- Neil Maskell as Pete Drummond (series 1–2), an unhappy Special Technologies Task Force detective sergeant who has always been suspicious of synths. He is partnered with Karen Voss. By the second series, Pete and Jill have separated and Pete is shown to be involved with Karen despite his knowledge of her true nature.
- Colin Morgan as Leo Elster, son of David Elster, a part-synth fugitive believed by the rest of the world to have died in a car accident; he was in a fatal accident as a child and his father developed synth components to cope with the damage to his brain.
- Katherine Parkinson as Laura Hawkins, a lawyer and mother of three who feels uncomfortable around synths. She had concerns about Anita and sought to find out more about her.
- Theo Stevenson as Toby Hawkins, Laura and Joe's teenage son, who is attracted to, and becomes protective of, Anita.
- Will Tudor as Odi (series 1–2), George Millican's malfunctioning synth caregiver. He is prone to system glitches, though Millican is unwilling to recycle him or return him to the NHS.
  - Tudor also portrays V (series 3), an artificial intelligence developed by Athena Morrow based on her deceased daughter Virginia.
- Danny Webb as Edwin Hobb (series 1–2), an artificial intelligence researcher. He is simultaneously concerned about and intrigued by the possibility of conscious synthetics. Hobb is a key player in the quiet government investigation to find the four synths deemed a threat.
- William Hurt as George Millican (series 1), a retired artificial intelligence researcher and widower who suffers memory loss and physical disabilities secondary to a stroke. He forms a special bond with his outdated caregiver synth named Odi. He previously worked with Leo's father.
- Manpreet Bachu as Harun Khan (series 1), a friend of Mattie, who helps her hack the synths.

==== Introduced in series 2 ====
- Marshall Allman as Milo Khoury (series 2), a techno-entrepreneur and owner of Qualia, a synth research corporation, who seeks to harness the sentient synthetics for himself.
- Sonya Cassidy as Hester (series 2), a synth who becomes self-aware from the consciousness program unleashed across the world. She is rescued from a synth-laboured facility by Leo and Max, but soon starts to exhibit disturbing behaviour.
- Carrie-Anne Moss as Athena Morrow (series 2), an AI researcher based in San Francisco who has been invited to reverse engineer the consciousness program.
- Thusitha Jayasundera as Neha Patel (series 2), a government lawyer with initially a hostile stance towards the synth cause.
- Billy Jenkins as Seraph Sam (series 3; recurring series 2)

==== Introduced in series 3 ====
- Holly Earl as Agnes (series 3), a synth in Mia and Max's group. She is suspicious of their leadership and sympathizes with the terrorists.
- Ukweli Roach as Anatole (series 3), a former courtesan synth who believes in a higher power, namely David Elster, and that synths were always meant to be given consciousness.
- Mark Bonnar as Neil Sommer (series 3), a charming scientist on a government commission with whom Laura develops a strong personal connection.
- Dino Fetscher as Stanley (series 3), an "orange-eyed" synth given to a reluctant Laura by the Dryden commission group as her personal synth and protector.
- Phil Dunster as Tristan (series 3)

=== Recurring ===
- Ellen Thomas as Lindsey Kiwanuka
- Jonathan Aris as Robert
- Stephen Boxer as David Elster, Leo's father and the creator of the conscious synths
- Spencer Norways as young Leo Elster
- Letitia Wright as Renie (series 2), a human who lives as if she were a synth
- Bella Dayne as Astrid, a waitress who becomes romantically involved with Niska
- Ritu Arya as Flash (series 2–3), a house synth who, like Hester, becomes self-aware from the consciousness program.
- Sam Palladio as Ed (series 2–3), Mia's employer, with whom she forms a special bond. He is the owner of a beachside cafe.
- Akie Kotabe as Ji Dae-Sun
- Matthew Marsh as Lord Dryden

== Episodes ==
Series	Episodes	Originally released (UK)		Avg. UK viewers (millions)	Avg. US viewers (millions)
Series	Episodes	First released	Last released	Avg. UK viewers (millions)	Avg. US viewers (millions)
1	8	14 June 2015	2 August 2015	4.12	1.18
2	8	30 October 2016	18 December 2016	1.93	0.47
3	8	17 May 2018	5 July 2018	1.05	0.35

== Production ==
=== Development ===
The series was announced in April 2014 as part of a partnership between Channel 4 and Xbox Entertainment Studios. However, after Microsoft closed Xbox Entertainment Studios, AMC came aboard as partners to Channel 4. Filming commenced in the autumn of 2014, with the series premiering on 14 June 2015. The series' budget was £12 million.

The commissioning of a second, eight-episode series to air in 2016 was announced 31 July 2015. Gemma Chan had previously said, in an interview with Den of Geek, that the first series is "not completely tied up at the end" and "there are definitely still areas to be explored for a second series." Similarly, C4's Head of International Drama, Simon Maxwell, told Broadcast's Talking TV podcast that: "We've got a story that is told over a great many episodes and is very much designed to come back and return. We'll be following those characters on a really epic journey." Filming of the second series began on 11 April 2016, with a premiere date of 30 October 2016.

A third series was commissioned in March 2017 and premiered in the UK on 17 May 2018, and in the United States on 5 June 2018. By August 2018, discussions were ongoing about a possible fourth series. Channel 4 announced in May 2019 that there would not be a fourth series.

=== Filming ===
During rehearsals, Gemma Chan and her fellow robot actors were sent to a "synth school" run by the show's choreographer, Dan O'Neill, in a bid to rid themselves of any human physical gestures and become convincing synths. "It was about stripping back any physical tics you naturally incorporate into performance", explains Chan, who adds that it was a "relief to go home and slouch" after a day on set.

Katherine Parkinson began filming six weeks after giving birth to her second child; her part in the series was filmed on 10 separate days, between 10 days' rest.

A number of scenes for the second series were filmed in Thanet, Kent. The production team used Botany Bay and West Bay as filming locations, while shots of the farm and fields overlooking the factory were filmed in Dagnall. The scenes were predominantly centred on Anita at work.

== Broadcast and release ==
The first episode of the series was broadcast in the UK on Channel 4 on 14 June 2015 and premiered in the United States and Canada on AMC on 28 June 2015. It started airing in Australia on ABC2, on 3 August 2015. It was shown on TV3 in New Zealand from 11 August 2015.

The second series premiered in the United Kingdom on 30 October 2016, in Australia the day after and premiered in the United States on 13 February 2017.

=== Marketing ===
For one week in May 2015, the series was marketed using a fake shopfront for Persona Synthetics on London's Regent Street, inviting passers-by to create their own synth using interactive screens, and employing actors who pretended to be synths around central London. An accompanying Channel 4 trailer for the series in the style of an advertisement for Persona featured "Sally", a robotic servant described as "your new best friend". In addition, website banner advertisements appeared on the eBay UK website leading to an eBay "buy it now" listing for a Persona Synthetics Robot.

=== Home media ===
Channel 4 DVD released the first series on DVD in the UK on 17 August 2015. Spirit Entertainment released the second series on DVD in the UK on 16 January 2017. Spirit Entertainment released the third series on DVD in the UK on 29 January 2019.

In Region 1, Acorn Media has released all three seasons on DVD and Blu-ray. Humans – Season 1: Uncut UK Edition was released on 29 March 2016. Humans – Season 2: Uncut UK Edition was released on 31 October 2017. Humans – Season 3.0: Uncut UK Edition was released on 29 January 2019. Acorn Media released Humans: Complete Collection containing all three seasons on Blu-ray on 5 May 2020. As of 2023, the first through third seasons are available in Region 1 for purchase on Apple TV.

== Reception ==
The first season of Humans received positive reviews from critics. Review aggregator website Rotten Tomatoes gave the season an 89% based on 62 reviews, with an average rating of 7.3/10. The site's critical consensus reading: "Humans is a mature, high-octane thriller offering emotional intrigue and thought-provoking suspense that should prove irresistible to sci-fi fans while remaining accessible enough to lure in genre agnostics." Metacritic gave the season a rating of 76 out of 100, based on 33 critics, indicating "generally favorable reviews".

The second season received critical acclaim. On Rotten Tomatoes, the season has a score of 94%, based on 17 reviews, with an average rating of 7.8/10. The site's critical consensus reads, "Humans continues to quietly distinguish itself in the sci-fi drama category – and prove better than most of its flashier AI competition." On Metacritic, the season has a rating of 82 out of 100, based on 8 reviews, indicating "universal acclaim".

The third season received critical acclaim. On Rotten Tomatoes, the season has a score of 100%, based on 13 reviews, with an average rating of 6.0/10. The site's critical consensus reads, "Humans gains new sociopolitical dimensions in its third season, mining deeper insight from its sci-fi premise without diluting the potency of its well-drawn characters."

The show is Channel 4's highest rated drama since the 1992 programme The Camomile Lawn. It has been described as having "universal appeal" and as being "one of 2015's dramatic hits". The show has been described as "a bit dystopian and Black Mirror-esque". A review in the Telegraph praised the show's performances but said that the story is "conceptually ... old hat" and "wasn't breaking any new ground philosophically".

In December 2015, Humans was voted Digital Spy's "Top Show of 2015", described as managing "to stand out as something totally different in a TV landscape awash with cop shows and crime thrillers ... And its fearlessness, its creativity and its quality all deserve to be recognised."

== Accolades ==
Year	Award	Category	Nominee(s)	Result	Ref.
2015	British Screenwriters' Awards	Best British TV Drama Writing	Joe Barton, Jonathan Brackley, Sam Vincent and Emily Ballou	Won	
2015	Royal Television Society: Craft and Design Awards	Design Titles	Momoco	Won	
2015	Royal Television Society: Craft and Design Awards	Trails & Packaging	4Creative	Nominated	
2016	BAFTA	Audience Award	Humans	Nominated	
2016	BAFTA	Television: Drama Series	Humans	Nominated	
2016	BAFTA	Television Craft: Digital Creativity	Development Team	Won	
2016	BAFTA	Television Craft: Editing – Fiction	Daniel Greenway	Nominated	
2016	Broadcast Awards	Best Drama Series or Serial	Humans	Nominated	
2016	Broadcasting Press Guild Awards	Best Actress	Gemma Chan	Nominated	
2016	Broadcasting Press Guild Awards	Best Drama Series	Humans	Nominated	
2016	Broadcasting Press Guild Awards	Breakthrough Award	Gemma Chan	Nominated	
2016	National Television Awards	New Drama	Humans	Nominated	
2016	Royal Television Society: Programme Awards	Best Drama Series	Humans	Nominated	
2016	Satellite Awards	Best Genre Series	Humans	Nominated	
2016	South Bank Sky Arts Awards	Best TV Drama	Humans	Nominated	
2016	Televisual Bulldog Awards	Best Drama Series	Humans	Won	

== Chinese adaptation ==
On 25 July 2018, it was announced Roland Moore would be head writer on a Chinese version of Humans in Mandarin called 你好，安怡 / Nǐ hǎo, ān yí (Hello An Yi), produced by Endemol Shine China and Croton Media. The series was released on iQIYI on 19 February 2021 and ran for 30 episodes.

== See also ==
- Better than Us
- List of fictional robots and androids
