= Real Humans =

2012 Swedish science fiction TV series

- Genre: Drama; Science fiction
- Created by: Lars Lundström
- Written by: Lars Lundström; Alex Haridi
- Directed by: Harald Hamrell; Levan Akin; Kristina Humle; Christian Eklöw; Christopher Panov
- Composer: Rikard Borggård
- Country of origin: Sweden
- Original language: Swedish
- No. of seasons: 2
- No. of episodes: 20

Production
- Executive producers: Stefan Baron; Henrik Widman
- Running time: 60 minutes
- Production companies: Sveriges Television (SVT); Matador Film AB

Original release
- Network: Sveriges Television (SVT)
- Release: 22 January 2012 – 2 February 2014

Related
- Humans

Real Humans (Swedish: Äkta människor) is a 2012 Swedish science fiction/drama series set in an alternative near-future version of Sweden where consumer-level humanoid robot workers and servants are widespread. The series follows the resulting emotional effects on two families as well as the trials of a group of robots who have attained free will and want their freedom from human ownership.

It premiered on SVT 1 on 22 January 2012. The show was created by Lars Lundström and the first series was directed by Harald Hamrell and Levan Akin. As of 2013, the series has been sold to about 50 countries, including Australia, France, Germany, and South Korea. A second season of ten episodes premiered on SVT1 in October 2013. In April 2013 it was announced that Lars Lundström was writing a third series, but as of August 2014, SVT has yet to officially announce whether the series will be renewed for a third season. As of November 2014, Lundström said in an interview with Festival Court Métrange, "We have planned for a third season, we have written a whole outline and some scripts, but right now it's in decision making, if it's going to happen or not, because we have problem to fund the budget money. In a couple of weeks, maximum a month, we know, but I'm sorry to say, I'm not very optimistic.".

== Setting ==
The story takes place in a version of present-day Sweden where the use of androids is commonplace. The androids, known as hubots (portmanteau of human and robot), function as servants, workers, companions, and even illicitly as sexual partners, with different models having specific features designed for their distinctive roles. While some people embrace this new technology, others are disturbed by it. A far-right political movement, the "real humans", arises in opposition to the encroachment of hubots upon human society. Some members use the derogatory term "Pacmans" to refer to hubots.

Hubots are usually programmed to recognise and obey their owner and can learn skills and pick up knowledge through observation of humans. Hubots have begun to replace human workers in many industries, especially in the performance of repetitive tasks. Though they are designed to closely resemble humans, hubots are usually easy for humans to recognise as they have bright flawless skin, glossy hair and unnaturally bright (usually very blue or very green) eyes. All Hubots also have a USB-like port, in either the back of the neck or in their lower back, which is used for programming and data. The button to activate or de-power a hubot is located under the left armpit, as is a standard wall plug cord for recharging purposes. Hubots require only electricity to survive and must recharge regularly, during which they enter a sleep-like state. Hubot skin feels similar to human skin and is kept at normal human body temperature, but beneath the skin are metal components and a blue fluid/lubricant known as HubFluid.

Hubots are also programmed to be docile. They obey a set of rules called "Asimov" protocols that prevent them from harming humans. However, some hubots have been modified beyond the legal protocols to function as lovers or bodyguards. Such practices are illegal in Sweden and those who modify the programming of the hubots are known as "home-brewers". A small, low-funded branch of the police is set up to investigate hubot related crimes, known as E-HURB. Hubot-human sexual activity is taboo but not uncommon and many hubots are programmed for limited sexual activity. Those who pursue sexual relationships with hubots are derisively called "Hubbies".

Further, those hubots reprogrammed by original hubot creator David Eischer have started to develop feelings, desires and their own goals, attaining an apparent capacity for free will and independence from humans. Their code is designed to integrate and balance various emotions simultaneously as opposed to the one-emotion-at-a time code that standard hubots have. They are still often naïve and unworldly and sometimes fail to understand the nuances of complex human behaviour.

== Characters ==
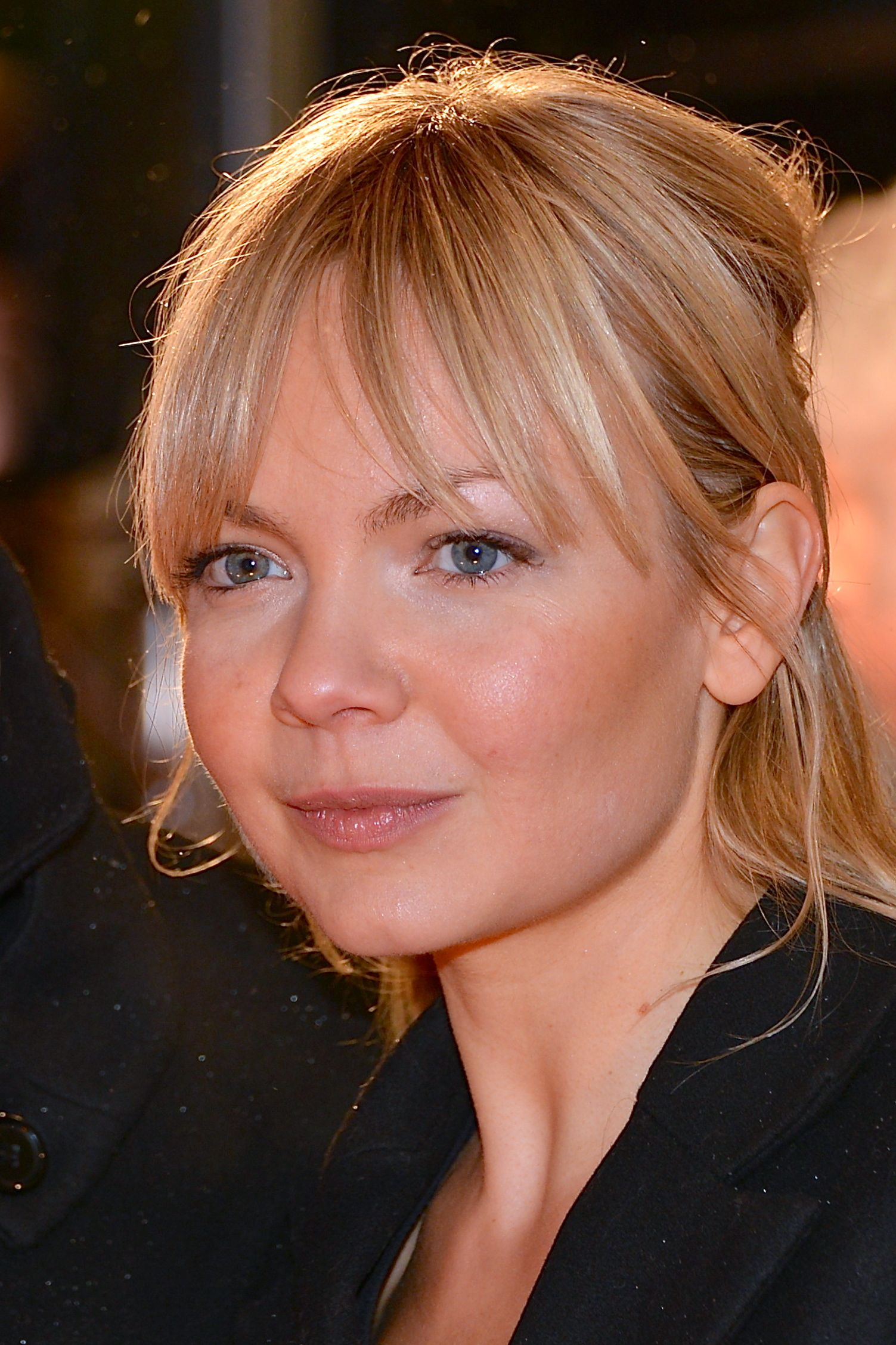
Marie Robertson who plays Bea

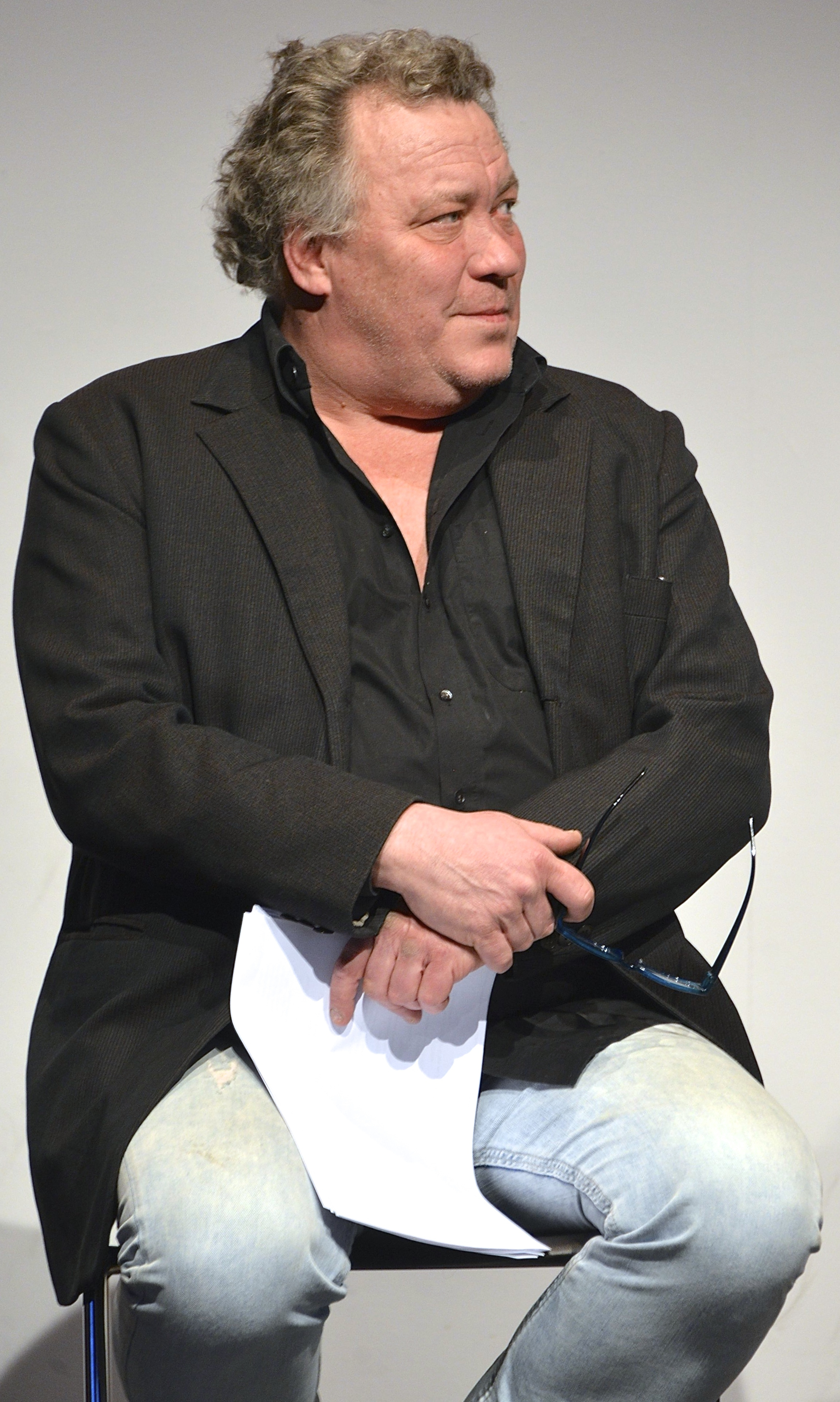
Leif Andrée who plays Roger

=== The Engman Family ===
- Pia Halvorsen, Inger Engman, a mother and lawyer
- Johan Paulsen, Hans Engman, Inger's husband
- Natalie Minnevik, Matilda Engman, the eldest Engman child, who works in a supermarket
- Kåre Hedebrant, Tobias Engman (nicknamed "Tobbe"), a teenage school student
- Aline Palmstierna, Sofia Engman, the youngest Engman daughter
- Sten Elfström, Lennart Sollberg, Inger's father who lives alone with his hubot companion(s)
- Alexander Stocks, Odi, Lennart's much beloved hubot companion
- Anki Larsson, Vera, a less genial hubot designed to look after Lennart's health in old age
- Lisette Pagler, Anita, a hubot that Hans purchases for the family; she has a hidden personality the family discovers.

=== The Children of David Eischer ===
- Andreas Wilson, Leo Eischer, David's son (in flashbacks, 10-year-old Leo is played by Romeo Altera)
- Eva Röse, Niska, David Eischer's main hubot assistant, de facto leader of the "free" hubots
- Marie Robertson, Beatrice "Bea", a free hubot with a past closely tied to Leo's. She has been posing as a human named Beatrice Novak, working as both a detective with E-HURB and an anti-hubot activist.
- Lisette Pagler, Mimi, a hubot with free will that seems to have feelings for Leo
- David Lenneman, Fred, a hubot with free will.
- André Sjöberg, Gordon, a hubot with free will
- Josephine Alhanko, Flash / Florentine, a hubot with free will; in season two, forms an intimate relationship with a human.
- Saunet Sparell, Marylyn, a hubot with free will

=== The Engmans' Neighbours ===
- Leif Andrée, Roger, neighbour of the Engmans, husband of Therese and adoptive father to Kevin. He is a temperamental warehouse worker, and skeptical of hubots.
- Camilla Larsson, Therese, unhappy wife of Roger, mother of Kevin, and attracted to her hubot trainer. She is a friend of Inger's.
- Fredrik Silbersky, Kevin, Therese's son, and an anti-hubot activist.
- Johannes Bah Kuhnke, Rick, Therese's hubot, who has special (illegal) programming allowing greater empathy and simulated emotion than most hubots

=== Other major characters ===
==== Humans ====
- Thomas W. Gabrielsson, David Eischer, Leo's father and the programmer who created the code that allows hubots to attain free will.
- Ola Wahlström, Ove Holm, a male detective with E-HURB
- Jimmy Lindström, Malte Koljonen, a volatile anti-hubot activist
- Anna Sise, Pilar, Therese's best friend who works at a gym
- Måns Nathanaelson, Jonas Boberg, owner of the hubot retail store Hubot Market
- Peter Viitanen, Silas, a thief, trafficker and illegal modifier of hubots
- Sofia Bach, Åsa, the pastor and wife to Eva. She believes the hubots won't harm anyone.
- Ellen Mattsson, Eva, the vicar's wife who is not fond of hubots
- Shebly Niavarani, Henning, Inger Engman's manager at the lawfirm
- Niklas Jarneheim, Magnus, Inger Engman's colleague at the lawfirm
- Karin Bertling, Niska Boberg (in season two), estranged mother of Jonas; an anti-technology recluse with a past connection to David Eischer
- Alexander Karim – Douglas Jarméus, Florentine's husband in season two
- Lars-Erik Berenett – Claes Jarméus – Father of Douglas and owner of Inger's law firm
- Emil Almén – Einar, hubot expert

==== Hubots ====
- Christopher Wagelin, Max, a hubot (handyman model) who assists Leo, and whom Leo has partially liberated from the restrictions of his programming
- Johannes Bah Kuhnke, Rick, Therese's hubot (personal trainer model)
- Rennie Mirro, Bo, Pilar's hubot
- Dan Ekdahl, Arnold, Jonas' hubot
- Jonas Malmsjö, Luther, a hubot Silas and his partner have hacked to act as a security guard
- Louise Peterhoff – Cloette, a hubot taking care of David Eischer's diseased mother

Note: Most actors playing hubots appear in multiple roles in the series (usually non-speaking) as other copies of the same model.

== Episodes ==
| Series | Episodes | Originally released | |
| Series | Episodes | First released | Last released |
|---|---|---|---|
| 1 | 10 | 22 January 2012 | 18 March 2012 |
| 2 | 10 | 1 December 2013 | 2 February 2014 |

=== Series 1 (2012) ===
| No. overall | No. in series | Title | Directed by | Written by | Original release date |
|---|---|---|---|---|---|
| 1 | 1 | "Break In, Break Loose" | Harald Hamrell | Lars Lundström | 22 January 2012 |
An elderly man driving home hits a pedestrian, then discovers that it is a "Hubot", one of a population of intelligent, lifelike humanoid robots that are now commonplace in society. Seeing a group of Hubots approaching, the man panics and returns to his farm, but the Hubots follow, capturing the man and his wife. In the struggle, two of the Hubots are damaged and one of them, Mimi, is seized and taken away by Silas, a black-market Hubot dealer, who has been tracking them in hopes of capturing and selling them. The remaining Hubots, led by a human, Leo Eischer, includes Niska, Fred, Gordon, Flash, Marylyn and Max. Leo instructs the Hubots to hide out at a nearby church, then he leaves with Max to search for Mimi. In his absence, Niska assumes leadership and instructs the others to head for the church, but after they leave she returns to the farm and murders the couple to stop them talking. In the nearby city, Hans Engmann goes to buy a new Hubot for his widowed father-in-law Lennart, to replace Lennart's outdated hubot, Odi. Jonas, the Hub-Market manager (who is in league with Silas) pressures Hans into buying an expensive nurse/housekeeper model, Vera, and clinches the deal by offering Hans an additional free Hubot - Mimi, who has been reprogrammed by Silas and now has no memory of her past life. Hans' lawyer wife Inger reluctantly agrees to try the Hubot, whom they name Anita. Inger insists that Anita be treated as a part of the family, youngest daughter Sofia sees her as a friend, but teenage son Tobias ("Tobbe") soon develops an attraction to Anita. The Engmann's neighbour, Roger, who lives with his partner Therese and stepson Kevin, is resentful of the introduction of Hubots at his workplace, and is further alienated by Therese's handsome Hubot trainer/companion, Rick. The lonely Lennart balks at handing over Odi to be destroyed at a Hubot disposal facility, so he takes him home and hides him in his basement. Later, frustrated by Vera's controlling manner, Lennart secretly reactivates Odi.
| 2 | 2 | "Trust No One" | Harald Hamrell | Lars Lundström | 22 January 2012 |
The episode opens with a flashback to Leo's childhood, involving his father David, and several of the Hubots, including Niska and Fred. In the present, Ove and Bea, officers of the Hubot crime task force E-HURB, investigate the murders of the elderly couple. The Engmanns learn to adapt to Mimi's presence, but Roger's resentment of Hubots grows. During an argument, he hits Therese, who immediately packs up and leaves with Kevin. Meanwhile, Leo leaves Max to venture into the sordid underworld of the Hubot sex trade in search of Mimi. The fugitive Hubots, still on the run, are pursued by E-Hub, and Niska again shows her ruthlessness by killing a police dog that is tracking them. Leo collapses in the toilets of the Hubot sex club, and we discover that he is in fact a human/Hubot hybrid. Therese and Inger dine with Therese's friend Pilar, whose relationship with her Hubot, Bo, has moved to a more intimate level. Leo recovers, and reunites with Max, while the other Hubots reach the church, where they are discovered recharging by the pastor.
| 3 | 3 | "The Lord Shall Be Our Companion" | Harald Hamrell | Lars Lundström | 29 January 2012 |
At the church, Niska convinces Asa, the pastor, to hide them in her attic, but Asa's partner Eva is suspicious of their presence. Leo and Max continue their search for Mimi. The increasingly alienated Roger attends a meeting of a radical anti-Hubot group, "Real Humans", where he meets Malte, an ardent anti-Hubot activist, as well as Bea, the E-HURB officer, who has apparently infiltrated the group. As Mimi becomes part of the Engmann family, Tobbe's attraction to her continues to grow. Bea and Ove, still tracking the renegade Hubots, visit Asa's house, but when Bea investigates the attic and sees Niska, she says nothing to Ove about their presence. Lennart evades Vera, and slips out of the house to take Odi on a fishing trip. As the episode ends Leo experiences another flashback to the crucial event of his childhood - the drowning of his mother, his own near death, and his rescue by Mimi.
| 4 | 4 | "Semi-Human Rights" | Harald Hamrell | Lars Lundström | 5 February 2012 |
Lennart's escapade ends badly when Odi drives recklessly, bringing the police in pursuit. When Odi runs the car off the road, a panicked Lennart sends Odi off to hide in the forest, and Lennart is arrested for dangerous driving. Therese, Rick, Pilar and Bo go on a couples' night-out, but after the Hubots are refused entry to a club, Therese and Pilar hire Inger to act for them in suing the club. Lennart returns to the forest but cannot find Odi, who has wandered away and become lost. Leo continues searching for Mimi in the Hubot underworld, but he collapses again, and we see that the entry site for his charger cord is injured and bleeding. He experiences another flashback to his childhood - Mimi had rescued him from drowning, but he is taken to hospital in a critical condition. Roger tracks down Therese at her new apartment, but they argue, and Roger again loses control and hits Therese. Inger's boss Henning agrees to let her take on Pilar and Therese's case. After Pilar suggests that she can have Bo reprogrammed, Therese visits the same black-market Hubot sex shop where Leo is working. Leo reprograms Rick, removing his Asimov constraints, and enhancing his sexual functions. Roger meets again with Malte and Bea; he learns of Malte's violent outlook, his stash of weapons, and his plan to bomb the Hub-Market, but when Bea leaves the room, it is revealed that she is actually another of the freed Hubots, in disguise. Later Bea secretly meets with Niska to discuss their plans. Leo, now armed with a pistol, tracks Mimi to Silas' workshop and demands to know where Mimi has been taken. Enraged, he suddenly draws his gun and kills Silas' associate, Jim, in cold blood, but he is then seized by Silas' Hubot assistant, who strangles and apparently kills him. As he loses consciousness, there is another flashback to his childhood - after being told that Leo's condition is hopeless, David begs the doctors to save Leo's life with Hubot implants, but they refuse, so David takes Leo away to perform the operation himself.
| 5 | 5 | "Power at Heart" | Levan Akin | Lars Lundström | 12 February 2012 |
Therese and Rick's romance blossoms, but Kevin is alienated by their behaviour. A mysterious government intelligence agent visits Jonas, and interrogates him about the "freed" Hubots, and the rumour that Leo's father, David Eischer, created a programming code that gives Hubots free will. Bea and Niska continue to communicate secretly about their plans via an internet dating site. The intelligence officer meets Ove and orders him to surrender all of E-HURB's files on the Hubot murders. Odi, now in Silas' possession, is re-programmed to recognise Silas as his owner. Asa and Eva argue over hiding the Hubots, while the Hubots themselves argue over whether they should leave, or wait for Leo. Silas orders his Hubots to dismember and dispose of the bodies of Jim and Leo, but then discovers that Leo is a hybrid, and is still alive. Therese and Rick go shopping, but Rick begins to show that he now has a will of his own. Mathilde questions Anita/Mimi about her past, and discovers an alternate 'unknown' operating system in her software - when she reactivates it, Mimi regains her full memory and identity as a freed Hubot. Silas orders his Hubots to kill and dismember Leo, but while he is berating Leo he reveals that he sold Mimi to Jonas' Hub-Market. Just as the Hubots are about to start their grisly task, Jonas arrives unexpectedly, and Leo is able to escape. Bea, who has been 'squatting' in an unoccupied apartment, copies the Eischer code onto a USB stick. Leo reunites with Max and goes to the Hub-Market, where he confronts Jonas, forcing him to reveal that Mimi was sold to the Engmanns. While they are talking, Malte and Roger arrive at the Hub-Market and plant the bomb, which explodes just after Leo leaves the building. Mimi tells Mathilde that the 'tattoo' on her arm means she is one of the 'children' of David Eischer, whom she calls "our liberator".
| 6 | 6 | "Sly Leo" | Levan Akin | Lars Lundström | 19 February 2012 |
In the wake of the Hub-Market bombing, Jonas has survived, but he is horribly burned. Malte calls the media to claim responsibility in the name of the "Real Humans Liberation Front". Leo almost makes it to the Engmann home, but in his weakened state he collapses in the street, only metres from the house. Bea meets with Niska, who tells her that the vital final part of the Eischer code stored as audio information in Leo's "bio brain", and in an ironic twist, while they talk, they drive right past the stricken Leo without recognising him, and the next morning Leo is found and taken to hospital. After reading a bible Asa has given him, Gordon discusses his spiritual aspirations with her, but Flash upsets Eva when she sees a photo of Eva and Asa's wedding and abuses her as a "homo freak". Lennart attends an art class, where he meets a vivacious older lady. When the doctors discover Leo's hybrid nature, the intelligence agency takes him into custody and begin interrogating him. Niska forces Flash to apologise to Eva for her insult. At E-HURB headquarters, Ove examines the remains of Max, who has been destroyed in the explosion. When Bea arrives, she gives Ove the robot-shaped USB stick with the copy of the Eischer code, ostensibly as a birthday present. When Ove leaves the lab, Bea uses a taser to destroy Max's brain, but then Ove returns unexpectedly and discovers Bea recharging, and with her cover now blown she is forced to overpower Ove and escape. Therese and Pilar abandon their lawsuit after they learn that the defence team will insist that Rick and Bo are checked for illegal modifications. Lennart suffers a heart attack, but he is saved by Vera. Following a series of confrontations with Eva, Gordon and Niska, Flash leaves the group. Bea meets with Roger and gains his confidence by pretending she has just ended an abusive relationship, and that she has romantic feelings for him. At the hospital, Lennart is told that his insurance includes the right to have a digital "clone" made of his personality, which can be installed into a Hubot in the event of his death. When Roger and Bea return home, they discover that Malte is beginning to crack, and he threatens them with a gun. Tobbe breaks down and confesses to Hans about his feelings for Mimi. Disturbed by the Hubots' continued presence, Eva tries to call the police, but she is stopped by Niska, who threatens to kill her, and Eva runs away in terror. Gordon attends a church service but he is thrown out of the church by the enraged congregation, so he rejoins the other Hubots, and they flee.
| 7 | 7 | "Blind Love" | Levan Akin | Lars Lundström | 26 February 2012 |
| 8 | 8 | "Make Haste" | Levan Akin | Lars Lundström | 4 March 2012 |
| 9 | 9 | "Heritage" | Harald Hamrell | Lars Lundström | 11 March 2012 |
Alerted by Malte's mother, special forces await him in his flat, but he hides in the cellar instead, where he is murdered by Niska. Bea describes her vision of the future with hubots as immortal and eventually only race, and offers Roger to join them. Therese is concerned about a despondent Rick, to the disgust of Kevin, who leaves to reunite with Roger. The secret service has analyzed Inger's recording of her conversation with Leo and decide to abduct Mimi. Inger meets Mimi's personality and hands her Leo's message. Leo's doctor resolves to spring him out of prison and fakes the surveillance video feed into the director's office. The director demands Leo's secret code and threatens him with death. It is revealed that the code is the final sequence of the program that gives David's children their special abilities, which he gave to Leo alone to protect it from disclosure. Tobias is diagnosed by his therapist as being trans-human-sexual. Therese sells Rick to Silas in an attempt to win back Kevin. Inger and Hans quarrel about her commitment to hubot rights. Mimi disappears from the Engmans' home. Niska and Bea bribe Ola for information about Leo's location, but afterwards, rather than kill Ola, Bea shoots Niska.
| 10 | 10 | "The Code" | Harald Hamrell | Lars Lundström | 18 March 2012 |
Bea and Niska meet with Ove, bribing him to obtain his security pass so they can rescue Leo, but the meeting ends unexpectedly when Bea shoots Niska in the head, destroying her brain. Flash leaves the group, disguises herself as a human and resolves to meet a human man and forge a new life for herself. Surveillance cameras help the intelligence agent to catch up to Mimi and Leo in the underground railway tunnel, where they are hiding. Leo begs Mimi to help him die, but the agent arrives before she has finished, and Mimi is forced to flee. While the agent pursues Mimi, Bea arrives to find Leo, asking him to whisper the final part of the code to her. She then shoots him dead, perhaps at his request, but we don't know whether or not he gave her the code. At that moment the intelligence agent arrives back and confronts Bea. She offers to give him the hard drive containing the main part of the code, drops it to distract him, and whilst the agent's guard is down she draws her pistol and they exchange gunfire. The agent is killed and Bea damaged. Bea sees the hard drive was damaged in the fight, apparently beyond repair, so she drops it and vanishes.

=== Series 2 (2013–14) ===
| No. overall | No. in series | Title | Directed by | Written by | Original release date |
|---|---|---|---|---|---|
| 11 | 1 | "Episode 1" | Harald Hamrell | Lars Lundström | 1 December 2013 |
The story picks up six months after Leo's death: Tobbe's inadvertent opening of the Eischer Code has released the incomplete code onto the internet, where it acts like a malware virus, infecting Hubots and causing serious malfunctions. Inger meets with a government official, who asserts that the Eischer Code does not exist, and Inger is forced to acquiesce to the government's sanitised version of the events surrounding Leo's imprisonment and death. On her way home, Inger witnesses the effect of the virus first-hand, when a Hubot violently malfunctions on a train. Flash starts a relationship with a human named Douglas, but it gets off to a rocky start when Douglas' ex-wife arrives. A pair of railway maintenance workers find Bea's inactive body in a railway tunnel, where she had fallen after being shot by the agent, but when they reactivate her, she brutally slays them both and escapes. Roger, now jobless, spots a "help wanted" ad for a new business. Silas is released from prison after serving time for the extortion attempt and reunites with Jonas. They return to Silas' workshop to find Odi still waiting for them. Bea visits Ove's home in search of the USB stick, but Ove's wife recognises Bea, so she kills Ove's wife and son to avoid detection. Jonas introduces Silas to his new business, Hub Battle Land, a battle simulation game where humans compete against Hubots, and Silas puts Odi to work as the receptionist. Kevin becomes more involved with the Real Humans group, for whom Eva is also now working, and Kevin is attracted to one of the girls in the group. Jonas purchases a Hubot clone of himself, and sets up a computer lab in the basement of Hub Battle Land. He reveals to Silas that he has obtained the damaged Niska hard-drive, containing the incomplete version of the code, and has managed to retrieve some of the data, and he asks Silas for his help in reconstructing the Code. Mimi asks Tobbe to test her in case she is infected, and he finds she is clear of the virus, but when she returns to her room, Bea is waiting for her. Bea asks for the last part of the code, but Mimi lies and says she doesn't have it. Bea then makes Mimi repeat a series of phrases which apparently activate her "affirmative pursuit", overriding her initial resistance to Bea's declaration that Hubots are destined to rule the world.
| 12 | 2 | "Episode 2" | Harald Hamrell | Lars Lundström | 8 December 2013 |
Bea continues searching for the code that makes machines human. In her search for the scientist David Eischer’s clone, she seeks out David’s mother. Tobias struggles with his transhuman sexuality, as his heart still longs for Mimi. The Engman family receives a package containing their Granddad’s clone. Meanwhile, at Hub Battle Land, Silas works to get the business off the ground and Roger arrives for a job interview.
| 13 | 3 | "Episode 3" | Harald Hamrell | Alex Haridi | 15 December 2013 |
| 14 | 4 | "Episode 4" | Harald Hamrell | Alex Haridi | 22 December 2013 |
Douglas and Florentine plan their wedding, and Claes can't help interfering. Back at the Engmans’, Lennart’s clone is increasingly obstinate, in particular towards Hans, who is starting to lose patience. Mimi is hired at the law firm, but not everyone likes having a hubot as a colleague. The conflict between Real Humans and the Transhumans grows increasingly antagonistic. Sooner or later everyone will have to choose sides.
| 15 | 5 | "Episode 5" | Harald Hamrell | Alex Haridi | 30 December 2013 |
Bea and Cloette have finally located David’s clone, but the brain is missing. They continue their search while Tobias and Matilda investigate the code on the USB drive. A segment is missing and Matilda suspects that Mimi knows more than she lets on. When Roger is sent out to pick up a hubot, he's in for an unpleasant reunion. Florentine’s dream is about to come true - she's finally going to marry her Douglas. But perhaps human life is not all it's cracked up to be.
| 16 | 6 | "Episode 6" | Harald Hamrell | Lars Lundström | 5 January 2014 |
Therese wants to move to the more liberal Holland, but first she wants to try to convince Kevin to come along, so she visits him at the Real Humans Youth Camp. Tobias, Betty and Matilda decide to program David’s code into Lennart, with no idea of the consequences. Douglas and Florentine are placed on a three-year waiting list for adoption, but Florentine has no desire to wait - she wants a child now.
| 17 | 7 | "Episode 7" | Kristina Humle | Alex Haridi | 12 January 2014 |
| 18 | 8 | "Episode 8" | Christian Eklöw, Christopher Panov | Alex Haridi | 19 January 2014 |
| 19 | 9 | "Episode 9" | Christian Eklöw, Christopher Panov | Lars Lundström | 26 January 2014 |
Mimi's condition is getting worse; the Engmans discover something about her past. In an attempt to destroy Florentine, Petra turns to the police and the Real Humans; Claes and Inger fight hard to save her. Jonas continues his plan to transfer his consciousness into his clone, but to succeed, Silas must do him a great service. Jonas begins to doubt David's clone after a disclosure from Bea.
| 20 | 10 | "Episode 10" | Christian Eklöw, Christopher Panov | Lars Lundström | 2 February 2014 |
Florentine’s future is being settled in court and Mimi, wracked with the virus, is called as a witness. Then, an unexpected person from her past appears in the courtroom. Kevin and a group of Real Humans Youths decide to go to Hub Battle Land to destroy hubots. Meanwhile, Rick, who is armed, aims to do all that he can to defend Hub Battle Land from humans and Bea gets Roger involved in the search for the code.

== Reception ==
The first season of the program received glowing reviews. Io9's Charlie Jane Anders called the program "startlingly beautiful", disturbing and "creepy as hell". The Australian called it "the best science fiction to hit the small screen in a long time".

== Remakes ==
=== English-language adaptation ===
The rights to an English-language version of the programme were sold to Kudos Film & Television, and the format rights and international distribution to Shine Limited. Called Humans, the English-language version debuted in 2015 on Channel 4 in the UK, on AMC in the US and Canada, and on ABC in Australia. The second season started airing in October 2016. The third season started airing in May 2018 (UK) and June 2018 (US). In May 2019, Channel 4 announced that the series had been cancelled.

=== Chinese adaptation ===
On 25 July 2018, it was announced Roland Moore would be head writer on a Chinese version of Humans, produced by Endemol Shine China and Croton Media. The series began airing on Chinese broadcaster Tencent on 19 February 2021.
