= Adam Randall =

Adam Randall may refer to:

- Adam Randall (American football) (born 2004), American football player
- Adam Randall (director) (born 1982), British film and television director

== See also ==
- Adam Randell (born 2000), English footballer
