= Leila Mimmack =

English actress

- Born: 5 November 1993 (age 32); Leamington Spa, Warwickshire, England
- Education: Stratford-upon-Avon College
- Occupation: Actress
- Years active: 2010–present

Leila Mimmack (born 5 November 1993) is an English actress.

== Early life ==
Mimmack was born on 5 November 1993 in Leamington Spa to parents Maddy Kerr and Peter Mimmack, who run the Heartbreak Productions theatre company in Spencer Yard, Leamington. Mimmack went to Stratford-upon-Avon College. During her eight year at school Mimmack's teacher described the destruction of the rainforest, which had a big effect on her. Mimmack later became a climate change campaigner and attended rallies and marches. When she was 19 she moved to a narrowboat moored in Hackney marshes, partly because of environmental reasons.

== Career ==
Her first success as an actress came in 2008 when she won the "Best Teenage Actress" Award at the "Growing Talent Convention" in Paris, beating 300 competitors. Her first television appearance was in 2010 when she appeared in the BBC series Doctors as Vanessa Finch. In 2011, she played the werewolf Christa in the Being Human spin off Becoming Human. Furthermore, she could be seen in the mini series Mayday, as the May queen Hattie, who disappeared when she was cycling towards the May Day parade. She also appeared as a 17-year old Polish girl Dita in the television series Inside Men. In 2014 starred as the 19 year-old Brighton call-girl Blue in The Sleeping Room. In the same year she appeared as young Mary in Son of God. In the British thriller Level Up she plays Anna who has been kidnapped by masked thugs. In 2015, she got the role of Laura Campbell in Home Fires, who has an affair with a married military officer. Also in 2015, she played Rowenna Napier in Midwinter of the Spirit. In 2020, she returned to Doctors in the recurring role of Tanya Rees.

== Filmography ==
Film
Year	Title	Role	Notes
2011	Seamonsters	Lori	
2013	Game	Susan	
2014	Cold Comfort	Michelle	
2014	Son of God	Young Mary	
2014	Two Housemates		
2014	The Sleeping Room	Blue	
2015	High-Rise	Laura	
2015	Level Up	Anna	

Television
Year	Title	Role	Notes
2010	Doctors	Vanessa Finch	episode 11x208
2010	Married Single Other	Gina	episode 1x01 – 1x06
2010	EastEnders	Katy	episode 3770
2010	The Bill	Zoe Richards	episode 26x28
2011	Becoming Human	Christa	Web series, episode 1x01-1x08
2011	The Reckoning	Jasmine	episode 1x02
2011	Holby City	Cady Green	episode 13x39
2012	Inside Men	Dita	episode 1x01-1x04
2012	Lewis	Yasmin Randall	episode 6x03
2013	Mayday	Caitlin / Hattie	episode 1x01-1x05
2013	Frankie	Paula Simms	episode 1x01-1x06
2013	Law & Order UK	Ruth Pendle	episode 7x06
2013	The Bible	Young Mary	episode 1x06
2014	WPC 56	Tracey Nichols	episode 2x01
2015	Silent Witness	Lana Sutherland	Episode: "Falling Angels" (2 parts)
2015	Midwinter of the Spirit	Rowenna Napier	episode 1x01-1x03
2015	Home Fires	Laura Campbell	episode 1x01-2x06
2017	Love, Lies and Records	Marcia	episode 1x01, 1x03-1x06
2020	Doctors	Tanya Rees	Recurring role

== Theatre ==
Year	Title	Role	Theatre	Location
	Sweeney Todd	Daughter	Loft Theatre	Leamington Spa, United Kingdom
2002	Toad of Toad Hall	Ensemble	Loft Theatre	Leamington Spa, United Kingdom
2002	Richard III	Prince	Heartbreak Productions	
2003	A Midsummer Night's Dream	Peaseblossom	Heartbreak Productions	
2009	As You Like it	Page	Heartbreak Productions	
2010	That Face	Mia	The Studio	Sheffield, United Kingdom
2011	A View From The Bridge	Catherine (Lead)	Royal Exchange	Manchester, United Kingdom
2014	Debris	Michelle (Lead)	Southwark Playhouse	London, United Kingdom
2016	The Winter's Tale	Perdita	Octagon Theatre	Bolton
2016	To Kill a Mockingbird	Mayella Ewell	Octagon Theatre	Bolton
2019	Richard III	Anne/Norfolk	Alexandra Palace (and UK Tour)	London, United Kingdom
2019	God's Dice	Edie	Soho Theatre	London, United Kingdom
