= Simon Ludders =

English actor, writer and director

- Occupations: Actor, writer, director
- Years active: 1994–present

Simon Ludders is an English film and television actor, writer and director. He is best known for starring as Renfield in Young Dracula, a CBBC television series that initially aired in 2006 and finalised in 2014.

He also played Trevor Smith in Broadchurch and appeared as Mr Swan in TV mini-series Becoming Human.

Next to appearing in film and television, Ludders is a theatre actor. In October 2014, he played Banquo in Macbeth, by William Shakespeare, at the Colchester Mercury.

Ludders had most recently appeared in the fifth series of The Dumping Ground, the spin-off of the successful Tracy Beaker franchise as Peter Umbleby, a snobby next door neighbour living next to the care home, with a strong grudge against living next to a children's home, and later in the series finale, trying to get the care home closed and knocked down.

== Acting credits ==
=== Film ===
Year	Title	Role	Notes
1996	Darklands	2nd cop	
2003	Calendar Girls	Waiter	
2017	Catherine the Great: Husbands, Lovers and Sons	Pugachev	
2017	Alexander I: Into the Woods	Sperensky	
2018	Red Joan	Naval Captain	
2019	The Shores	Oxir	
2019	Silver Darlings	Reggie	

=== Television ===
Year	Title	Role	Notes
1994	Shakespeare: The Animated Tales	Roderigo	Episode: "Othello"
1996	Wales Playhouse	Rhys	Episode: "Every Cloud"
1996	Testament: The Bible in Animation	Simeon/Butler	Episode: "Joseph"
1997	Harpur and Iles	Bank Manager	TV movie
1999	Lucky Bag		TV series
1999–2016	Casualty	Corp Burridge/Paul Bamford/Chris Dunham	4 episodes
2000	The Magic Paintbrush: A Story from China	Henchman (voice)	Short film (TV)
2000	Care	Clerk of the Court	TV movie
2002	The Basil Brush Show	Vermokiller	Episode: Mouse
2002	The Story of Tracy Beaker	Brian Gee	Episode: Child of the Week
2002	High Hopes	Vicar	Episode: Heavens Above!
2002	I'm Alan Partridge	Builder	3 episodes
2003–04	My Family	Undertaker 2/Teacher	2 episodes
2004	The Bill	Danny Partridge	Episode: 207
2004	Tunnel of Love	Education Officer 2	
2006	Doctor Who	Patient	Episode: "New Earth"
2006	Green Wing	Detective	1 episode
2006–2014	Young Dracula	Renfield	66 episodes
2008	Belonging	Mr. Smith	1 episode
2008	Wire in the Blood		Episode: The Dead Land: Part 2
2009	Scoop	Sid The Source	13 episodes
2009	The Green Green Grass	Ian	Episode: The Departed
2009–2011	Gigglebiz	Various	16 episodes
2010	Rock & Chips	Mr. Manley	Pilot
2010	New Tricks	Richard – MI5	Episode: Left Field
2011	Becoming Human	Mr Swan	5 episodes
2013	Broadchurch	Trevor Smith	6 episodes
2014	Playhouse Presents	Mr. Wicks	Episode: Damned
2014	Doctors	Luke Jarvis	Episode: More Like Clouds Than Stars
2015	Spotless	Peter Marshall-Edwards	2 episodes
2015	Boy Meets Girl	Waiter	Episode: Episode #1.1
2016	Stella	Rev. Watts	Episode: Episode #5.9
2016	The Five	Joe Hanley	Episode: Episode #1.3
2017	The Dumping Ground	Peter Umbleby	6 episodes
2017	Back	Trevor Ellis	Episode: Episode #1.2
2017	Doctor Who	Overseer	Episode: "Thin Ice"
2018	EastEnders	DC Anderson	1 episode
2019	Dad's Army: The Lost Episodes	Warden Hodges	Episode: "Under Fire"
2019	The Captures	Forensics Officer Nick May	2 episodes
2020- present	Miss Scarlet and The Duke	Mr. Barnabus Potts	Series regular
2020	Bridgerton	Humboldt	4 episodes
2021	The Irregulars	Landlord	Episode: "Chapter Four: Both the Needle and the Knife"
2023	You	Robert	Episode: "Hampsie"
2026	Falling	Father Bennet	1 episode
TBA	Winter Place	Lord Fairfax	In production

=== Video games ===
Year	Title	Role	Notes
2020	Assassin's Creed: Valhalla	Additional voices	
2022	A Plague Tale: Requiem	Bandits / Various	English version

=== Audio dramas ===
Year	Title	Role	Notes
2016	Torchwood: Outbreak	Luke Palmer	
2017	Tommies	Bettsworth / Teddy Graham	2 episodes
2018	Torchwood: Monthly Range	Policeman	Episode: "Instant Karma"
2018	The War Master	Elliot King	2 episodes
2021	The Archers	Counsellor	Episode: "#1.19493"

=== Theatre ===
Year	Title	Role	Theatre	Location
2014	Macbeth	Banquo	Mercury Theatre	Colchester
2015	The Forsythe Sisters		Norwegian Church Arts Centre	

== Filmmaking credits ==
=== Film ===
Year	Title	Functioned as	Notes
2005	The Last Child of the Sixties	writer, director and producer	Short film

=== Television ===
Year	Title	Functioned as	Notes
1999	Lucky Bag	writer	TV series
2001	TV to Go	writer	TV series
2007–2016	The Armstrong and Miller Show	writer	TV series, 11 episodes
2011	Tati's Hotel	writer	TV series, 2 episodes
2012–2016	Stella	writer	TV series, 9 episodes
2017	Gigglebiz	writer	TV series, 2 episodes
