= Alex Kalymnios =

English director, producer and screenwriter

- Born: Alexandra Maria Kalymnios
- Other name: Alexandra Kalymnios
- Education: Bournemouth University (BA)
- Years active: 2002–present
- Website: alexkalymnios.com

Alexandra Maria Kalymnios is an English director, producer and screenwriter.

== Early life ==
Kalymnios was born to a Greek father and a Greek Cypriot mother, who worked as a physics professor and teacher respectively, and grew up in North London. Kalymnios attended the Latymer School in Edmonton. She initially wanted to become an actress before deciding to go into directing after directing her first school play. She went on to graduate from Bournemouth University with a Bachelor of Arts (BA) in TV and Video Production in 2002. After graduating, she won a placement at the BBC Director's Academy. She later described it as a great learning experience.

== Career ==
Kalymnios was employed as a runner at Children's BBC. During her four years at Children's BBC she worked up to Assistant Producer. While she was working there she also directed, produced and wrote the short film More Than a Job's Worth. In 2007 Kalymnios started to direct episodes of the TV series Hollyoaks. Until 2009 she directed 13 episodes. From 2008–2012 Kalymnios directed seven episodes of the Hollyoaks spin-off Hollyoaks Later. In 2011 Kalyminos directed the Being Human spin-off Becoming Human. This series brought her a BAFTA Cymru nomination for Digital Creativity and Games and a Banff Rockie Award nomination for Best Webseries – Fiction. Other series that Kalymnios directed were: Seacht, The Cut, EastEnders and Waterloo Road. In 2015 she directed the movie Cleveland Abduction.

== Personal life ==
Kalymnios is married and has a daughter.

== Filmography ==
Short film

| Year | Title | Director | Producer | Writer |
|---|---|---|---|---|
| 2005 | More Than a Job's Worth | Yes | Yes | Yes |
| 2007 | The Green Fairy | Yes | No | No |

Television

| Year | Title | Notes |
|---|---|---|
| 2007–2009 | Hollyoaks | 13 episodes |
| 2008–2012 | Hollyoaks Later | 7 episodes |
| 2009 | Seacht | 4 episodes |
| 2010 | The Cut | 3 episodes |
| 2010–2013: | EastEnders | 16 episodes |
| 2011 | Becoming Human | 8 episodes |
| 2011–2014: | Waterloo Road | 4 episodes |
| 2015 | Cleveland Abduction | TV movie |
| 2015 | Salem | 1 episode |
| 2016 | Scott & Bailey | 3 episodes |
| 2017–18 | The 100 | 2 episodes |
| 2017 | The White Princess | 3 episodes |
| 2017 | Once Upon a Time | 1 episode |
| 2018 | Quantico | 1 episode |
| 2018 | Timeless | 1 episode |
| 2018–19 | Impulse | 2 episodes |
| 2018–19 | Titans | 2 episodes |
| 2019 | S.W.A.T. | 1 episode |
| 2021 | Three Families | Miniseries |
| 2022 | The Recruit | |

== Awards and nominations ==
Greenwich International Film Festival

- 2005: Best New Director (won)

Raindance East Festival

- 2005: Best Short Film (Nominated)

BAFTA Cymru Awards:

- 2012: Digital Creativity & Games (Becoming Human, shared with Philip Trethowan and Hannah Thomas) (Nominated)

Banff Rockie Award:

- 2012: Best Webseries – Fiction (Becoming Human, shared with Hannah Thomas) (Nominated)
