= Manpreet Bachu =

English actor (born 1994)

- Born: Manpreet Singh Bachu; April 1994 (age 31); Coventry, West Midlands, England
- Occupation: Actor
- Years active: 2012–present
- Television: River City; Casualty

Manpreet Singh Bachu (born April 1994) is an English actor. After roles in Humans and The Royals, he appeared in the BBC Scotland soap opera River City as Harry Jandhu. Bachu continued to make various television appearances in series including Fleabag, Doctors, Killing Eve and DI Ray until he was cast in the BBC medical drama series Casualty as Tariq Hussein in 2024.

== Life and career ==
Manpreet Singh Bachu was born in April 1994 in Coventry, West Midlands. In 2012, he made his television debut in an episode of the ITV sketch show Fool Britannia. A year later, he appeared in an episode of the BBC series Doctor Who. Then, in 2015, Bachu starred in the Channel 4 series Humans, as well as playing a recurring role in The Royals. That same year, he was cast in the regular role of Harry Jandhu on the BBC Scotland soap opera River City. He appeared until a year later. After leaving River City, Bachu made his film debut in the 2016 film Level Up. Following this, he made two further film appearances: The Moment (2017) and Earthy Encounters (2018).

Bachu returned to television in 2019 with guest appearances in The Stand Up Sketch Show and Fleabag. In 2020, Bachu portrayed Hemil Chaudry in an episode of the BBC daytime soap opera Doctors. Bachu then starred in the 2021 short film Slave to the Page. For his portrayal of Dev Sharma in the short, he received award nominations at the Midlands Movies Awards and the Unrestricted View Film Festival. 2022 saw Bachu have recurring roles in the BBC thriller series Killing Eve and the ITV procedural drama DI Ray, as well as appearing in the Dutch film Soof 3. In 2024, Bachu made numerous television appearances, including guest roles in the BBC Three fantasy series Domino Day and the Apple TV+ miniseries Masters of the Air. Also in 2024, he made his first appearance in the BBC medical drama series Casualty. He made his first appearance as Tariq Hussein in February 2024. His final episode aired in March 2025.

== Filmography ==
Year	Title	Role	Notes
2012	Fool Britannia	Trainee	1 episode
2013	Doctor Who	Nabile	Episode: "The Bells of Saint John"
2015	Humans	Harun Khan	Main role
2015	The Royals	Ashok	Recurring role
2015–2016	River City	Harry Jandhu	Regular role
2016	Level Up	Jamz	Film
2017	The Moment	Raj	Film
2018	Earthy Encounters	Agent Kew	Film
2019	The Stand Up Sketch Show	Franz	1 episode
2019	Fleabag	The Waiter	1 episode
2020	Doctors	Hemil Chaudry	Episode: "Mother Nature"
2021	Slave to the Page	Dev Sharma	Short film
2022	Killing Eve	Elliot	Recurring role
2022	DI Ray	Kabir Kapoor	Recurring role
2022	Soof 3	Sundeep	Film
2024	Domino Day	Krish	Recurring role
2024	Masters of the Air	British Officer #2	Episode: "Part Six"
2024–2025	Casualty	Tariq Hussein	Main role
2025	Midsomer Murders	Dan Peacey	Episode: "Treasures of Darkness"
2025	The War Between the Land and the Sea	Ravi Singh	Miniseries, 2 episodes

== Awards and nominations ==
Year	Ceremony	Category	Nominated work	Result	Ref.
2022	Midlands Movies Awards	Best Actor in a Leading Role	Slave to the Page	Nominated	
2022	Unrestricted View Film Festival	Best Actor (Short Film)	Slave to the Page	Nominated	
