= Level Up (2016 film) =

- Directed by: Adam Randall
- Written by: Adam Randall; Gary Young
- Produced by: Heather Greenwood; Andrew Orr; Danny Potts
- Starring: Josh Bowman; Neil Maskell; William Houston; Kulvinder Ghir; Doc Brown; Leila Mimmack
- Cinematography: Eben Bolter
- Edited by: Kate Coggins
- Music by: Plaid
- Production companies: Fulwell 73; Independent Entertainment; Quickfire Films
- Distributed by: FilmBuff
- Release date: 26 August 2016
- Running time: 100 minutes
- Country: United Kingdom
- Language: English

Level Up is a 2016 British thriller film directed by Adam Randall, starring Josh Bowman, Neil Maskell, William Houston, Kulvinder Ghir, Doc Brown and Leila Mimmack.

== Cast ==
- Josh Bowman as Matt
- Neil Maskell as Dmitri
- William Houston as The Businessman
- Kulvinder Ghir as Osman
- Doc Brown as Joel
- Leila Mimmack as Anna
- Christina Wolfe as Kya
- Paul Reynolds as Taxi Driver
- Cameron Jack as Calvin
- Jonathan Arkwright as Sean
- Leon Annor as Keon
- Pamela Binns as Old Lady
- Okorie Chukwu as Hoodie
- Jack Fox as Steve
- Manpreet Bachu as Jamz
- Rina Takasaki as Karaoke Receptionist
- Samuel Fava as Beggar

== Release ==
The film was released in the United States on 26 August 2016.

== Reception ==
Frank Scheck of The Hollywood Reporter wrote that the film "achieves most of its tension thanks to the pulsing musical score by the British electronic duo Plaid", and while the screenplay "admirably stresses action over dialogue", it "falls somewhat short in the clarity department." He also praised Bowman's performance, writing that he "well fulfills the considerable physical demands of his everyman role, engaging our sympathy with his less than macho responses to the dangers with which he’s faced."

Pete Vonder Haar of The Village Voice wrote that Randall "keeps the action tightly paced and the dialogue to a refreshing minimum, helping to heighten Matt’s growing isolation."

Dennis Harvey of Variety wrote that while the film is "admirable as a demonstration of resourcefulness within modest budget confines", and is "watchable enough", it "fails to come up with anything original or memorable in the realms of plotting, atmosphere, or character invention.".

Jeannette Catsoulis of The New York Times wrote that while Randall "shows some aptitude for the tease and for maintaining a stranglehold on the movie’s sourly cynical tone", while Bolten "gives key indoor scenes a bilious menace", the film "requires a lead with considerably more charisma and skills than Mr. Bowman."
