= Josh Brown (actor) =

British actor (born 1990)

- Born: 19 February 1990 (age 35); Leeds, West Yorkshire, UK
- Occupation: actor

Joshua Brown (born 19 February 1990) is a British actor from Leeds. He is best known for playing Alex Pickering in the long-running BBC school drama Grange Hill and for the main role of Matt in the Being Human spin-off, Becoming Human. He has also appeared in another long-running series, Casualty. He guest starred in an episode of Holby City as a character called Frankie Moores. He also appeared in series 5 of Waterloo Road.

Brown was born in Leeds and grew up in Batley. He attended the Stage 84 Performing Arts School in Bradford.

In 2013, Brown started his acting school, the Joshua Brown School of Acting.

== Filmography (selection) ==
Television
Year	Title	Role	Notes
2005	Casualty	Darren Sullivan	TV series, 1 episode
2005–2008	Grange Hill	Alex Pickering	TV series, 66 episodes, lead
2007–2009	Holby City	Frankie Moors	TV series, 5 episodes
2010	Waterloo Road	Aiden Keen	TV series, 1 episode
2011	Becoming Human	Matt	TV series, 8 episodes, lead
2011	Shameless	Mushroom	TV series, 1 episode
2012	Emmerdale	Oli Appleton	TV series, 4 episodes

Film
Year	Title	Role	Notes
2012	The Happy Lands	Pat Brogan	
2014	The Knife That Killed Me	Billy	
2017	They Finally Made a Handmaid's Tale for Men		
