= Brian Dooley (writer) =

English television writer

- Born: Brian Dooley; 16 April 1971 (age 55); Crosby, England
- Occupations: Screenwriter, author, actor

Brian Dooley (born 16 April 1971) is an English television writer.

He is best known for creating the sitcom The Smoking Room, which debuted on BBC Three in 2004, before it was transferred to BBC Two, and for which he received a BAFTA in 2005. He also appears in the series as Ben from the post room.

== Education ==
Dooley was educated at Fitzwilliam College, Cambridge.

== Career ==
In 2007, Dooley contributed to the Doctor Who short story collection Short Trips: Snapshots. It was announced in Doctor Who Magazine issue 406 that he would write two episodes of series 3 of the Doctor Who spin-off The Sarah Jane Adventures, but his script, which formed the basis of Mona Lisa's Revenge, was rewritten to the extent that only Phil Ford was credited.

Other credits include Monkey Dust, The Sketch Show, Being Human and its iPlayer spin-off Becoming Human and plays for Radio Four.
