= Mayday (British TV series) =

British drama television series

- Genre: Drama thriller
- Created by: Ben Court; Caroline Ip
- Written by: Ben Court; Caroline Ip
- Directed by: Brian Welsh
- Starring: Peter Firth; Peter McDonald; Leila Mimmack; Aidan Gillen; Sophie Okonedo; Lesley Manville; Max Fowler; Tom Fisher; Sam Spruell
- Composer: Stuart Earl
- Country of origin: United Kingdom
- Original language: English
- No. of series: 1
- No. of episodes: 5

Production
- Executive producers: Jane Featherstone; Polly Hill
- Producer: Chris Fry
- Production locations: Dorking, Surrey, England
- Cinematography: Dirk Nel; Zac Nicholson
- Running time: 57-59 minutes
- Production company: Kudos

Original release
- Network: BBC One
- Release: 3 March – 7 March 2013

Mayday is a British drama thriller television series shown on BBC One, starring Leila Mimmack, Sophie Okonedo, Aidan Gillen, Peter Firth, and Lesley Manville.

== Development and production ==
The series' commission was announced on 27 April 2012 by the BBC Media Centre. The series was filmed in Dorking, Surrey, making use of street settings including the high street area, Cotmandene (an open grassed area close to the town centre), a kebab shop on the corner of Dene Street and Leith Hill. The old magistrates court was used as the police station and the production was based in Pippbrook House which had housed the town library.

== Premise ==
A thriller series about the sudden disappearance of a 14-year-old girl in a small town with a relatively affluent rural setting and strong pagan traditions. The locals are galvanized to work with the police to find her. Ex-copper Fiona, frustrated with her present life, soon becomes involved. Her policeman husband's career is hanging in the balance following an accusation of assault on duty. The stress he is under adjusts his disposition and lends itself to doubts - in his wife's mind - concerning his propriety and morality.

It is an investigative drama with a difference - the action is centred on the community figures and not the detectives.

== Cast and characters ==
- Leila Mimmack as Hattie, the missing young May Queen, and as, Caitlin, Hattie's more rebellious twin sister who has always felt that she lived in her sister's shadow.
- Peter Firth as Malcolm, a very successful local public figure, proud of his achievements and self-made millions.
- Sophie Okonedo as Fiona, an ex police officer who has left the force to look after her three children.
- Aidan Gillen as Everett, a funny, irreverent and spontaneous person until his life was destroyed by the tragic death of his wife in suspicious circumstances.
- Lesley Manville as Gail, Malcolm's wife who is trapped in an almost loveless marriage.
- Peter McDonald as Alan, a tough, no nonsense and strait-laced policeman.
- Tom Fisher as Seth, a man with a personality disorder who spends most of his time in the woods.
- Sam Spruell as Steve, who is driven by a strong sense of responsibility and a need to prove himself.
- Max Fowler as Linus, an intelligent, funny and assured teenager who also has a darker side.

== Episodes ==
No.	Title	Directed by	Written by	Original release date	UK viewers (millions)
1	"Episode 1"	Brian Welsh	Ben Court; Caroline Ip	3 March 2013	7.68
It's May Day and the members of a small community go about their business as they wait for this year's parade to begin. But when the May Queen - local teenager Hattie Sutton - fails to appear, several townsfolk are sent spinning by the suspicion that someone among them has taken her.
2	"Episode 2"	Brian Welsh	Ben Court; Caroline Ip	4 March 2013	5.84
The day after Hattie's disappearance the locals unite to look for her, with Steve leading the search in the hope of winning favour with the girl's family, and also to conceal his worries about his brother. Routine questioning by the police gives Linus food for thought about his father, while Gail grows increasingly suspicious of husband Malcolm, so her son James goes rooting through his office for clues. Ex-cop Fiona ignores husband Alan's protests and embarks on her own unofficial investigation.
3	"Episode 3"	Brian Welsh	Ben Court; Caroline Ip	5 March 2013	5.85
A devastating discovery throws the spotlight on a key suspect and forces Gail to face unwelcome facts about husband Malcolm. Caitlin and Linus's relationship deepens when she tells him a shameful secret about the day her sister went missing, while Fiona grows suspicious of Everett.
4	"Episode 4"	Brian Welsh	Ben Court; Caroline Ip	6 March 2013	6.00
Linus makes a dangerous promise to Caitlin and discovers the true nature of Everett's connection to Hattie. Fiona and Alan come to blows over Charlotte's odd behaviour, while Gail's lack of forgiveness drives a wedge between her and James.
5	"Episode 5"	Brian Welsh	Ben Court; Caroline Ip	7 March 2013	6.16
As the townsfolk gather for the memorial, things take a dark turn and a chaotic interruption has fatal consequences. Steve finally gets his moment with Angie - will he manage to win his family back? Fiona must face her old colleagues in a way she never thought she would, Caitlin makes an eerie transformation, and Everett and Linus have a confrontation that takes their relationship to a new level.

== DVD release ==
The complete series of Mayday was released by Acorn Media UK on 8 April 2013.
