= The Happy Lands =

- Directed by: Robert Rae
- Written by: Peter Cox; Robert Rae
- Produced by: Greg McManus; Helen Trew
- Starring: Kevin Clarke; Jokie Wallace; Aaron Jones; Kevin Adair
- Cinematography: Scott Ward
- Edited by: Florian Nonnenmacher
- Music by: James Ross
- Production company: Theatre Workshop Scotland
- Release date: 17 February 2012
- Running time: 108 minutes
- Country: United Kingdom
- Languages: English; Scots

The Happy Lands is a 2012 British film written by Peter Cox and Robert Rae about a coal-mining community in Fife, Scotland, during the general strike of 1926. The film was released on 17 February 2012. Much of the film's dialogue is in the Scots language. Many of the cast members were amateurs who had no previous acting experience, and are relatives to the real-life miners involved in the historical strike.

== Plot ==
The film begins with a miner suffering a back injury at a colliery in the fictional village of Carhill. When confronted about working conditions, the mine owner responds by saying that the workers are locked out until they accept a settlement that involves longer working hours and lower wages. The rest of the film shows the various stages of the eight-month strike by coal miners across Britain, including the general strike launched by the Trades Union Congress in support of the miners. The film makes several references to the First World War, in which many of the striking miners fought and were rewarded for their bravery.

== Cast ==
- Kevin Clarke as Michael Brogan
- Jokie Wallace as Dan Guthrie
- Aaron Jones as Wee Baxie
- David Reilly as Joe Guthrie
- Kevin Adair as Davey King
- Farah Ahmed as Mary Miller
- Stevie Allan as Pug Henderson
- Jez Arrow as Economic League
- Michael Barney as Special Constable
- Madeline Berry as Granny King
- Josh Brown as Pat Brogan
- Cllr Willie Clarke as Regional Union Official
- Craig Clarke as Andy Jenkins
- Kristen Clarke as Billy Jenkins
- Patricia Colville as Jenny Saville
- Fiona Combe as Lily Wilson
- Allan Stewart as Harry Lauder
- Margaret Feeley as Granny Guthrie
- Megan Taylor as Susie Smith
- Michael Todd as Miner
