= John Jackson (writer) =

English screenwriter

- Occupation: Screenwriter
- Years active: 2001–present
- Known for: Grantchester, Being Human

John Jackson is an English television screenwriter.

== Life and career ==
After leaving Cambridge University, John Jackson developed and script edited the ITV soap Night and Day. Altogether he wrote 35 episodes for the TV Series. In 2009 he wrote the episode The King Is Dead, Long Live the King… for the BBC One series Robin Hood. From 2010 to 2012 he wrote two episodes of the serial drama Lip Service. From 2011 until 2013 he wrote three episodes for the supernatural drama Being Human. This brought him a Writers' Guild of Great Britain award for Best TV Drama Series. He also wrote two episodes for the Being Human spin off Becoming Human.

In 2014 Jackson wrote an episode for another BBC Three series, In the Flesh. He would become a regular writer on ITV's Grantchester, and in 2020, was lead writer on season 3 of Sky's Riviera. On 2 November 2023, it was announced that Jackson would be lead writer on the television adaptation of Rivers of London.

== Filmography ==
Year	Title	Notes	Broadcaster
2001	Night and Day	35 episodes	ITV
2004	Powers	1 episode	BBC One
2009	Robin Hood	1 episode	BBC One
2010–2012:	Lip Service	2 episodes	BBC Three
2011	Becoming Human	2 episodes	BBC iPlayer
2011–2013	Being Human	3 episodes	BBC Three
2014	In the Flesh	1 episode	BBC Three
2016	The Five	1 episode	Sky1
2016–2022	Grantchester	7 episodes	ITV
2017	The Tunnel	1 episode	Sky Atlantic
2018	Trust	2 episodes	FX
2019	Curfew	1 episode	Sky1
2020	Riviera	Lead writer	Sky Atlantic
2023	A Town Called Malice	1 episode	Sky Max
2023	No Escape	1 episode	Paramount+
2024	The Gentlemen	1 episode	Netflix
TBA	Rivers of London	Lead writer	TBA

== Awards and nominations ==
=== Awards ===
Writers' Guild of Great Britain Award:

- 2012: Best TV Drama Series (Being Human)
