= The Smoking Room =

British TV sitcom (BBC Three, 2004–05)

- Genre: Sitcom
- Created by: Brian Dooley
- Starring: Robert Webb
- Opening theme: "Close to Me" by The Cure
- Country of origin: United Kingdom
- Original language: English
- No. of series: 2
- No. of episodes: 17 (inc. Christmas special)

Production
- Editors: Mark Lawrence; Richard Halladey; Paul Machliss; Nigel Williams
- Running time: 29 mins approx.

Original release
- Network: BBC Three
- Release: 29 June 2004 – 13 September 2005

The Smoking Room is a British television sitcom written by Brian Dooley, who won a BAFTA for the series in 2005. The first series, consisting of eight episodes, was originally transmitted on BBC Three between 29 June and 17 August 2004. The Christmas Special was first transmitted on 21 December 2004. A second series of eight episodes began airing on 26 July 2005.

The first series, including the Christmas Special, was released on DVD by the BBC on 6 February 2006 and on CD in a four-disc set on 4 April 2005 (without the Christmas Special). The second series was released on 16 October 2006; a boxed set containing both series was released on the same date.

A third series was not commissioned; in an interview for the BBC News website on 30 November 2006, Robert Webb (who played Robin) said in passing, "...there is no more Smoking Room". England's smoking ban, which prohibits indoor smoking in public places, came into force on 1 July 2007, as a result of which internal smoking rooms, like the one in which the series is set, became illegal.

== Plot and analysis ==
At the time the series was made, smoking was prohibited in the offices of most British companies, but there was often a room in the building that smokers could use during work hours.

The series is entirely set in the smoking room (Room B209, although, in the second series, the sign on one door says B211) in the basement of the offices of a fictitious company. Most of the people seen in the smoking room are workers in the building.

Room B209 is L-shaped and contains office-style tables and chairs, and a hot drinks machine which often malfunctions. It has two doors that lead to the same corridor and is drably decorated in a dull yellow with signs of water damage on one wall. Company-related notices adorn the walls, and old furniture and office equipment is stacked in the corner. Only occasional glimpses of the outside world are seen through the room's misted glass.

Although each episode contains a distinct storyline, the series is fundamentally character and dialogue-driven. Each episode's story is generally self-contained, though there are some ongoing story threads, such as the gradual revelation of Robin's sexuality to the other characters and his unrequited infatuation with Ben from the post room.

== Theme music ==
The theme music for the programme is two different versions of "Close to Me" by The Cure, used without the vocals. This theme was not used in episodes screened in New Zealand and Australia on UK.TV

== Main characters ==
There are 10 main characters though not all appear in each episode. Most of the characters are somewhat disaffected with their lives and jobs. The smoking room is an oasis where they can relax, indulge and shut out the rest of the world. Due to a rule devised by Clint, discussion of work-related matters ("shop talk") is forbidden in the smoking room, though there are some brief work-related discussions. Some characters spend long stretches in the room, with some present for most or all of a 30-minute episode. The occasional non-smoker also drops by the room.

There is a general camaraderie between several of the smokers.

=== Annie (Debbie Chazen) ===
Annie is 29 and works in the graphics department. She considers herself rather 'New Age' and sometimes talks about past-life experiences. She will accept theories from anywhere, including a souvenir mug with a picture of Vishnu on it, and a self-help CD she listened to, but didn't buy, in the middle of HMV. She can be very over-emotional and attention-seeking and is always telling dramatic stories about herself which seem unlikely, although when Sally challenges her about her claim to have been trapped in a photo booth for three hours, Annie is easily able to provide photographic evidence.

She is constantly looking for a boyfriend and is prepared to go to extreme lengths to retain one (including dressing as the male police officer who directed the Fred West case). She seems to have the busiest sex life of anyone in the room but hasn't managed to find love. Her choice of men is misguided. One married man she dated sent private photographs he took of her to a pornographic magazine; it is implied that Barry saw these pictures. She had a liaison with Clint at Lucy Wu's party, which we learn about in Episode Three, and in Episode Five she buys him some chocolates for Valentine's Day, but this appears to be a passing fancy. She flirts outrageously with Janet's nephew, Dominic, in Episode Ten.

Annie is always sponging cigarettes, change for the drinks machine and food from the other characters, occasionally using emotional blackmail to increase her chances of success. She is prepared to eat almost anything, including a half-eaten salad dusted with cigarette ash and a mauled unwrapped Toffo. Despite the fact that she smokes somebody's cigarettes in every episode, usually Sally's, she doesn't regard herself as a smoker.

She considers herself to be an artist and, although she says that she became a graphic designer because she likes designing posters, she finds her job unfulfilling. In Episode Ten she arrives with a collection of homemade ashtrays which she tries to sell to her colleagues, despite the fact that the paint is highly flammable.

=== Barry (Jeremy Swift) ===
Barry is divorced and approaching 40. He is neurotic and obsessive (to the point of hoarding used matches), suffering from many phobias some verging on the ridiculous, although he is oddly unfazed by a real crisis. He seems bumbling and insecure, though his portrait from 1987 shows him as somewhat fashionable and confident. We learn that he joined the company as a graduate of Oxford Polytechnic and that Sharon was his secretary. They had a tentative romance which foundered when Barry got the venue of a date wrong; it takes them 20 years to discuss the misunderstanding. Sharon and Barry remain barbed and confrontational with each other.

Barry blames circumstance and others for his lack of career progression, but there is evidence he is not very attentive to his job. He dislikes children – including his own nieces – and family life in general, and makes little attempt to hide this. He has nothing good to say about his first wife, Pamela, and whenever we hear of his attempts to seduce other women they are always failures.

Barry is usually seen attempting to solve the day's crossword, and although he considers himself something of a crossword expert his answers are often ludicrous and Robin solves many of the (sometimes very easy) clues for him.

=== Clint (Fraser Ayres) ===
Clint is the 23-year-old maintenance man. Although he genuinely loves his job, which he considers to be the most important one in the company, he spends most of his time thinking about other things, like whether or not dogs who have jobs get jealous of pets.

He has a very relaxed approach to life, even to the point of suspending his attempt to repair a lift full of people in order to smoke a roll-up. He doesn't seem to be much good at his job when he does get around to it. He has a tendency to lose ladders, one of which trips up and nearly kills someone. We also learn that his neglect of a loose floor tile in the smoking room has put one of his colleagues into a coma. He is constantly thwarted in his attempts to fix the drinks machine and has consequently become highly emotional in his dealings with it. On one occasion it is fixed easily by Monique by removing a squashed cup from the mechanism.

He often uses street slang and does an Ali G-style 'snap' when something amuses or impresses him. He is a fan of conspiracy theories as well as admitting to smoking marijuana.

He is generally concerned for the other characters' well-being, often telling them to 'chill' or hugging them when something bad happens. He is the friendliest towards Sharon of all the smokers, even calling her 'Shazza'. He tends to see the good in everyone, to the extent that he was once sexually molested in a park and believed the man's story that he was holding his penis in order to tell his fortune.

Clint slept with Annie once, sent Lucy Wu into spasms by kissing her, and his biggest ambition is to have a threesome before he is 25. He seems to later be dating Lucy Wu for most of the second series, and she has a pregnancy scare, where it is revealed that Clint's father ran away when he was born. We don't know if Clint stays with Lucy after the scare.

=== Gordon (Mike Walling) ===
Gordon debuts in episode six and features in a further four episodes. Initially a non-smoker who never knew the smoking room existed (even though he's worked for the company for about 20 years) he is an unwelcome and disliked colleague prone to be lecherous, aggressive, insecure and overly-ambitious. Gordon's unpopularity is exemplified when his health takes a turn for the worse in the penultimate episode and his colleagues generally react with indifference, self-interest and a dithering lack of concern, as demonstrated by Sally; "God knows what we'd do in a real emergency".

=== Heidi (Emma Kennedy) ===
Heidi debuts in episode five, when she returns from maternity leave. She is 35, married to Keith (previously married and somewhat older at 58; she virtually worships him) and mother to baby Dane (about whom she obsesses).

Heidi is very 'mumsy' and constantly refers to her seemingly idyllic domestic situation, to the near-universal annoyance of the other characters. It is clear that her home life is not as perfect as she believes. She repeats highly critical comments Keith has made about her as though they were kindly, although she occasionally seems doubtful about his more extreme political views. He hates foreigners, is homophobic, thinks the police should be armed with laser guns that can paralyse and believes Heidi is more than enough female influence for his son. He also encourages Heidi to act out his bizarre sexual fantasies to make their sex life more interesting for himself.

Heidi is a non-smoker and her visits to the smoking room are motivated by her desire to tell everyone about the latest developments in her life, yet she takes very little interest in anyone else's, often having a smug, patronising air about her when she does interact in conversations with the others. However, she is desperate for friends and in episode 10 we learn that her imaginary friend, Buttercup, was cruel to her and soon went off to be imaginary friends with another child. Heidi didn't have the imagination to invent another one. This early disappointment might explain why she is oblivious to the rudeness of others and why she is determined to have company at any cost.

In episode 17, she reveals that she is pregnant with her second child, to the slight annoyance of Janet (because it overshadowed her announcement of her engagement) and Sharon (because of her maternity rights), although the other characters express their joy at her news when they realise it will mean another lengthy maternity absence.

=== Janet (Selina Griffiths) ===
Janet is 34 and the personal assistant to Sharon. She is very prudish, dresses old for her age, rarely swears and does not smoke. Once she takes a drag of Robin's cigarette, only to immediately extinguish it in a cup of coffee, thereby depriving Robin and Clint of their only means of ignition. She is constantly put-upon by Sharon and is terrified of her (although she occasionally tries to stand up for herself). She normally enters the smoking room on company-related matters such as to inform the occupants of Sharon's latest diktat.

She takes a very dim view of some of the other characters' slacking, herself being very diligent and obedient. However, she is not really interested in climbing the career ladder, her stated goal being, '...to find a nice man, and settle down'.

Little is mentioned of her love life; in episode six, she says that she has a date and is reluctant to go out into the driving rain and fetch Sharon's lunch in case it messes up her new hairdo. She later mentions having met a new man at church, followed by her sudden announcement of her engagement to boyfriend Noel.

She is very fond of her family, who include an aunt who suffered from a cerebral aneurysm, a sister, Nicola, an epileptic brother, Stuart, and her nephew Dominic, whom we meet in episode 10. We also learn that Janet was a 'late baby' whose mother always told her she was a 'mistake'.

=== Len (Leslie Schofield) ===
Len is a security guard, is 59 and is widowed. He used to be in the armed forces, although it isn't specified which branch, and only took his current job because of the points on his driving licence which meant he couldn't become a taxi driver. He has a cantankerous personality but is soft beneath the gruff exterior. He has a strange love for the works of Walt Disney, being overjoyed at the thought of holidaying in Walt Disney World in episode seven, although he isn't keen on Minnie Mouse, whom he describes as 'that bitch'. He is also afraid of ducks, claiming he accidentally provoked one into "biting" him on the face.

He raised his two sons on his own following the early death of his beloved wife, Diana, and is very fond of his grandsons. He remains devoted to Diana's memory. He mentions her whenever he can and never shows any interest in other women. In episode 12 we learn that her death hit him so hard that the only thing which could cheer him up was to get a perm. He can be soft and caring to the others on occasion too. He is the one who hurries to comfort Annie when she is crying in episode two and is the only one who is concerned that Lilian should enjoy her birthday in episode eight. He and Lilian have a good friendship, having worked together for so long, but there is never any suggestion of romance between them.

Len swears constantly, even in the middle of words. The other smokers tolerate his quirks, not even batting an eye when he becomes high on glue and hallucinates in episode 10. Janet is the only one to comment on his constant swearing, which offends her prim nature – although on the one occasion when she's driven to strong language, in Episode Nine, he is quick to criticise her for it.

Len can be extremely gullible; for example, he fails to realise that his superior Ranjit is stealing from him and is happy to accept Ranjit's outrageous explanations of how his property keeps disappearing. On the other hand, he can be very incisive and worldly-wise, such as in Episode Two when he muses about the brevity of life. Age is becoming a source of concern for him. He is upset to see a picture of his younger self in episode 12 and complains that he is now falling apart.

=== Lilian (Paula Wilcox) ===
Lilian is 53 and divorced. Her ex-husband, Greg, was an alcoholic and there are suggestions that their marriage was unhappy. She thinks her terrible taste in men means she has a lot in common with Whitney Houston (with whom Lilian shares a birthday). It is explained she spent much of the eighties as a dowdy, overweight mum who put all her energy into raising her daughters (Laura and Julia) and forgot about herself. She lives alone and since her divorce is enjoying a new lease of life. When she agrees to appear in the firm's Christmas pantomime, she chooses to sing Cher's "Believe" and this could easily be her motto.

Lilian dresses young and revealingly and is unreserved, fun-loving, optimistic and outspoken. She is keen to find a man and will seize on virtually any suitable target. She is bubbly and happy on the surface but this masks a sadness which she sometimes lets show, like when she admits she doesn't like living alone.

She is a confirmed smoker, which is illustrated by her attempt to obtain an un-stubbed-out cigarette from the street outside and her near-revulsion when she thinks that Barry is giving up. At the Cigzowt conference, designed to help the smokers quit, she tells how cigarettes have supported her through all the highs and lows in her life and have been her only constant companion. Sadly, the fact that she smokes wrecks any chance of a new romance with the Cigzowt representative, Derek.

=== Robin (Robert Webb) ===
Robin is the closest to the series' central character and is present in the smoking room for almost all of every episode. He is in his early thirties. His job is never specified but he says he works in an office on his own, which he describes as 'solitary confinement' and that his tasks include filing old photographs for the company brochure. He attempts to give Sharon the impression he is hard-working, usually stubbing out his cigarette and making for the door whenever she enters. He is obviously intelligent although not particularly ambitious. He is generally cynical and a little melancholy. The happiest we usually see him is when he encounters or talks about Ben from the Post Room.

His sexuality and attitude towards Ben (from the Post Room) is the subject of an ongoing story thread. There are many hints that Robin is gay and infatuated with Ben, but no outright admission on his part. Robin seems uncomfortable with his sexuality and is keen for everyone to know that the temp, Miranda, was once his girlfriend. The truth is finally discussed openly in the final episode, where it is apparent all his fellow smokers long realised Robin was gay (apart from Barry, who doesn't understand how Robin can be gay when he's 'so good at crosswords') and had no problem with it. He misses out on a chance with Ben who it turns out is gay too but has a new boyfriend by the time Robin comes out.

=== Sally (Nadine Marshall) ===
Sally is 27 and works in the graphics department with Annie. She claims to be Annie's best friend (and constantly beckons Annie with the phrase, "Come on, missus..."), although this statement may have been motivated by Annie having just won two tickets to 'DanceFest UK'. Normally, her relationship with Annie is bitchy and competitive. She often gossips about Annie behind her back, but she will always reluctantly provide a shoulder for Annie to cry on. She seems to have the liveliest social life of all the smokers. She has a very bad hangover when we first meet her in Episode One and in Episode Eleven, when everyone is snowed-in after work, is so determined to drink the bottle of vodka she has bought that she mixes it with the only thing available, a jar of pasta sauce. Despite her smoking and drinking, she is health conscious, being a vegetarian (why she could never eat human flesh) and a devotee of 'boxercise'.

She has little time for the nonsense the others talk, particularly Annie's new age interests. She quickly realises the truth behind Robin's preoccupation with Ben.

Sally tends to speak her mind and isn't afraid of offending people. As a little girl she claims she punched the glove puppet Spit the dog in the face at a Christmas pantomime, breaking Bob Carolgees' hand, because he dared to ask her name. She also says that one man who criticised her had his tyres slashed, although she quickly, and unconvincingly, qualifies that she didn't slash them. She can be thoughtful at times, once agreeing to go to the pub with a lonely Janet, even though they have nothing in common, rather than disappoint her.

=== Sharon (Siobhan Redmond) ===
Sharon is the head of the branch, having worked her way up from being secretary, although she remains answerable to Head Office. Sharon is a cold, condescending, ladder-climbing career woman. She rates herself very highly and virtually everyone else as slacking, inadequate minions. Although a smoker, she spends much less time in the smoking room due to her attitude to work; the other characters feel nervous and intimidated whenever she enters. She constantly bullies Janet and relies on her for almost everything. She also appears to be unable to understand basic social behaviour, remarking once 'Why are there jokes? [Do they] make you feel happy and productive?'

Sharon has probably achieved her position more from her tenacity, forceful personality and compatibility with management culture than her actual ability. For example, in episode two, she makes some shocking assumptions about the poorly written words in Martin's letter thanking the company for his retirement party, insisting the word 'party' is 'pasty'. She is obviously focused and ambitious. It is only when photographs from the company brochure of 1987 are found that we learn that she joined the firm as Barry's secretary. They were firm friends then, according to Barry, but Sharon insists it was only because the other workers were all freaks. They even went on what sounds like a date to Kew Gardens, but Barry bungled the follow-up, waiting at West Ham tube station while Sharon waited, correctly, at West Hampstead. It is suggested that, in those early days, there might have been a chance of romance for the pair but the misunderstanding was never broached and now there is only antagonism.

In episode nine we learn that most of her family are dead. Sharon now lives alone with a cat, which she hasn't bothered to name and to which she only speaks to tell it to get off the sofa. Her cold exterior melts only once, when she is passionately kissed by a kissogram who is taking a break in the smoking room after visiting the woman he is actually there to see. She disappears 'stage left' after him, with Janet remarking, "That's not love – that's pure naked lust!"

=== Monique Coyne (Sunetra Sarker) ===
A career-driven, dynamic woman whose only vice seemed to be smoking. She was introduced in episode one as an external candidate for manager, in competition with Barry. Monique was chosen over Barry and was shown to be good at 'the game,' interacting with Sharon seemingly as equals. Her aptitude frightened Barry when she fixed the coffee machine following Clint's failed attempt.

Monique's only other appearance was in episode eight at Lilian's birthday party, where she confused and was condescending to Barry. In the final episode, Monique is mentioned to have been poached and leaving for another firm in New York, which only confirms Barry's suspicions that she was a disloyal ladder-climber.

Monique would not be considered a main character as she only appeared physically in two episodes. However, she could not be classified as 'unseen,' therefore existing as one of the rare characters in the series to appear more than once, yet not belonging to the core 10 actors.

== Unseen characters ==
The series frequently derives humour from references to unseen characters, partly due to its single location structure:

=== Ben 'from the Post Room' ===
The unwitting object of Robin's lust who, in Robin's eyes, is clearly a closeted gay man, despite having a girlfriend (later his fiancée). A running joke is made of the fact that his face is never seen on screen (e.g. his appearance in a snowman costume, and Lilian accidentally cutting his head off in a photograph), although his voice is heard once, when he is played by series writer Brian Dooley. It is revealed in the final episode that Robin's suspicions were correct; however, Ben was fooled by Robin's over-compensation, and believes him to be homophobic.

=== Tess Pownall ===
Lilian's co-worker and close friend. She is recently widowed but does not seem overly upset by this, planning a holiday with Lilian and even organising a disco and bouncy castle for her husband's wake, though later admitting that this was a mistake. Whilst on holiday with Lilian she insisted on sunbathing topless. However, in the photos Heidi questions why she is holding "two wizened yams".

=== Lucy Wu ===
A girl whose provocative dancing at the office party attracts Clint (despite the fact she was actually in anaphylaxis after accidentally eating a nut). She later has a pregnancy scare, and according to Heidi has already had at least one terminal illness.

=== Martin ===
Barry's boss who retires in episode one, only to collapse with a fatal stroke in Asda the day after his leaving party. According to Lilian and Sally he was something of an office groper, leaving Annie offended that he never tried anything with her. He is also revealed to be the source of a large amount of pornographic emails clogging the company email system. Despite despising golf he was bought a set of clubs to mark the end of his 37 years at the company. His widow is called Pat, who mistook his stroke as being the result of an exceptionally cold freezer at Asda.

=== Ranjit ===
Len's workshy boss. Despite being Head of Security, he frequently steals valuables from a clueless Len.

=== Gerry Lyndop ===
Gerry has a twitch. This developed after having to witness his wife being repeatedly mounted by a runaway horse.

=== Keith ===
Heidi's husband, whom she appears to worship, despite his obvious cruelty towards her, such as telling her he was leaving her as an April fool and only revealing the truth when she lay down in front of the car to stop him going. He is racist, sexist and homophobic, but none of this seems to put Heidi off.

=== Shreela ===
An obese woman dubbed "Shrinking Shreela" after she falls foul of one of Clint's botched repairs and ends up in a coma. Lilian comments on the irony, stating "all those years at Weight Watchers... she doesn't know she's finally thin".

== Episode list ==
=== Series 1 ===
No. overall	No. in series	Title	Original release date
1	1	"Do De Dum De Da"	29 June 2004
Barry believes his interview will be a walkover against an alcoholic co-worker who arrives drunk on interview day – until external candidate Monique turns up. Meanwhile, the smokers grow frustrated at their inability to remember the theme music from Little House on the Prairie.
2	2	"R.I.P"	6 July 2004
One of the office workers drops dead a day after retiring, and his colleagues gather in the smoking room to contemplate mortality and ponder whether they'll get a day off for the funeral. Annie takes the loss particularly badly, Sharon despairs of getting her morbid staff to do any work and Len regales the others with a ghost story.
3	3	"Pantball"	13 July 2004
Sharon tries to encourage the smokers to join in with the office paintball event, but the staff are less than enthusiastic – Annie is in tears over Clint's latest misdemeanours, Len becomes furious when someone signs him up as a joke and Janet's misspelt posters don't whip up any enthusiasm. Only Robin seems keen, seeing an opportunity to resolve his unrequited love in the heat of combat.
4	4	"Light My Fire"	20 July 2004
An important client is unimpressed by the smokers' failure to provide her with a light and storms out of the office. While Janet is fuming at the business implications of this incident, Robin realises the situation is even more serious – if nobody has a light, he won't be able to smoke.
5	5	"Chocolate Box"	27 July 2004
A box of chocolates is left in the smoking room on Valentine's Day, with an ambiguous note addressed to 'the world's most sexiest smoker', prompting the staff to puzzle over who it is meant for. Heidi returns from maternity leave and can't resist treating her co-workers to a blow-by-blow account of the rigours of childbirth.
6	6	"Feeding Time"	3 August 2004
A rainy day forces the smokers to spend their lunch hour indoors, cooped up with the irritating Gordon. Lilian wonders why everyone is fitness mad, especially since Annie's latest exercise craze has left her incapacitated. Janet worries that her life is going nowhere, Robin fights with the drinks machine and Barry has something vitally important to do – he just can't remember what it is.
7	7	"Only Temporary"	10 August 2004
A new female temp joins the team, and while Barry is instantly smitten, Sally resolves to get rid of her. Lilian feels miserable after coming back from her holiday and Robin looks suspiciously tanned.
8	8	"Happy Birthday"	17 August 2004
The smokers reluctantly gather to celebrate Lilian's birthday, but Annie is more concerned with finding herself a man and Robin continues to pine for Ben from the post room. Gordon faces up to his addictions, Sharon tries to bond with the workforce and Barry endures the company of new manager Monique, who never fails to leave him feeling stupid.

=== Christmas special ===
No. overall	No. in series	Title	Original release date
9	-	"Do They Know It's Christmas?"	21 December 2004
Janet is in charge of organising a Christmas Variety Show for the old folks. Strangely, Sharon is in favour of the idea even though it means nobody is working. The old folk, however, prove to be a tough crowd.

=== Series 2 ===
No. overall	No. in series	Title	Original release date
10	1	"Bzzzzzzz"	26 July 2005
Janet's student nephew visits the office to conduct a psychological study, and she recommends he use Robin as his test subject. However, his academic research takes a back seat when the smokers find themselves faced with an angry bee.
11	2	"No Place Like Home"	2 August 2005
Heavy snow causes chaos on the roads and forces staff to linger in the smoking room after hours. Sharon struggles to come up with any small talk as she waits for her car to turn up, and Sally raids her shopping bag for supplies and reveals a bottle of vodka – but the only thing she has to mix it with is pasta sauce.
12	3	"1987"	9 August 2005
Robin finds photographs taken for the company brochure in 1987, which leads the older staff members to reminisce about the past. However, for Sharon the experience dredges up bad memories of working as Barry's secretary – and a terrible misunderstanding that still haunts them both.
13	4	"Smashed"	16 August 2005
The office is broken into and the smoking room vandalised, leaving Sharon determined to unmask the culprit herself. Robin inadvertently appoints himself prime suspect by coming to work nursing a black eye, while Sally and Annie hatch a plan to turn the situation to their advantage.
14	5	"Pity the Fool"	23 August 2005
Head office tries to raise morale by insisting the employees celebrate April Fool's Day. However, Sharon is having none of it, and Janet's efforts to raise a smile with her box of amusing props don't improve her mood. Meanwhile, Clint comes into work depressed, but refuses to tell anyone why.
15	6	"Quitters"	30 August 2005
Sharon organises an anti-smoking seminar for the staff – not so much for their health, but to put an end to their constant breaks. However, the overly cheerful guest speaker leaves everyone more in need of a cigarette than ever before.
16	7	"Last Night a Graphic Designer Saved My Life"	6 September 2005
Sally makes the front page after foiling a mugger. Len and Clint are awestruck by her heroism, Gordon comes up with a plan to exploit her fame, and Robin fears the adulation will go to her head. But an unforeseen disaster soon tests her courage to the limit.
17	8	"Significant Others"	13 September 2005
Janet is thrilled when her boyfriend proposes to her – and her co-workers are equally pleased when she celebrates by treating them to champagne. However, Robin is convinced she is rushing into things and tries to warn her off, leading to a string of secrets being exposed.
