= Mary Dormer Harris =

British local historian (1867–1936)

- Born: 1867 Stoneleigh, Warwickshire, England
- Died: 3 March 1936 (aged 68–69) Royal Leamington Spa, Warwickshire, England
- Resting place: Milverton Cemetery, Royal Leamington Spa
- Occupation: Local History Lecturer at University of Birmingham
- Education: Richmond and Twickenham High School
- Alma mater: Lady Margaret Hall, University of Oxford
- Years active: 1898-1936
- Notable works: Translation of the Coventry Leet Book entries from 1420 to 1555

Mary Dormer Harris (1867–3 March 1936) was a British local historian whose focus was the medieval history of Coventry. She was also a translator, writer and suffragist.

== Early life ==
Harris was born at Dale Farm, Stoneleigh, Warwickshire in 1867. She was educated as a weekly boarder at Richmond and Twickenham High School, then studied English literature at Lady Margaret Hall at the University of Oxford. She achieved first class grades, but was not awarded a degree as women were not allowed to formally graduate until 1920. Harris spoke French, German and Latin. She was called Molly by close friends and had poor eyesight, damaged by her work.

== Activism ==
Harris was a suffragist and joined the National Union of Women’s Suffrage Societies (NUWSS) in 1898. She was active in the Leamington and Warwick branch and wrote letters to the Leamington Spa Courier newspaper campaigning for votes for women. She helped organise local conferences, including a talk given by Millicent Fawcett. She exchanged letters with suffragette leader Christabel Pankhurst and wrote to the Irish playwright George Bernard Shaw seeking his support for women's enfranchisement in 1906.

== Career ==
Harris was a local historian particularly interested in the medieval history of Coventry. From 1904 to 1913, she translated entries from 1420 to 1555 in Latin, Norman French and Early English from the Coventry Leet Book, which she had discovered in the borough archives. She also published numerous books and papers about the history of Warwickshire. She made observations about the origins of conflict in the medieval period between the Coventry's municipality and wards over common land, recorded the misericords made for the Whitefriars, and compared medieval Coventry with the Bavarian city of Nuremberg in Germany.

Harris was the first woman to address the Leamington Literary Society, giving a paper titled Warwickshire Life in Shakespeare’s Day. She was also the first woman to address the Birmingham and Warwickshire Archaeological Society. Women were not permitted to address the Society of Antiquaries, so her paper about Coventry's craft guilds was read on her behalf.

In 1914, Harris was a founding member of the Coventry Guild. In 1916, during World War I, Harris was responsible for moving the Coventry Archives collection to the vault of Lloyds Bank, to prevent the damage or destruction of the documents if there were air raids. She regularly wrote for newspapers such as the Coventry Herald, such as when she published an article about the history and legend of Lady Godiva in 1915 or medieval paintings at Coventry Charterhouse.

Harris was a founding member of the Warwick and Leamington Dramatic Study Club in 1922, the forerunner of the Loft Theatre. She wrote plays for the club, such as The Christmas Mummers at Stoneleigh, based on the local traditional mummers plays. This was published in 1925.

== Legacy ==
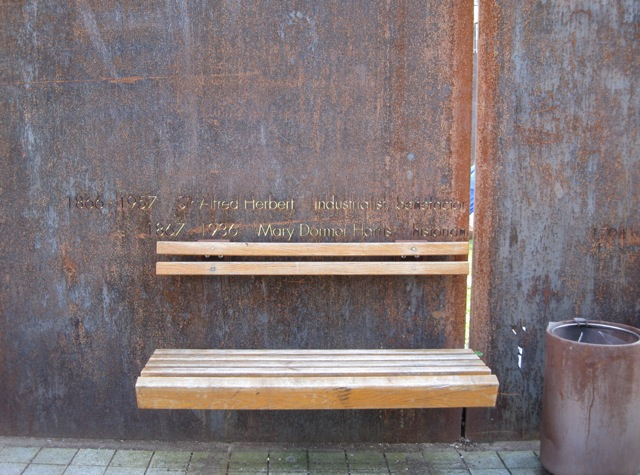
Incised steel slab outside the Herbert Art Gallery and Museum in Coventry commemorating "1866-1957 Sir Alfred Herbert industrialist benefactor" and "1867-1936 Mary Dormer Harris historian"

Harris was working on a volume of Coventry Guild records when she died in 1936, and the work was completed by Phillip Styles and Geoffrey Templeman, her colleagues at the University of Birmingham in the History department. She died due to a traffic accident and was buried at Milverton Cemetery.

In 1938, The Mary Dormer Harris Memorial Bursary was inaugurated at a public meeting at Leamington Town Hall to commemorate her and to provide funds for young students in the study of local history, local drama or musical activities.

Harris is commemorated on an incised steel slab outside the Herbert Art Gallery and Museum in Coventry.

In the Tile Hill suburb of Coventry, Dormer Harris Avenue is named after her. The Leamington Literary Society erected a blue plaque in Harris' memory at her former home in Gaveston Road, Royal Leamington Spa, where she lived with her mother.

== Works ==
- "Laurence Saunders, Citizen of Coventry." The English Historical Review, Vol. 9., No. 36. Oxford University Press. pp. 633–651. ISSN 0013–8266. (1894)
- Life in an Old English Town: A History of Coventry from the Earliest Times. London: Swan Sonnenschein & Co. (1898)
- Medieval Towns: The Story of Coventry. J.M. Dent (1911)
- The Coventry Leet Leet Book or Mayor's Register. Containing the records of the city Court Leet or View of frankpledge, A.D. 1420-1555 with divers other matters. London: The Early English Text Society. (1907–1913)
- "Memoirs of the Right Hon. Edward Hopkins, M. P. for Coventry." The English Historical Review, Vol. 34., No. 136. Oxford University Press. pp. 491–504. ISSN 0013–8266. (1919)
- Dr. Troughton's Sketches of Old Coventry, with descriptive notes by Mary Dormer Harris. B. T. Batsford. (1920)
- A Social and Industrial History of England: Before the Industrial Revolution. Collins. (1920)
- The Ancient Records of Coventry. The Dugdale Society Occasional Papers (1924)
- Unknown Warwickshire, illustrated by James Edward Duggins, London: The Bodley Head (1924)
- The Christmas Mummers at Stoneleigh (play, 1925)
- Some Manors Churches and Villages in Warwickshire with an Account of Certain Older Buildings of Coventry. Coventry City Guild (1927)
- The Register of the Guild of the Holy Trinity, St. Mary, St. John the Baptist and St. Katherine of Coventry. The Dugdale Society (1935)
