= Becoming Human =

2011 British TV comedy-drama series

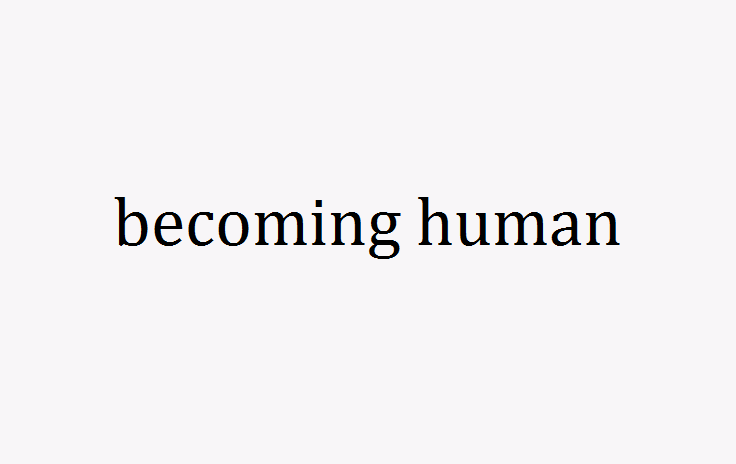
- Genre: Supernatural drama; Comedy-drama
- Created by: Toby Whithouse
- Written by: Brian Dooley, Jamie Mathieson, John Jackson
- Directed by: Alex Kalymnios
- Starring: Craig Roberts; Leila Mimmack; Josh Brown; John Boyega; Emma Rigby
- Country of origin: United Kingdom
- Original language: English
- No. of series: 1

Production
- Cinematography: Tim Palmer (pilot); Nic Morris (series)
- Running time: 50 mins (Full 8 episodes together)
- Production companies: Sullivan Entertainment; Mehra Entertainment

Original release
- Network: BBC iPlayer
- Release: 26 January – 20 March 2011

Becoming Human is a British supernatural comedy-drama television series and a spin-off of the series Being Human. Created by Toby Whithouse, it was directed by Alex Kalymnios, written by Brian Dooley, Jamie Mathieson and John Jackson, and stars Craig Roberts as the teenage vampire Adam (previously seen on Being Human), Leila Mimmack as the werewolf Christa and Josh Brown as the ghost Matt. A compilation of the eight episodes (including the finale) aired on BBC Three on 20 March 2011.

== Plot ==
Becoming Human continues the adventures of Adam, a 46-year-old vampire in the body of a 16-year-old teenager. Adam had been protected by his parents up until they died of old age, following which he had come under the protection and encouragement of Mitchell, Annie, George, and Nina. As Becoming Human begins, Adam has moved elsewhere and is trying to live a normal life as a "human".

On his first day at the school, Adam manages to embarrass and ostracise himself. However, he meets another pupil, Christa, who is hiding the fact that she is a werewolf. Christa has also been being followed by a fat, melancholic teenage boy whom she believes is a stalker but whom no one else can see or hear. Adam realizes that he is a ghost. The ghost introduces himself as Matt and turns out to be a missing student from the school.

Adam quickly realizes that it's because Matt has been murdered at the school toilets, and the three of them set about trying to solve the murder. The task is made more difficult by the fact that Matt's own memories of the event are unclear. Among the suspects Adam and his friends investigate are the school bully Danny Curtis, Brandy Mulligan and Mr. Swan.

A sub-plot of the show deals with the uneasy relationship between the trio, which has elements of a rivalry, friendship and love triangle. It is revealed that Matt had a three-year-long unrequited crush on Christa which ultimately led to him being in the boys' toilets he died in, scribbling "an anonymous declaration of love" on the cubicle wall with a key when the murderer attacked him. It's suggested that Adam and Christa also might have feelings for each other, although both deny it.

Adam frequently makes crude passes at Christa and takes opportunities to kiss her or be seen doing so (for instance, when spying on the gym teacher, Mr. Swan, they are hiding within gym equipment - they cover up their spying by making out). It's unclear whether this is human or vampire-influenced behaviour. Christa, however, outspokenly rejects and dismisses him. In spite of this, Matt is subject to occasional outbursts of jealousy. Adam, meanwhile, is also trying to deal with his vampire urges and is frequently tempted to "punish" the murderer (once they are discovered) by feeding from them, with Christa acting as moral restraint and Matt struggling with his own desires for revenge.

Following several false leads, a major breakthrough is made when Mr. Roe lets slip to the trio that Mr. Swan has ordered him to clean the same boys' toilets that Matt was drowned in. They eventually discover that the CCTV cameras between the toilets and the gym are missing, further implicating Mr Swan in the murder. They begin to suspect that Matt's body is hidden in the gym, because Christa can smell it the day before the full moon. They investigate the gym the night of the full moon - when a werewolf's senses are at their peak - only for Christa to start changing. Matt and Adam discover that they are trapped - someone locked the doors. Matt and Adam lure the transforming Christa into the gym's supply cupboard and barricade the door. In the morning, she is released and they wonder where Matt's body could've been. They initially fear that Christa may have eaten it during her time as a werewolf; but Matt succeeds in finally locating his body-still in the cupboard hidden among cleaning tools.

Mr. Swan finds them and they question him, accusing him of the murder. He tells them that Mr. Roe had keys to the gym and access to the security cameras, and the trio realise that Roe was listening to their conversations the entire time during detention (while pretending to be listening to music on headphones) and had already fed them a false lead regarding Brandy Mulligan. At this point, Roe appears and knocks out Swan with a baseball bat. Matt uses a chalkboard to ask Roe why he committed the murder, and Adam grabs him by the throat as Roe tells them that he was tired of being pushed around by people, so he "pushed back". Someone had apparently keyed Roe's car, and he'd seen Matt running away from the scene (Matt was innocent, though - he was running from the girl's locker room, where he'd been caught peeping). Roe then followed Matt into the toilets and saw Matt carving a symbol of his love for Christa. Roe assumed that Matt was writing yet another insult towards him, so he drowned Matt in a fury.

A furious Adam almost gives in to the urge to bite Roe, but is stopped by Matt. After this, a supernatural "door of death" (the same type that feature in Being Human) materializes for Matt to "move on" through. Matt is reluctant to do so, as he has come to enjoy the company of Adam and Christa - being happier than he'd ever been in his lifetime - and the excitement of the investigation. Roe attacks them in an attempt to get rid of the evidence, but the group wrestles him to Matt's door and Adam throws him through and shuts the door, which vanishes. Matt takes this as evidence that he can stay.

Having now come to terms with his death, Matt gives Adam and Christa his blessing to form a romantic relationship (although they continue to deny their willingness to have one). The episode ends with Adam suggesting that "the other side" may become complicated by having a living person take the place of a dead one, and claiming that "they" may send Roe back (setting up a possible plot-strand for a follow-up series).

== Overview ==
New episodes of Becoming Human premiered on BBC iPlayer from 30 January until 20 March 2011 on the BBC Three Website. A new episode was shown each Sunday.

The writers of the series were Brian Dooley, Jamie Mathieson and John Jackson. The director was Alex Kalymnios. Becoming Human was produced by the Zodiak Media group, Touchpaper Wales. Altogether 1,5 Million viewers saw Becoming Human online. At 20 March 2011 all episodes were cut to a 50-minute special and were broadcast on BBC Three. Various scenes of the series were filmed at the Barry Comprehensive School. After Becoming Human ended, Craig Roberts (Adam) appeared in the episode 4x05 "Hold The Front Page" of Being Human. Furthermore, two blog messages were posted in 2013 on the official Website of Being Human, which describe the fate of the characters Christa and Adam after Becoming Human.

== Additional notes ==
In addition to eight episodes there are also clues consisting of mobile phone videos, suspect profiles, pictures and other side notes released each week between the episodes on the Becoming Human blog, enabling the viewers to investigate Matt's murder in more depth. Among the clues include appeals and missing posters made by Matt's parents, voice messages and videos made by Adam and Christa, and Christa's journal entries. Also, after the online release of the eighth episode, the BBC released an online clip, showing Mr. Roe, communicating to our world through a TV from purgatory, as Annie did at the end of Being Human series 2. During this clip, he was seen to be extremely angry having been thrown over, and promises to return and take revenge on the trio. This has left a possible opening for a second series, although as the last series of Being Human was aired in early 2013 chances of a second series are highly improbable.

== Cast ==
- Craig Roberts as Adam Jacobs
- Leila Mimmack as Christa Stammers
- Josh Brown as Matt Bolton
- Josh Cole as Mr. Roe
- Simon Ludders as Mr. Swan
- Emma Rigby as Brandy Mulligan
- John Boyega as Danny Curtis

== Characters ==
Adam Jacobs

Adam is a 46-year-old vampire in the body of a 16-year-old boy. In Being Human it is shown that his father supplied him with blood until he died, because of this Adam didn't have to kill anyone. After his father died, the werewolves George and Nina take care of him. Later Adam decides to leave George and Nina. He decides to go to school again. At his new high school he meets the ghost Matt and the werewolf Christa.

Adam is stuck in puberty. He always wants to keep the bloodlust at bay which is hard for him.

Actor Craig Roberts describes Adam as a vampire who always talks about sex but never had sex himself. He wants to be accepted by the other students, but uses words from the 80s and is surprised when he doesn't get any reaction towards this. In the Rathborne High School he wants to start a new life.

Christa Stammers

Christa is a werewolf. She only became a werewolf recently, and she finds it hard to accept her fate. After a full moon night Christa can not tell what she has done as a werewolf. She could have acted friendly or killed her whole family. That scares her very much. Christa is one of the best students of the whole school and is involved in a lot of social projects. After becoming a werewolf she gets worse in school and stays by herself.

Actress Leila Mimmack describes Christa as a difficult moody teenager, who is scared of being a werewolf. At first, she is not happy about working together with Adam and Matt. Later however they help her find herself, as a werewolf as well as a teenager.

Matt Bolton

Matt is a ghost. He has been murdered recently and is declared missing. Nobody knows who had murdered Matt, not even Matt himself. When he was still alive Matt was a loner, who was bullied. He has always been in love with Christa, who barely recognised him. As a ghost he can only be seen by supernatural creatures, like the vampire Adam and the werewolf Christa.

Actor Josh Brown describes Matt as a very insecure boy. He is a loner who doesn't know what to do when he talks to somebody. Furthermore, he has been so much used to being ignored that he did not even realise that he had died and became a ghost. Adam and Christa are the first to talk to him, which makes Matt very happy.

Brandy Mulligan

Brandy Mulligan is a popular student and the youngest child of the Crompton family. Many people do not dare to cross paths with this family. There are numerous rumours about the Cromptons, but they cannot be verified. Brandy's father, Jerry, is accused of grievous bodily harm against his alleged victim who is unable to speak and has sustained a fractured jaw. However, witnesses are unwilling to testify against him. To distance herself from her family's name, Brandy Crompton changed her name into Brandy Mulligan. She practises martial arts and has achieved the black belt.

Danny Curtis

Danny Curtis is a bully and a friend of Brandy. By bullying he hides his own insecurity. Danny's father left the family when Danny was still a baby. After this Danny's mother made Danny do some jobs to earn the money for the family. When Christa adds Danny's name to the list of the school's socials projects, like taking care of older people or gardening Danny's behavior begins to change. He becomes the pupil of the month.

Mr Swan

Mr Swan is a sports teacher. He doesn't like his students and bullies the students who are not good in his lessons.

Mr Roe

Mr Roe is teacher at the Rathborne High School. He is very insecure and is bullied by his students and Mr Swan.

== Episodes ==
No.	Title	Directed by	Written by	Original release date
1	"Episode 1"	Alex Kalymnios	Brian Dooley	30 January 2011
The vampire Adam is looking forward to study at Rathborne High School however he has difficulties to get along with the other students. Adam tries to flirt with Brandy Mulligan. Brandy however thinks Adam is strange and a foreign exchange student. Later Adam almost gets into a fight with the school bully Danny. Then Adam and the student & werewolf Christa have detention together. There they meet Matt. Matt is a ghost, he has also been a student, but he was murdered and lost his memories from the day he was killed. Christa and Adam want to help Matt to solve his murder, to let Matt pass into the afterlife.
2	"Episode 2"	Alex Kalymnios	Brian Dooley	6 February 2011
Adam and Christa think that the school bully Danny might have killed Matt, because he was one of the last people to see Matt. Along with Matt, Adam and Christa ask Danny about the day that Matt was murdered. They soon realise that Matt already knew that Danny wasn't the one who has killed Matt and that Matt only wanted to take revenge on Danny, for bullying him.
3	"Episode 3"	Alex Kalymnios	Brian Dooley	13 February 2011
Christa, Adam and Matt try to reconstruct Matt's last day.
4	"Episode 4"	Alex Kalymnios	Jamie Mathieson	20 February 2011
The trio thinks that the student Brandy Mulligan is involved in Matt's murder. She has caught Matt when he looked into the girl's changing room. Furthermore, she is the youngest child of the Crompton family, a family with a big criminal record. The trio soon finds out that Brandy isn't the killer and Christa soon learns that Matt wasn't in love with Brandy but with Christa, for over three years.
5	"Episode 5"	Alex Kalymnios	Jamie Mathieson	27 February 2011
Christa reads a love letter that was written to her by Matt. She is touched by Matt's feelings but doesn't return these feelings.
6	"Episode 6"	Alex Kalymnios	Jamie Mathieson	6 March 2011
Matt, Christa and Adam think that Mr Swan is the killer, they watch him in the gym, but are caught and are sent to detention again.
7	"Episode 7"	Alex Kalymnios	John Jackson	13 March 2011
With the help of Christa's sharpened senses as a werewolf, the trio finds Matt's dead body in the gym.
8	"Episode 8"	Alex Kalymnios	John Jackson	20 March 2011
Soon after finding the body Mr Swan enters the room. When Mr Swan wants to call the police, he is knocked down by Mr Roe who turns out to be the murderer. When Matt's door to the afterlife appears, the trio puts Mr Roe into the door instead of Matt.

=== Specials ===
In addition diary entries by the characters, fictional newspaper articles (e.g. about Matt's disappearance or the crimes of Brandy's father) or profiles of the characters, a few small video specials were published. They are between 20 seconds and 2 minutes long. The specials provide background information on the characters and have been published between the episodes. The last special The Return takes place after the end of the series.

Nr.	Title	Air date	Summary
1	Where's Our Matt?	26 January 2011	Matt's mother films a video wanted message. She asks her son to return home.
2	Danny the Bully	4 February 2011	A video shows how Danny bullies other students.
3	Changing Danny's Ways	8 February 2011	Christa wants to turn Danny into a better human. She adds his name onto a list of social projects of the school, like taking care of older people, a garden club and a school musical.
4	Christa's Voicemail	12 February 2011	Christa believes that Matt has some secrets and tells Adam about this.
5	Brandy's P.E. Records	15 February 2011	Christa searches Mr Swans office about records of Brandy Mulligan. She is caught by Mr Swan. Christa tells him that she wants to join the female football club. Mr Swan believes her.
6	Adam's Find	23 February 2011	Christa has achieved her aim to change Danny. Through his involvement in the social projects he got voted as the pupil of the month. Meanwhile, Adam finds an old picture of Christa.
7	Christa's Anger	23 February 2011	Adam makes fun of Christa and shows her the old picture he has found.
8	Adam's Theory	25 February 2011	Christa doesn't speak with Adam any longer. Adam thinks this is strange and that she might be involved in Matt's murder.
9	Swan vs Roe	1 March 2011	A video shows how Mr Swan shouts at Mr Roe, because Mr Roe is not in control of his own class.
10	Christa on Camera	4 March 2011	Christa and Adam argue with each other.
11	Janitor on CCTV	8 March 2011	Adam looks at video clips from the CCTV camera. The janitor can be seen almost everywhere. Adam thinks that he has found a new suspect.
12	The Return	20 March 2011	Matt's murderer says that he will come back and take revenge.

== Awards and nominations ==
=== Nominations ===
BAFTA Cymru Awards:

- 2012: Digital Creativity & Games (Philip Trethowan, Alex Kalymnios, Hannah Thomas)

Banff Rockie Award:

- 2012: Best Webseries - Fiction (Alex Kalymnios, Hannah Thomas)

== Reception ==
The feedback of the show was positive. 1.5 million fans watched the series and discussed online about the newest hints about the murderer.

Nick Bryan says that Becoming Human has a great humor, and that Craig Roberts portrays Adam very well.

According to Robert William Berg, Becoming Human plays in the same mystical background as the mother series Being Human. However, Becoming Human shows the problems from a different perspective, the perspective of teenagers. The series describes the difficulties of being an adolescent, the social stratification of school cliques, and bullying at school. The writers handle these "very serious issues with a gentle touch and some deft, dark humor without ever making light of these serious issues." However the episodes were written and produced separately, so the episodes don't flow seamlessly into each other. Altogether Becoming Human is a brilliant series with a high quality of writing. Furthermore, it has great main and supporting actors, who show authentic performances.

Dan Owen explains; "Becoming Human is a high-quality series. However, it isn't as sexy, stylish, acerbic, and compelling as the British TV series Misfits." The series is made for a younger audience. Older viewers might not like the series as much as the younger ones.

== See also ==
- List of ghost films
- Vampire film
- List of vampire television series
