= The Five (TV series) =

British mystery thriller miniseries

- Also known as: Harlan Coben's The Five
- Genre: Crime drama Mystery; Thriller
- Created by: Harlan Coben
- Written by: Danny Brocklehurst; Mick Ford; Dan Sefton; John Jackson
- Directed by: Mark Tonderai
- Starring: Tom Cullen; O. T. Fagbenle; Lee Ingleby; Sarah Solemani
- Country of origin: United Kingdom
- Original language: English
- No. of seasons: 1
- No. of episodes: 10

Production
- Executive producers: Jonathan Leather; Danny Brocklehurst; Harlan Coben; Nicola Shindler
- Producer: Karen Lewis
- Production location: United Kingdom
- Running time: 45 minutes
- Production company: Red Picture Company

Original release
- Network: Sky1
- Release: 15 April – 13 May 2016

The Five (also known as Harlan Coben's The Five) is a British mystery thriller miniseries created by crime author Harlan Coben and written by Danny Brocklehurst, Mick Ford, Dan Sefton, and John Jackson. Tom Cullen, O. T. Fagbenle, Lee Ingleby and Sarah Solemani star as childhood friends Mark, Danny, Slade, and Pru, who are reunited when DNA evidence left at a murder scene is revealed to be from Mark's younger brother Jesse, who disappeared twenty years earlier. The series first broadcast on 15 April 2016 on Sky1 and consists of ten episodes, with two episodes broadcast each week consecutively. Set in the fictional town of Westbridge, the series was filmed in Liverpool, Wirral, Runcorn and surrounding areas including Frodsham.

== Plot ==
In 1995, four young school friends, Mark, Danny, Slade and Pru are left traumatized after Mark's five-year-old brother Jesse disappears after playing in the park with them. No trace of Jesse has ever been found. Serial killer Jakob Marosi, who had been charged with five other murders, claimed that he killed Jesse. Jesse's parents, Julie and Alan, had given up all hope of ever finding the boy alive.

Twenty years on, Danny Kenwood is a Detective Sergeant working for Westbridge Police. When he attends the scene of a murder, he finds prostitute Annie Green, who has been brutally attacked with a hammer. A forensic analysis of DNA evidence from the crime scene provides a match for Jesse's DNA. An intricate web of trials and tribulations begins to unfold as the four childhood friends re-unite in the hope of finding Jesse alive.

== Cast ==
=== Main ===
- Tom Cullen as Mark Wells, a lawyer in his 30s who aids in the search for missing people in his spare time
  - Aedan Duckworth as young Mark
  - Haris Giannakopoulos as younger Mark
- O. T. Fagbenle as D.S. Danny Kenwood, a detective working for Westbridge Police
  - Freedom Doran as young Danny
- Lee Ingleby as Slade, a childhood friend of Mark, Danny and Pru, who runs a shelter for vulnerable young people
  - Billy Kennedy as young Slade
- Sarah Solemani as Pru Carew, a doctor who has returned home after living in the United States for fourteen years
  - Megan Bradley as young Pru

=== Supporting ===
- Alfie and Harry Bloor as Jesse Wells, Mark's brother, who has been missing for twenty years
- Don Warrington as Ray Kenwood, a retired police officer and Danny's father, who is suffering from severe Alzheimer's disease
  - Wil Johnson as young Ray
- Lorraine Burroughs as Jennifer Kenwood, Danny's wife
- Alicia Charles as Sarah Kenwood
- Hannah Arterton as D.C. Ally Caine, Danny's partner
- Tom Brittney as D.C. Ken Howells, the lead forensic scientist in Danny's team and Karl's best friend
- Vicky Myers as Selena Callaway, an IT consultant that is found dead
- Honeysuckle Weeks as Laura Marshall, a married woman having an affair with Mark
- Tom Price as Kenton Marshall, Laura's husband and a geography teacher
- Sophia La Porta as Britnay Shearer, a volunteer at Slade's shelter
- Martin McCreadie as D.C. Karl Hatchett, a forensic analyst in Danny's team who is attracted to Ally
  - Arthur Byrne as young Karl
- Geraldine James as Julie Wells, Mark's mother
  - Shauna Macdonald as young Julie
- Syrus Lowe as Larry / Larita, Mark's crossdressing paralegal secretary
- Michael Maloney as Alan Wells, Mark's father
  - Canice Bannon as young Alan
- Jonathan Kerrigan as Stuart Carew, Pru's controlling husband
- Rade Serbedzija as Jakob Marosi, a serial killer convicted of five child murders
  - Dragan Micanovic as young Marosi
- Barnaby Kay as D.I. Liam Townsend, Danny's superior
- Naomi Ackie as Gemma Morgan, a young woman who has been missing for five years
- Sam Swann as Matt Lohan / Mr X, an enigma
- Lee Boardman as Jay Newman, a local record producer with a murky past
- Dylan Jupp as Simon Marshall, Laura and Kenton's son
- Alexa Davies as Alexa Mills, a mysterious girl
- Niall Greig Fulton as Richard Payne, an employee of Porter with a connection to Alexa
- Charles De'Ath as Dominic Porter, the head of an IT firm and Callaway's former employer
- Stephen Boxer as Ron Hatchett, Karl's dying father
- Paul Warriner as Frank Lipton, an old friend of the Wells family

== Episodes ==
No.	Title	Directed by	Written by	British air date	UK viewers (million)
1	"Episode 1"	Mark Tonderai	Danny Brocklehurst	15 April 2016	1.42
In 1995, five-year-old Jesse Wells disappeared whilst playing with his older brother, Mark, and three of his friends. Twenty years later, one of those friends, Detective Sergeant Danny Kenwood, is investigating the murder of prostitute Annie Green, and finds Jesse's DNA at the crime scene. He informs Mark, now a lawyer, and their other two friends, Pru, who is now a doctor, and Slade, who runs a homeless shelter. Convicted child killer Jakob Marosi had admitted to killing Jesse and sticks to his story when Mark visits him in prison. Slade encounters a young woman, Gemma Morgan, who has been missing for five years and claims to have been held with other women, but her presence disturbs Slade's colleague Brit. Slade attends a mysterious meeting in a hotel room, while Danny pursues a murder suspect who may, or may not, be Jesse.
2	"Episode 2"	Mark Tonderai	Danny Brocklehurst	15 April 2016	1.05
Danny arrests a mysterious man whom he suspects committed the murder of Annie Green, for his having her mobile phone in his possession. Mark and his father, Alan, visit the police station to view photos of the man in the hope that he may be Jesse. Having viewed the pictures, they dismiss him as not being Jesse. Whilst in the station, Mark uses his mobile phone to take a sneaky picture of Annie Green's mortuary photo, which is on Danny's desk. Mark and Slade use the photo to carry out their own investigation, and after speaking with a contact from Slade's homeless shelter, discover the victim's real name was Selena Callaway; an IT consultant working for the city. Danny is forced to release his suspect, who gives his name as Joe Hanley, after he claims that he only stole her phone, and there is no further evidence to suggest otherwise. Gemma is reunited with her parents, and subsequently describes to Pru the place in which she was being kept captive. Using the description of the location, Danny and his partner, Ally, search for a place matching the description. They find a house owned by music producer Jay Newman. He invites them inside to show them around and it is revealed that he is holding several young women captive in a soundproof room behind his recording studio. Whilst they are not able to see or hear the women, Danny's suspicions are aroused when he is unable to see any sign of Newman owning a dog, despite a neighbour informing him that Newman walks a dog around his yard at night. He recalls that Gemma had said that her captor sometimes made her wear a collar.
3	"Episode 3"	Mark Tonderai	Dan Sefton	22 April 2016	1.03
Danny and Ally visit Joe Hanley's house to ask further questions, only to find that the Joe Hanley there is not the man they arrested. It transpires that the real Joe Hanley has been blackmailed over his use of escorts and has allowed his identity to be stolen. Mark is called upon by Simon Marshall, the schoolboy son of his ex-lover Laura, to locate his missing father, Kenton. Laura denies any mystery, claiming he is on a business trip, but Simon suspects otherwise. Danny and Ally visit Selena's flat to search for further clues, and in the process, disturb 'Joe Hanley' who assaults Danny and runs off with Selena's laptop. Danny pursues him, but the pursuit ends in tragedy when the man ends up in a coma after a well-meaning citizen uses a wrench to stop him from getting away. Mark, Alan and Julie visit 'Joe Hanley' in hospital to find out if he is Jesse, but Julie is adamant that he is not. 'Joe' regains consciousness and escapes from the hospital. Danny and Ally return to Newman's house, only to find he has been murdered. Whilst there, they discover his captives, one of whom disappeared 5 years prior as a 19yo. Selena's laptop, recovered from 'Joe', turns out to have been wiped, but Ally suggests Selena may have backed up her data. A police technician discovers the backed-up data on the cloud and cracks the password, only to find an auto-delete protocol has been activated. Danny manages to take a photo of a list of names on the screen before all the data is wiped. Jesse's DNA is subsequently found at the scene. Pru, having seen Brit at Slade's request, has an admission for Mark, regarding the day Jesse went missing.
4	"Episode 4"	Mark Tonderai	Mick Ford	22 April 2016	1.01
Pru helps Mark dig for information into the disappearance of Kenton Marshall by posing as his wife and visiting the school Marshall teaches at, under the pretext of them being a married couple with a daughter they are considering enrolling. When asking a group of students if they know Mr Marshall, one of the girls makes a comment suggesting Marshall is sexually involved with a student named Alexa. Mark sneaks into the Head Teacher's office and uses her computer to discover the student's full name is Alexa Mills. He gets her address and goes to her house with Pru, only to be told by Mr and Mrs Mills that they don't have a daughter. Mark goes back to the school and again sneaks into the Head Teacher's office and prints out a scanned copy of Mr Mills' driver's licence which has been lodged as part of Alexa's enrolment paperwork. Upon confronting Mr Mills with this information, Mills reveals he has been blackmailed after being with a prostitute and was forced to sign enrolment paperwork for Alexa. Upon seeing Alexa's photo in the paperwork Mr Mills has, Mark realises that he has seen her somewhere before. Mark is subsequently attacked by a well dressed man who tells him to stay away from Alexa. Meanwhile, Danny and Ally are perplexed when a body is found buried at Newman's house. Danny digs out his father's old case files from the time of Jesse's disappearance, only to find they have been doctored. Mark and Pru go out for drinks and rekindle an old flame. Brit decides she must tell the police about her part in the kidnapping of Newman's captives and goes to the police station, asking for Danny. When told that Danny isn't there, she waits in the foyer for his return. Danny and Ally return with Newman's captives to conduct interviews. One spots Brit and tells her that none of it is her fault and that she should leave. Brit leaves the station but is followed by one of the other captives who is less forgiving. She follows Brit back to the homeless shelter, and attacks her with a knife.
5	"Episode 5"	Mark Tonderai	Danny Brocklehurst	29 April 2016	0.98
Slade finds Brit seriously injured, but alive. Meanwhile, Danny and Ally receive news that the body at the bottom of Jay Newman's garden was a former doctor and convicted serial rapist, Aldaeous Croft. Pru comes to blows with Stuart after staying out all night and sleeping at Mark's. Brit later dies in hospital of her injuries, leaving Slade devastated. Her killer is subsequently arrested. In the hunt to discover who Selena Calloway really was, Mark speaks to a fellow prostitute who reveals that she regularly met her customers in the Envy room at the Old Town Hotel. Mark visits the hotel, only to find a bloodied crime scene, with no victim. Julie confronts a mother at the markets who is haranguing her son. The woman calls Julie an 'old bitch' and Julie slaps her. After some more verbal altercation, the woman headbutts Julie in the face and leaves. Danny and Ally interview Jakob Marosi again, but the interview comes to a sudden halt when Danny reveals that he is the son of the original investigating officer. Slade, devastated by Brit's death, takes off in his van to a remote area and burns some papers and pictures of Brit. Jealous of Pru's relationship with Mark, Stuart uses a tracking programme to follow her movements via her mobile phone. He confronts Mark at his office and warns him to stay away from Pru and to stop contacting her. Later, Pru leaves the house and Stuart tracks her to Mark's apartment. Unbeknownst to Stuart, Pru had arrived in time to see Laura going inside with Mark and so Pru was watching the pair from his outside courtyard. Stuart bangs on the door, and when Mark answers, pushes his way into the flat in a rage. Initially confused when he finds Laura instead of Pru, Stuart sees on his tracking programme that Pru is on the move and rushes outside to see her trying to get away.
6	"Episode 6"	Mark Tonderai	John Jackson	29 April 2016	0.91
Mark, after speaking to a girl at the shelter, follows a friend of Alexa's from school and is led to where she is hiding out. She tells Mark that Selena left her a memory stick with all the information that led to her being murdered. She also tells Mark that Kenton Marshall is her father and that he left Selena after getting her pregnant. She says that she told Kenton everything that had happened and that he had gone to the Old Town Hotel to meet with the people threatening her. Mark takes Alexa back to the shelter but, when she goes outside for a cigarette, a mysterious lady drives up and tells her that if she wants to see her father alive again, she must get in the car and come immediately. As Alexa gets in and is driven off, Mark sees them leave. The mysterious man who assaulted Mark - Payne - also turns up, as does Slade in his van and all three follow the car to the house of Porter, the head of the IT company Selena worked for. Porter has Alexa in the kitchen and demands she give him the encryption code to the memory stick Selena left her, which his crony found hidden in her plaster cast. Matt Lohan aka 'Joe Hanley', who works for Porter, is there as well. Outside, Payne gives Mark and Slade the security code and they break in from the rear of the house whilst Payne enters from the front. Payne enters the kitchen, and during a tense standoff, Porter shoots him in the leg before killing Lohan. In the meantime Slade is captured and brought into the room. Porter says that he intends to kill both of them and blame the murder of Lohan on them and tell the police he acted in self defense. Mark sneaks up behind Porter and overpowers him. He tries to get answers about Jesse from Porter, but before Porter can say anything, Payne picks up the dropped gun and shoots him in the head. After they manage to escape with their lives, Slade takes Mark and Alexa to a safe house where Kenton has been hidden. Slade reveals to Mark that he killed the man who had been sent to the hotel to kill Kenton. He also confesses to Mark that he is the one who is responsible for Jay Newman's murder. Meanwhile, Ally makes a breakthrough in the case after Ray reveals to her the location of the missing files from the Jesse Wells investigation. He had stored them in the basement of his old house, and Danny is able to retrieve them. However, some other items which were stored in the same spot bring back some dark memories for Danny.
7	"Episode 7"	Mark Tonderai	Mick Ford	6 May 2016	0.90
Mark becomes concerned when his parents' house is broken into, and the burglar appears to have only targeted some old family photos left in Jesse's room. Meanwhile, further excavation of Newman's garden uncovers a copy of Gulliver's Travels, which Jesse had on him the day he disappeared. Forensic examination later reveals the book is a reprint from ten years after the disappearance. Danny and the team attend a police charity gig, but are called away when Mark manages to corner the burglary suspect in a disused warehouse nearby.
8	"Episode 8"	Mark Tonderai	Mick Ford	6 May 2016	0.89
Danny and Ally visit Jakob Marosi in prison, where he offers to take them to the place where Jesse's body is buried. Danny agrees, but is angered when initial forensics reveal remains found at the site are those of a young girl, not Jesse. Slade is arrested at the shelter for suspicion of murdering Newman, as his van was seen in the area at the time of death. Slade calls Mark to appear as his attorney but Mark tells the interviewing officers that he is unable to represent Slade as he will be an alibi witness and will testify that Slade was with him for the entire day. Pru receives a call from Stuart who tells her that he is at the airport and is taking their daughter out of the country. Pru has a meltdown and heads to the pub where she meets a stranger who spikes her drink while she's in the toilets. A girl from the shelter witnesses this and calls Slade who arrives in time to stop the stranger taking Pru home. Instead, Slade takes her back to his place and admonishes her for her behaviour and her burgeoning drug habit. Meanwhile, Mark tells Danny about letters that his father received from Marosi in the late 1990s. Forensic examination on one of the remaining envelopes suggests the letters were posted in Malton, 120 miles away. Danny discovers that one of Marosi's prison visitors lives in the village, and sets about tracking her down. When she refuses to give him any information, Danny asks Slade to break into her house to a dig a little deeper. Slade discovers the woman is renting a storage unit and surmises that she's doing so on behalf of Marosi. Mark and Slade break into the storage container and find tapes relating to all of Marosi's victims - including Jesse.
9	"Episode 9"	Mark Tonderai	Danny Brocklehurst	13 May 2016	0.93
Danny views the Marosi tapes. There are three tapes for each child relating to the three 'acts'; Track, Pain, Kill. When Danny and Ally view Jesse's tape, they discover only Act one, 'Track', has any footage, whilst Acts two and three, 'Pain' and 'Kill', are blank. Marosi confirms he did not kill Jesse, because just as he was about to lure him, his father arrived. Alan is arrested and questioned by Danny and Ally. Meanwhile, unable to deal with her feelings any longer, Pru decides to tell Mark that she loves him but their meeting is cut short when Danny phones Mark and tells him that it's important he come to the station immediately. When Mark arrives, Danny tells him they've discovered DNA evidence which suggests Alan was not Jesse's father. Danny and Mark confront Julie, who confirms the evidence, claiming that an old friend, Frank Lipton, with whom she had a brief affair, may be Jesse's father. As Danny and Mark try to track Lipton down, Pru and Ally view CCTV footage of a mobile blood bank that they believe the person who dropped the band-aid at the scene of Selena's murder may have visited. They are shocked when they see someone very familiar wearing the smiley face backpack which Mark previously chased.
10	"Episode 10"	Mark Tonderai	Danny Brocklehurst	13 May 2016	0.93
Slade and Mark interview Frank Lipton, who confirms the events of that day - he saw Jesse alone in the park, talking to Marosi, and took him home to stay with him. At the age of eight, he convinced Jesse to adopt a new name to escape his former life - and from that moment on, he was known as Karl Hatchett. Meanwhile, Danny is forced to confront his own demons when he finally decides to place his father in a care home. When Ally realises that Karl has disappeared, she confronts Ken, who confirms that Karl stumbled upon his real identity after realising that the plaster found at the crime scene, containing Jesse's DNA, was his. Karl had driven a drunk Ken to the crime scene and convinced Ken to let him help with evidence collection despite the fact that Karl was only an analyst, not an actual legal forensic tech. Karl dropped the plaster, contaminating the scene and later convinced Ken to leave his blood at the other crime scene to obfuscate the blood's origin. Ken agreed because Karl being at the original crime scene was his fault and he didn't want to lose his job. While searching for Karl, Pru and Slade find a library card in Karl's car, and discover that he borrowed a copy of Gulliver's Travels from Julie's library just 24 hours earlier, leading Mark back to the spot where Jesse disappeared twenty years ago. Mark, Slade, Pru and Danny reunites with Karl, with their parents soon following and Mark confesses his love to Pru.
