= Adam Randall (director) =

British film and television director

- Born: 3 October 1982 (age 44)
- Occupations: Film and television director
- Years active: 2007–present

Adam Randall (born 3 October 1982) is a British film and television director. He is known for directing the films Level Up (2016), iBoy (2017), I See You (2019) and Night Teeth (2021), as well as the fourth and sixth seasons of the Apple TV+ spy thriller television series Slow Horses (2024, 2026).

At the 77th Primetime Emmy Awards, he won a Primetime Emmy Award in the category Outstanding Directing for a Drama Series for his work on the fourth season of Slow Horses.
