= Loft Theatre Company =

Theatre in Leamington Spa, England

The Loft Theatre Company is a troupe of actors based in Royal Leamington Spa, United Kingdom, founded in 1922. The company is an amateur theatre.

== History ==
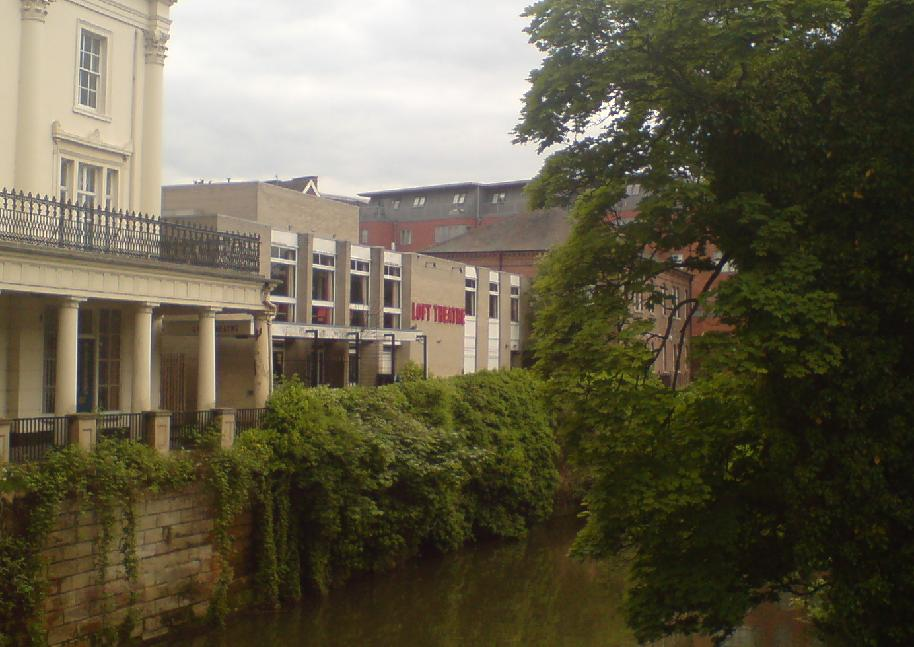
The Loft Theatre by the River Leam

The company was founded on 5 May 1922 by a local reverend, Mr W. A. Constable, and his wife, after a meeting in the neighbouring town of Warwick. Another founding member was Mary Dormer Harris. The original group was called The Warwick and Leamington Dramatic Study Club and its intention was the study of plays and poems, just as much as the performance of them. In these early days the company did not have their own premises so they used various locations around Leamington including the local college, the town hall and The Jephson Gardens. The company moved into its first home, a barn, in 1932. It was from this venue that it got its affectionate name, now its official name, The Loft (after the hay loft in the barn).

The barn was used for nine years after which the company again went 'on tour' until a suitable new venue, the Victorian Grand Pavilion, was found. Situated by the River Leam in the centre of the town this is the current site of the Company. It had previously been used as a roller skating rink and by The Directorate of Camouflage, part of the Ministry of Home Security during World War Two. It was purchased in 1945 by the company, although two fires in 1958 and 1964 meant that the current theatre building replaced it in 1968.

== Facilities ==
The main auditorium holds 200 people and is fully air conditioned. There is a smaller performance space, seating 50, called the Douglas Ford studio.

== Productions ==
The company is run almost exclusively by volunteers and is a registered charity, receiving no funding from external bodies. The company produces around 9 shows a year in the main auditorium and a smaller number in the studio from a wide range of theatrical genres. Unlike many professional theatres some of the actors often join members of the audience for a drink in the bar after a performance.
