= National Book Critics Circle Award for Memoir and Autobiography =

Annual American literary award

- Awarded for: "the finest books and reviews published in English"
- Sponsored by: National Book Critics Circle
- First award: 2005
- Website: https://www.bookcritics.org/awards

The National Book Critics Circle Award for Memoir and Autobiography, established in 2005, is an annual American literary award presented by the National Book Critics Circle (NBCC) to promote "the finest books and reviews published in English." Awards are presented annually to books published in the U.S. during the preceding calendar year in six categories: Fiction, Nonfiction, Poetry, Memoir/Autobiography, Biography, and Criticism. Between 1983 and 2004, the award was presented jointly with biography.

Books previously published in English are not eligible, such as re-issues and paperback editions. They do consider "translations, short story and essay collections, self published books, and any titles that fall under the general categories."

The judges are the volunteer directors of the NBCC who are 24 members serving rotating three-year terms, with eight elected annually by the voting members, namely "professional book review editors and book reviewers." Winners of the awards are announced each year at the NBCC awards ceremony in conjunction with the yearly membership meeting, which takes place in March.

== Recipients ==
National Book Critics Circle Award for Memoir and Autobiography winners and finalists
Year	Author	Title	Result	Ref.
1983	Joyce Johnson	Minor Characters	Winner	
1984	Joseph Frank	Dostoevsky: The Years of Ordeal, 1850–1859	Winner	
1985	Leon Edel	Henry James: A Life	Winner	
1986	Arnold Rampersad	The Life of Langston Hughes, Vol. I: 1902-1941	Winner	
1987	Donald R. Howard	Chaucer: His Life, His Works, His World	Winner	
1988	Richard Ellmann	Oscar Wilde	Winner	
1989	Geoffrey C. Ward	A First-Class Temperament: The Emergence of Franklin Roosevelt	Winner	
1990	Robert A. Caro	Means of Ascent: The Years of Lyndon Johnson, Vol. II	Winner	
1991	Philip Roth	Patrimony: A True Story	Winner	
1992	Carol Brightman	Writing Dangerously: Mary McCarthy and Her World	Winner	
1993	Edmund White	Genet	Winner	
1994	Mikal Gilmore	Shot in the Heart	Winner	
1995	Robert Polito	Savage Art: A Biography of Jim Thompson	Winner	
1996	Frank McCourt	Angela's Ashes	Winner	
1997	James Tobin	Ernie Pyle's War: America's Eyewitness to World War II	Winner	
1998	Sylvia Nasar	A Beautiful Mind	Winner	
1999	Henry Wiencek	The Hairstons: An American Family in Black and White	Winner	
2000	Herbert P. Bix	Hirohito and the Making of Modern Japan	Winner	
2001	Adam Sisman	Boswell's Presumptuous Task: The Making of the Life of Dr.Johnson	Winner	
2002	Janet Browne	Charles Darwin: The Power of Place, Vol. II	Winner	
2003	William Taubman	Khrushchev: The Man and His Era	Winner	
2004	Mark Stevens and Annalyn Swan	De Kooning: An American Master	Winner	
2005	Francine du Plessix Gray	Them: A Memoir of Parents	Winner	
2006	Daniel Mendelsohn	The Lost: A Search for Six of Six Million	Winner	
2007	Edwidge Danticat	Brother, I'm Dying	Winner	
2007	Joshua Clark	Heart Like Water: Surviving Katrina and Life in Its Disaster Zone	Finalist	
2007	Anna Politkovskaya	Russian Diary: A Journalist's Final Account of Life, Corruption and Death in Putin's Russia	Finalist	
2007	Joyce Carol Oates	The Journals of Joyce Carol Oates, 1973–1982	Finalist	
2007	Sara Paretsky	Writing in an Age of Silence	Finalist	
2008	Ariel Sabar	My Father's Paradise: A Son's Search for His Jewish Past in Kurdish Iraq	Winner	
2008	Honor Moore	The Bishop's Daughter	Finalist	
2008	Andrew X. Pham	The Eaves of Heaven	Finalist	
2008	Helene Cooper	The House on Sugar Beach	Finalist	
2008	Rick Bass	Why I Came West	Finalist	
2009	Diana Athill	Somewhere Towards the End	Winner	
2009	Edmund White	City Boy	Finalist	
2009	Kati Marton	Enemies of the People: My Family's Journey to America	Finalist	
2009	Mary Karr	Lit	Finalist	
2009	Debra Gwartney	Live Through This: A Mother's Memoir of Runaway Daughters and Reclaimed Love	Finalist	
2010	Darin Strauss	Half a Life	Winner	
2010	Kai Bird	Crossing Mandelbaum Gate Coming of Age Between the Arabs and Israelis, 1956-1978	Finalist	
2010	Rahna Reiko Rizzuto	Hiroshima in the Morning	Finalist	
2010	Christopher Hitchens	Hitch-22: A Memoir	Finalist	
2010	Patti Smith	Just Kids	Finalist	
2010	David Dow	The Autobiography of an Execution	Finalist	
2011	Mira Bartók	The Memory Palace	Winner	
2011	Sharifa Rhodes-Pitts	Harlem is Nowhere: A Journey to the Mecca of Black America	Finalist	
2011	Luis J. Rodriguez	It Calls You Back: An Odyssey through Love, Addiction, Revolutions, and Healing	Finalist	
2011	Diane Ackerman	One Hundred Names for Love: A Stroke, a Marriage, and the Language of Healing	Finalist	
2011	Deb Olin Unferth	Revolution: The Year I Fell in Love and Went to Join the War	Finalist	
2012	Leanne Shapton	Swimming Studies	Winner	
2012	Anthony Shadid	House of Stone: A Memoir of Home, Family, and a Lost Middle East	Finalist	
2012	Ngugi wa Thiong’o	In the House of the Interpreter	Finalist	
2012	Maureen N. McLane	My Poets	Finalist	
2012	Reyna Grande	The Distance Between Us	Finalist	
2013	Amy Wilentz	Farewell, Fred Voodoo: A Letter From Haiti	Winner	
2013	Jesmyn Ward	Men We Reaped	Finalist	
2013	Aleksandar Hemon	The Book of My Lives	Finalist	
2013	Rebecca Solnit	The Faraway Nearby	Finalist	
2013	Sonali Deraniyagala	Wave	Finalist	
2014	Roz Chast	Can't We Talk About Something More Pleasant?	Winner	
2014	Gary Shteyngart	Little Failure	Finalist	
2014	Lacy M. Johnson	The Other Side	Finalist	
2014	Blake Bailey	The Splendid Things We Planned: A Family Portrait	Finalist	
2014	Meline Toumani	There Was and There Was Not	Finalist	
2015	Margo Jefferson	Negroland: A Memoir	Winner	
2015	George Hodgman	Bettyville	Finalist	
2015	Helen Macdonald	H is for Hawk	Finalist	
2015	Elizabeth Alexander	The Light of the World	Finalist	
2015	Vivian Gornick	The Odd Woman and the City	Finalist	
2016	Hope Jahren	Lab Girl	Winner	
2016	Jenny Diski	In Gratitude	Finalist	
2016	Marion Coutts	The Iceberg	Finalist	
2016	Hisham Matar	The Return: Fathers, Sons and the Land in Between	Finalist	
2016	Kao Kalia Yang	The Song Poet: A Memoir of My Father	Finalist	
2017	Xiaolu Guo	Nine Continents: A Memoir In and Out of China	Winner	
2017	Henry Marsh	Admissions: Life as a Brain Surgeon	Finalist	
2017	Roxane Gay	Hunger: A Memoir of (My) Body	Finalist	
2017	Thi Bui	The Best We Could Do: An Illustrated Memoir	Finalist	
2017	Ludmilla Petrushevskaya	The Girl From the Metropol Hotel: Growing Up in Communist Russia	Finalist	
2018	Nora Krug	Belonging: A German Reckons With History and Home	Winner	
2018	Nicole Chung	All You Can Ever Know: A Memoir	Finalist	
2018	Tara Westover	Educated: A Memoir	Finalist	
2018	Nell Painter	Old in Art School: A Memoir of Starting Over	Finalist	
2018	Richard Beard	The Day That Went Missing: A Family's Story	Finalist	
2018	Rigoberto Gonzalez	What Drowns the Flowers in Your Mouth: A Memoir of Brotherhood	Finalist	
2019	Chanel Miller	Know My Name: A Memoir	Winner	
2019	Ronan Farrow	Catch and Kill: Lies, Spies, and a Conspiracy to Protect Predators	Finalist	
2019	Laura Cumming	Five Days Gone: The Mystery of My Mother's Disappearance as a Child	Finalist	
2019	Mira Jacob	Good Talk: A Memoir in Conversations	Finalist	
2019	Jessica Chiccehitto Hindman	Sounds Like Titanic: A Memoir	Finalist	
2020	Cathy Park Hong	Minor Feelings: An Asian American Reckoning	Winner	
2020	Riva Lehrer	Golem Girl	Finalist	
2020	Alia Volz	Home Baked: My Mom, Marijuana, and the Stoning of San Francisco	Finalist	
2020	Wayétu Moore	The Dragons, The Giant, The Women	Finalist	
2020	Shayla Lawson	This Is Major: Notes on Diana Ross, Dark Girls, and Being Dope	Finalist	
2021	Jeremy Atherton Lin	Gay Bar: Why We Went Out	Winner	
2021	Rodrigo Garcia	A Farewell To Gabo And Mercedes: A Son's Memoir of Gabriel García Márquez and Mercedes Barcha	Finalist	
2021	Doireann Ní Ghríofa	A Ghost in the Throat	Finalist	
2021	Hanif Abdurraqib	A Little Devil in America: Notes in Praise of Black Performance	Finalist	
2021	Albert Samaha	Concepcion: An Immigrant Family's Fortunes	Finalist	
2022	Hua Hsu	Stay True: A Memoir	Winner	
2022	Jazmina Barrera	Linea Nigra: An Essay on Pregnancy and Earthquakes	Finalist	
2022	Dorthe Nors	A Line in the World: A Year on the North Sea Coast	Finalist	
2022	Darryl Pinckney	Come Back in September: A Literary Education on West Sixty-Seventh Street, Manhattan	Finalist	
2022	Ingrid Rojas Contreras	The Man Who Could Move Clouds: A Memoir	Finalist	
2023	Safiya Sinclair	How to Say Babylon: A Memoir	Winner	
2023	Susan Kiyo Ito	I Would Meet You Anywhere: A Memoir	Finalist	
2023	David Mas Masumoto	Secret Harvests: A Hidden Story of Separation and the Resilience of a Family Farm	Finalist	
2023	Ahmed Naji	Rotten Evidence: Reading and Writing in an Egyptian Prison	Finalist	
2023	Matthew Zapruder	Story of a Poem: A Memoir	Finalist	
2024	Alexei Navalny (trans. Arch Tait with Stephen Dalziel)	Patriot: A Memoir	Winner	
2024	Zito Madu	The Minotaur at Calle Lanza	Finalist	
2024	Manjula Martin	The Last Fire Season: A Personal and Pyronatural History	Finalist	
2024	Erika Morillo	Mother Archive: A Dominican Family Memoir	Finalist	
2024	Wei Tchou	Little Seed	Finalist	
2025	Arundhati Roy	Mother Mary Comes to Me	Winner	
2025	Geraldine Brooks	Memorial Days	Finalist	
2025	Beth Macy	Paper Girl: A Memoir of Home and Family in a Fractured America	Finalist	
2025	Hanif Kureishi	Shattered	Finalist	
2025	Miriam Toews	A Truce That Is Not Peace	Finalist	
