= Absurdistan (disambiguation) =

Absurdistan is a fictitious country in which absurdity is the norm, especially in its public authorities and government.

Absurdistan may also refer to:

- Absurdistan (novel), a 2006 novel by Gary Shteyngart
- Absurdistan (film), a 2008 film directed by Veit Helmer
- Absurdistan, a 2002 album by Ada Milea
- Absurdistan, a 1997 album by Laika & the Cosmonauts

== See also ==
- Apsurdistan, a 2013 album by Dubioza Kolektiv
