= The Russian Debutante's Handbook =

2002 novel by Gary Shteyngart

- First edition cover
- Author: Gary Shteyngart
- Language: English
- Genre: Novel
- Publisher: Riverhead
- Publication date: 2002
- Publication place: United States
- Pages: 496 pp
- ISBN: 978-1-57322-988-3
- OCLC: 52723378

The Russian Debutante's Handbook is the debut novel by author Gary Shteyngart, published in 2002. It follows the exploits of young Russians, both in the Alphabet City neighborhood of Manhattan and in the European city of Prava (a pseudonym for Prague).

The novel and its author are parodied in Shteyngart's second novel, Absurdistan, as The Russian Arriviste's Handjob, the work of one "Jerry Shteynfarb" whose writing and character are denigrated on several occasions by the narrator-protagonist of Absurdistan, Misha Vainberg.

== Awards ==
The Russian Debutante's Handbook won the Stephen Crane Award for First Fiction, the Book-of-the-Month Club First Fiction Award and the National Jewish Book Award for Fiction. It was named a New York Times Notable Book and one of the best debuts of the year by The Guardian

== Plot ==
The novel opens on the 25th birthday of its protagonist, Vladimir Girshkin. Vladimir is a Jewish immigrant whose family moved from Russia when he was a boy. The novel begins in 1993, in New York City, where Vladimir works for the Emma Lazarus Immigrant Absorption Society (for a measly $8.00/hour). He shares an apartment with his girlfriend, an overweight redhead named Challah who works as a dominatrix. Vladimir is painfully conscious of his parents' disappointment in his inability to make something more of himself, and spends most of his days in a dull routine. He is approached by an Aleksander Rybakov, an immigrant Vladimir refers to as "The Fan Man", due to the electric fan he carries with him and treats as an old friend. Rybakov introduces himself as the father of the Groundhog, a mafia figure in the Eastern European city of Prava / Prague, referred to in the book as "the Paris of the 90s". He asks for Vladimir's assistance in obtaining full citizenship to the United States, and offers Vladimir compensation (presumably obtained from the Groundhog's business dealings). Vladimir is encouraging but quickly dismisses the old man as mentally ill.

He goes out drinking with his friend Baobab one night, where he meets a young woman named Francesca, who comes from a wealthy family and has attended a prestigious university. Vladimir inserts himself into her social scene and enjoys the attention that comes from being a Russian Jew in such gentile society. Vladimir lives with Francesca and her family for several months. Dating Francesca stretches Vladimir's limited means to such a degree that he is forced to borrow money, first from his parents, and then from Mr. Rybakov. Baobab informs Vladimir that he can get $20,000 by going to Miami and posing as Baobab's boss's son for a college interview. Vladimir readily agrees, despite the deception involved, and finds himself in Miami with Baobab's boss Jordi. Jordi attempts to have sex with Vladimir, who flees in terror and secures a flight back to New York. On the way to the airport, Baobab informs Vladimir that Jordi is an important figure in a Catalan drug cartel who would happily kill Vladimir over such a slip-up.

With help from Baobab's actress girlfriend, Vladimir is able to stage a false naturalization ceremony for Mr. Rybakov back in New York. Immediately thereafter, Vladimir is whisked to Prava as the Groundhog's favored son. Once there, Vladimir proves himself quite resourceful and establishes a Ponzi scheme for the Groundhog, operating under the misnomer PravaInvest. Using his knowledge of English and portraying himself as a wealthy business man, he runs his scam on the significant North American expatriate population living in Prava, including a substantial student population. Vladimir quickly becomes an important figure to these students, and begins dating a young girl from Cleveland named Morgan.

Things seem to be going quite well for Vladimir with the help of his friend Frantisek, who helps to create a false PravaInvest film to secure "investments" for the pyramid scheme. But Mr. Rybakov finds out that he is not a real citizen of the US, and the Groundhog punishes Vladimir by taking him to an unknown city and allowing skinheads to beat him. Vladimir is upset by this and plans an escape from the hospital and from Prava with the help of Frantisek and Morgan. After a lengthy pursuit, Vladimir arrives safely at the airport and goes back to America with Morgan.

== See also ==
- Vera, or Faith by Gary Shteyngart
