= Ben Stiller's unrealized projects =

During his extensive career, American filmmaker Ben Stiller has worked on several projects which never progressed beyond the pre-production stage under his direction. Some of these projects fell into development hell, were officially canceled, were in development limbo or would see life under a different production team.

== As director ==
=== Higher Education ===
On October 2, 1992, Stiller was set to direct Higher Education, Kevin Clancy's After Hours-like road movie, with Stiller executive producing the film in collaboration with Wizan-Black Films and Warner Bros. set to distribute the movie.

=== Smooth Daddy ===
On October 2, 1992, Stiller was set to direct and executive produce Smooth Daddy, Stiller's loosely-autobiographical comedy screenplay, with Warner Bros. set to distribute the movie.

=== Green Acres feature film ===
On December 9, 1997, Stiller was set to executive produce and possibly direct the feature film adaptation of the television series Green Acres, with Red Hour Productions's George Linardos producing with David Permut, and Fox Family Films distributing the film. On October 9, 1998, Robert Cohen was hired to write the screenplay for the Green Acres feature film.

=== What Makes Sammy Run feature film ===
On October 9, 1998, Stiller was set to executive produce and possibly direct the feature film adaptation of Budd Schulberg's novel What Makes Sammy Run, with Stiller co-writing the screenplay with Jerry Stahl, Red Hour Productions' Stuart Cornfield producing, and Warner Bros. distributing the film. On November 8, 2001, DreamWorks Pictures acquired Stiller's adaptation of What Makes Sammy Run, with Stiller confirmed to direct and star from the script he and Stahl, and Gene Kirkwood joined as a producer.

=== The Making of the President, 1789 ===
In June 1999, Stiller was set to direct and executive producing the war comedy film "The Making of the President, 1789" with Larry Arnstein and Marvin Kitman writing the script based on 2 of Kitman's novels, John Cleese attached to star and Steve Martin expressing interest so far, and Ed Solomon and Teddy Lynn's Infinite Monkeys producing in collaboration with Red Hour's Stuart Cornfield, and New Line Cinema handling the film's distribution.

=== American To Err Is Human remake ===
In June 1999, Stiller was set to direct and executive producing the American remake of Sherry Hormann comedy film To Err Is Human with New Line Cinema handling the film's distribution.

=== Help Me Spread Goodness ===
On May 3, 2009, Stiller was set to direct and executive produce Help Me Spread Goodness, Mark Friedman's comedic drama about a Chicago banker who gets swindled in a Nigerian Internet scam, with Red Hour Productions's Stuart Cornfeld producing with Jeremy Kramer, and Participant Media distributing the film.

=== The Mountain ===
On October 20, 2011, Stiller was set to direct The Mountain, Helen Childress' horror screenplay adaptation of Edith Wharton's novel Summer, with Stiller and Stuart Cornfeld producing through Red Hour Productions, and 20th Century Fox distributing the film.

=== All Talk TV series ===
On January 23, 2012, Stiller was set to direct, executive produce, and star in All Talk, the television series adaptation of Jonathan Safran Foer's novel with Alan Alda co-starring with Stiller, Foer executive producing with Red Hour Productions' Stuart Cornfield, Scott Rudin, Eli Bush, and HBO set to broadcast the series.

=== Super Sad True Love Story TV series ===
On January 25, 2016, Stiller was set to direct and executive produce the television series adaptation of Gary Shteyngart's novel Super Sad True Love Story, with Karl Gajdusek writing and executive producing the series with Shteyngart & MRC, and Showtime set to broadcast the series.

=== London film ===
On June 15, 2020, Stiller was set to direct and produce a feature film adaptation of Jo Nesbo's short story "London", with Eric Roth writing the screenplay, Oscar Isaac set to star and produce with Mad Gene Media partner Jason Spire, Nicky Weinstock, Nesbo and Niclas Salomonsson and Lionsgate Films distributing the film, which was likely delayed due to the COVID-19 pandemic, leading to Stiller's casting in Doug Liman's film Locked Down.

=== Rat film ===
On July 10, 2020, Stiller was set to direct, produce and star in the feature film adaptation of Stephen King's short story "Rat". On September 24, 2025, Isaac Ezban took over the project as director, Jeff Howard as the screenwriter, and Jay Van Hoy, Fernando Ferro & Paul Perez will produce the movie without Stiller's involvement due to his involvement with directing “Airman.”

=== Bagman film ===
On February 5, 2021, Stiller was set to direct and produce a feature film adaptation of Rachel Maddow's historical novel/podcast Bagman with Stiller, Adam Perlman & Mike Yarvitz writing the screenplay, Maddow, Lorne Michaels, Yarvitz, Nicky Weinstock, Michael Price, Erin David, Andrew Singer and Josh McLoughlin producing, & Focus Features distributing the film.

=== The Champions feature film ===
On November 11, 2021, Stiller was set to direct, produce and star in a feature film adaptation of The Champions television series with Cate Blanchett as the female lead and an executive producer along with Bradley Fischer, Brian Oliver, Andrew Upton and Coco Francini producing through New Republic Features, Red Hour, Dirty Films and ITV Studios America.

== As producer ==
=== The Kill Martin Club ===
On October 9, 1998, Stiller was set to executive produce John Scott Shepherd's screenplay The Kill Martin Club, with Red Hour Productions' Stuart Cornfield producing and Warner Bros. distributing the film.

=== Untitled supernatural comedy film ===
On October 9, 1998, Stiller was set to executive produce an untitled supernatural comedy with Red Hour Productions' Stuart Cornfield producing and DreamWorks Pictures distributing the film.

=== The Hardy Men ===
On October 9, 1998, Stiller was set to produce Bob Kosberg's action comedy film Hardy Boys sequel idea The Hardy Men through Red Hour and 20th Century Fox distributing the film. On February 13, 2007, The Hardy Men movie was revived with Shawn Levy attached to direct & Stiller and Tom Cruise starring as the grown-up versions of Frank and Joe Hardy reuniting to solve a new mystery. On April 18, 2007, Simon Kinberg was hired to overhaul the film's screenplay with the project expected to begin production in January 2008. On February 13, 2009, Ed Solomon was hired to rewrite the script. In September 2011, Levy said he had still not been able to "crack" the script, and described the project as his "long-gestating tragedy".

=== Karaoke Knight ===
On March 16, 1999, Stiller was set to produce the music comedy film Karaoke Knight, written by Greg Longstreet from a story idea from Longstreet, Seth Jarat & Mark Ezralow, Tom Shadyac possibly attached to direct the film but will produce with Red Hour, Jaret and Ezralow, Stiller to star, & Universal Pictures will distribute the film.

=== Used Guys ===
On June 6, 2002, Stiller was confirmed to produce the sci-fi comedy film Used Guys with Mickey Birnbaum writing the script, Jay Roach directing and producing with Stuart Cornfield, Stiller starring as a lead, and DreamWorks distributing the film. On August 30, 2005, David Guion and Michael Handelman rewriting Mickey Birnbaum's Used Guys script, Jim Carrey starring alongside Stiller, and 20th Century Fox distributing the film instead of DreamWorks. On May 4, 2009, Used Guys was revived with directing duo Jonathan Dayton and Valerie Faris replacing Roach, Stiller was still attached to produce with Stuart Cornfield through Red Hour, Stiller and Reese Witherspoon starring as the leads, and 20th Century Fox distributing the film, and on November 15, 2010, Stiller was still attached to produce with Stuart Cornfield through Red Hour, while Danny McBride joined the cast, and no other announcement has been made since.

=== Date School ===
On November 8, 2001, Stiller was set to produce Date School, a comedy script written by Abby Cohn and Mark Silverstein, and Beau Flynn producing alongside Red Hour's Stuart Cornfield & Rhoades Raider, and DreamWorks Pictures handling the film's distribution, and by October 27, 2004, Tim Story, Jon Favreau, & Miguel Arteta were attached to direct, respectively.

=== Big Wave ===
On March 30, 2006, Stiller was set to produce the sports comedy film Big Wave based on Stiller's concept with The Malloys attached to direct the film for 20th Century Fox to distribute the film.

=== In Deep ===
On June 20, 2007, Stiller was set to produce and potentially star in the George Beckerman/Steve Conrad crime comedy film In Deep with Mark Romanek directing and executive producing with Red Hour Productions' Stuart Cornfield and Robert Weide, & DreamWorks Pictures distributing the film.

=== Pets ===
On September 21, 2007, Stiller was set to produce the sci-fi comedy film Pets through Red Hour with James Gunn attached to write the script & direct, and New Regency distributing the film, which Gunn revealed he left over frustrating creative differences with the studio.

=== Johnny Klutz ===
On March 12, 2008, Stiller was set to produce the comedy film Johnny Klutz through Red Hour with Jay Baruchel to star in with Rob McKlitock writing the script based on Baruchel's concept for Universal Pictures.

=== The Return of King Doug feature film ===
On April 1, 2008, Stiller was set to produce and possibly star in the feature film adaptation of Greg Erb and Jason Oremland's graphic novel The Return of King Doug, with Erb and Oremland writing the screenplay, Stuart Cornfeld, Jeremy Kramer, Peter Schwerin and Closed on Mondays Entertainment's Eric Gitter producing the movie, and DreamWorks Pictures distributing the film. On July 22, 2010, the project was moved from DreamWorks to Paramount Pictures.

=== The Apostles of Infinite Love ===
On December 10, 2008, Stiller was set to produce The Apostles of Infinite Love, a Victoria Strouse screenplay about a family that learns about their daughter joined a suicide cult. On January 14, 2011, Stiller revealed that he was in talks with Richard Ayoade's agent for Ayoade to direct the movie. On August 30, 2011, Ayoade dropped out as the director of The Apostles of Infinite Love.

=== Documental TV pilot/series ===
On November 3, 2010, Stiller was set to executive produce Documental, a half-hour comedy pilot episode from writer-director-EP Justin Theroux who also stars with Steve Coogan, who will also executive produce the series with Red Hour Productions' Stuart Cornfeld, Paul Simms, and 3 Arts Entertainment's Michael Rotenberg & Nick Frenkel, with filming set to start in London and HBO set to broadcast the series, but on January 10, 2011, HBO passed on the pilot episode.

=== Quantum Hoops feature film ===
On August 8, 2011, Stiller was set to produce through Red Hour Quantum Hoops, the sports comedy film based on the documentary of the same name with Stan Chervin writing the script for Walt Disney Pictures to distribute the film.

=== American Le Mac remake ===
On September 1, 2011, Stiller was set to produce through Red Hour Le Mac, the American film adapted from the 2010 French film of the same name with Ed Helms set to star in and produce the film, Johnny Rosenthal writing the script for MRC will produce the film with Red Hour.

=== Pregnancy Pact ===
On September 26, 2011, Stiller was set to produce through Red Hour Pregnancy Pact, Sam Pitman and Adam Cole-Kelly's comedy pitch that is meant for young actors to be cast, Stuart Cornfield and Erica Steinberg will produce the film through Red Hour & New Line Cinema set to distribute the film.

=== American Rentaghost feature film ===
On October 12, 2011, Stiller was set to produce the American feature film adaptation of Rentaghost television series with Thomas Lennon and Robert Ben Garant writing the screenplay, Gail Berman, Lloyd Braun, Kevin McCormick, Patrick Pidgeon and Andrew Mittman will produce in collaboration with Red Hour Productions, and 20th Century Fox was set to distribute after acquiring the film adaptation rights.

=== The Snowy Day ===
On October 20, 2011, Stiller and Stuart Cornfield were set to develop the feature film adaptation of the Ezra Jack Keats children's book The Snowy Day with 20th Century Fox distributing the film.

=== The Flamingo Thief ===
On February 10, 2012, Stiller was set to produce the feature film adaptation of Susan Trott's novel The Flamingo Thief with Michael LeSieur writing the screenplay, Will Ferrell set to star, Stuart Cornfield & Erica Steinberg set to produce through Red Hour in collaboration with Aaron Kaplan and Sean Perrone of Kaplan/Perrone Entertainment. On July 2, 2012, Craig Gillespie was negotiating to direct the film adaptation of Susan Trott's novel The Flamingo Thief, and on July 10, 2020, Steinberg moved The Flamingo Thief from Red Hour to her own company 42mp, with John Lee set to direct and Randall Park & Ken Jeong attached to star.

=== Aloha ===
On July 20, 2012, Stiller was set to produce and star in the Hawaii-set comedy Aloha, written by Nicholas Stoller, with Jonah Hill starring in the project and co-producing the movie, with director Shawn Levy attached to direct, and 20th Century Fox distributing the film. By December 2014, Levy revealed that the project, now titled Why Him?, had been rewritten by John Hamburg, who would also direct and was in the process of casting the film. The film was released in theatres by Fox on December 23, 2016.

=== Sunflower ===
On August 3, 2012, Stiller was set to produce the thriller film Sunflower through Red Hour with Adam Blaiklock to direct from Misha Green's script for 20th Century Fox, however, the film fell into development hell and its fate is unknown after Disney's acquisition of 21st Century Fox was completed, and Green would eventually make the film her feature film directorial debut.

=== Please Knock TV series ===
On September 21, 2012, Stiller was set to executive produce Please Knock, Kevin Napier's single-camera comedy series loosely inspired by Stiller's life story, with Napier executive producing the series with Red Hour Productions' Stuart Cornfeld and Debbie Liebling and ABC set to broadcast the series.

=== The Notorious Mollie Flowers TV series ===
On September 21, 2012, Stiller was set to executive produce The Notorious Mollie Flowers, Adam Resnick's single-camera crime comedy series about a Cape May do-gooder falsely accused of a crime, with Resnick executive producing the series with Red Hour Productions' Stuart Cornfeld and Debbie Liebling and ABC set to broadcast the series.

=== compliKATEd TV series ===
On October 26, 2012, Stiller was set to executive produce compliKATEd, the ensemble comedy television series from writer-executive producing duo Bonnie Hunt and Don Lake, Hunt starring as a woman with a complicated life, Red Hour Productions' Stuart Cornfeld producing the series with Debbie Liebling, and ABC set to broadcast the series.

=== You're Not Doing It Right TV series ===
On December 17, 2012, Stiller was set to executive produce You're Not Doing It Right, Michael Ian Black's comedy series based on Black's book about modern marriage and parenting, who will star in executive produce the series with Ted Schachter and Red Hour Productions' Stuart Cornfeld & Debbie Liebling and ABC set to broadcast the series.

=== Between Two Kings TV series ===
On December 17, 2012, Stiller was set to executive produce Between Two Kings, Jeff Kahn's family comedy series about a divorced and devoted father with sole custody of his 11-year-old son who moves into his narcissistic father's house to care for his ailing dad and finds himself torn between the constant needs of both his self-centered father and his demanding son, with Kahn executive producing the series with Red Hour Productions' Stuart Cornfeld and Debbie Liebling and ABC set to broadcast the series.

=== Brothers of the Bride ===
On September 26, 2014, Stiller was set to produce through Red Hour Brothers of the Bride, P.J. Byrne, Terry Scannell, Aaron Ginsburg and Wade McIntyre's comedy pitch with Bryne set as the lead & New Line Cinema's Dave Neustadter and Walter Hamada were set to oversee the film's production.

=== Start Making Sense TV series ===
On March 26, 2015, Stiller was set to executive produce Start Making Sense, the father-son comedy television series from Jake Fogelnest, with Legendary Television executive producing the series with Stiller's Red Hour Media, and IFC would broadcast the series.

=== Red Shirt ===
On July 24, 2015, Stiller was set to produce Timothy Simons's college football comedy pitch Red Shirt, with Matt Walsh set to star, Stuart Cornfield is producing through Red Hour Productions, and Paramount Pictures distributing.

=== The Sidelines TV series ===
On December 18, 2019, Stiller was set to executive produce The Sidelines, the cheerleader comedy television series from writer-executive producer Kate Gersten with Ali Larter starring and executive producing with Red Hour Productions' Nicky Weinstock, Jackie Cohn, Gail Berman, Alissa Vradenburg, and Laura Vikmanis, and FOX set to broadcast the series.

=== Untitled Andy Siara sci-fi dramedy ===
On January 11, 2021, Stiller was set to produce an untitled sci-ft dramedy film pitched by Raphael Bob-Waksberg, Andy Siara attached to direct, write and produce the film in collaboration with Noah Hawley and Dan Seligmann's 26 Keys, Red Hour, Bob-Waksberg and Andy Samberg, who is also set to star in the film, for Apple TV+.
