= Never Ran, Never Will =

Nonfiction book by Albert Samaha

- Hardcover first edition
- Author: Albert Samaha
- Language: English
- Subject: football, Brooklyn, African Americans, gentrification
- Set in: Brownsville, Brooklyn, New York
- Publisher: PublicAffairs, an imprint of Hachette Book Group
- Publication date: September 4, 2018
- Media type: Hardcover, ebook
- Pages: 368
- Awards: New York Society Library’s 2019 Hornblower Award
- ISBN: 9781610398688
- Website: https://www.hachettebookgroup.com/titles/albert-samaha/never-ran-never-will/9781610398688/?lens=publicaffairs

Never Ran, Never Will: Boyhood and Football in a Changing American Inner City is a debut nonfiction book by Albert Samaha about a youth football team in Brownsville, Brooklyn, New York. The book was published on September 4, 2018, by PublicAffairs. It was named one of Booklist’s Top 10 Sports Nonfiction books of 2018 and received the 2019 New York Society Library Hornblower Award.

== Synopsis ==
The book tells the story of the Mo Better Jaguars, a youth football team in the Brownsville area of Brooklyn, during the 2013–2014 season. The team is composed of players aged 7–13 years old who struggle to win games. Never Ran, Never Will chronicles the efforts of the six team coaches and head coach Chris Legree as they work to keep the young, mostly African American players inspired in a neighborhood undergoing gentrification.

== Awards and nominations ==
- 2019 - PEN/ESPN Literary Sports Writing Award, Finalist
- 2019 - New York Society Library Hornblower Award

For audiobook:

- 2018 - Earphones Award, AudioFile Magazine

== Critical reception ==
Wes Lukowsky wrote for Booklist in a starred review, "Samaha takes readers by the hand and leads them on a visceral tour of a peril-filled world that, nevertheless, thanks to people like Legree, can also become a seeding ground for hope." Publishers Weekly wrote, "At the heart of Samaha's unflinching book are the life-affirming themes of sports, transcendence, courage, and manhood."

== Publication ==
- Samaha, Albert (2018). Never Ran, Never Will: Boyhood and Football in a Changing American Inner City. PublicAffairs. ISBN 9781610398688.
