= Alexandra Constantin =

- Born: 7 July 1988; Bucharest, Romania
- Died: 24 January 2020 (aged 31); Romania
- Education: Karlsruhe Institute of Technology (KIT); University of Architecture "Ion Mincu" in Bucharest; Colegiul German Goethe
- Occupations: Architect, set designer
- Years active: 2015–2020

Alexandra Constantin (7 July 1988 – 24 January 2020) was a Romanian set designer (costumes and sets). She designed the set for the show 'Chiritza in Concert,' directed by Ada Milea at the National Theatre in Cluj, a production that won the UNITER Award for Best Play and Best Actress in a Leading Role in 2019.

A graduate in architecture from KIT University, she started her set designer career by becoming one of the assistants to set designer Adrian Damian. Together with Damian, she created the set for the 2016 show 'The Biggest Gulliver,' directed by Alexandru Dabija at the Gong Theatre in Sibiu. She has designed sets and costumes for productions in theaters in Bucharest, Piatra Neamț, Sibiu, Buzău, and Cluj-Napoca.

She collaborated with big names in the romanian theater industry as Alexandru Dabija, Radu Afrim, Ada Milea, Adrian Damian, Leta Popescu, Slava Sambriș, Bogdan Sărătean, and Cristina Giurgea. She has worked on numerous shows such as "The Government Inspector" (National Theatre Bucharest and UNATC), "The Planet of Lost Dreams" (George Ciprian Theatre, Buzău), "Memories," "Under Every Step There's an Unexploded Mine from a War Unfinished with You," and "Alice" (Youth Theatre, Piatra Neamț), "Chiritza in Concert" (National Theatre Cluj-Napoca), "Love Among People" (Radu Stanca Theatre, Sibiu), and "ImpreLuna" (Ion Creangă Theatre, Bucharest).

== Biography ==
=== Childhood and Youth ===
Alexandra Constantin was born on 7 July 1988 in Bucharest, where she grew up and studied until 2009, when she moved to Karlsruhe, Germany, for her studies. She is the daughter of Radu-Gabriel and Carmen Constantin, and the granddaughter of the romanian writer and literary critic Alexandru George.

=== Higher Education ===
Immediately after graduating from high school in 2007, Alexandra Constantin began her studies at the "Ion Mincu" University of Architecture and Urbanism in Bucharest. After her first two years, moved to Karlsruhe and finished her architecture studies at the Karlsruhe Institute of Technology (2009 - 2014). During her time at university, she enriched her knowledge by participating in various extracurricular courses, such as photography courses (winning first place in 2010 in an architecture photography competition at KIT) In 2017, she began her master's degree in set design at UNATC Bucharest in the class of Prof. Stefan Caragiu. Her dissertation show, "The Government Inspector" created in collaboration with director Slava Sambriș, was very well received by the Bucharest audience and beyond. This show was selected to be part of the 9G season at the National Theatre Bucharest. It also received the award for Best Show of 2019 from UNATC for both directing and set design.

=== Career ===
Upon returning to Romania in 2015, she worked on her first project with director Cristina Giurgea at the National Theatre Bucharest. In 2016, she became the set design assistant to Adrian Damian, with whom she continued her work.

Starting in 2017, she began signing her own set designs, with the play "Humans and their love" ("Iubire la Oameni") by director Bogdan Sărătean.

=== Death ===
During the production of the show "Ubu in Concert" in Cluj, on 24 January 2020, the set designer suffered a fatal car accident on her way to Bucharest. Her funeral took place on 27 January 2020, at Bellu Cemetery, where she rests alongside her grandfather, the writer Alexandru George.

To support young set designers at the beginning of their careers and to honor the memory of Alexandra Constantin, Oistat Romania, in partnership with the Comedy Theatre Bucharest, launched the Alexandra Constantin Scholarship on 7 July 2024, on what would have been her 36th birthday.

== Set and costume designs ==
Year	Role	Title	Organisation
2015	Set Designer	Eden	National Theatre Bucharest, 9G Program in collaboration with UNATC and the Irish Embassy in Romania
2016	Assistant Set Designer	Pipe, Sex and Omlette (Pipa, Sexul si Omleta)	Independent short film
2016	Assistant Set Designer	A Few Conversations About a Very Tall Girl (Cateva conversatii despre o fata foarte inalta)	Independent short film
2016	Assistant Set Designer	The Biggest Gulliver (Cel mai mare Gulliver)	Gong Theatre, Sibiu
2016	Costume Design in collaboration with Diana Ribana	The Guitar's Story (Povestea Chitarei)	Cultural association "Play" and National Theatre "Radu Stanca" Sibiu
2016-2017	Set Design and Costumes	Humans and their love (Iubirea la oameni)	National Theatre "Radu Stanca" in collaboration with "Lucian Blaga" University, Sibiu
2017	Set Design	7 Minutes (7 Minute)	Music video for "Rockabella"
2017	Set Design	Love Love	Music video for "Larisa"
2017	Costume Designer	Gaitele	National Theatre "Marin Sorescu" Craiova
2017	Set Design and Costumes	ImpreLuna	Ion Creangă Theatre, Bucharest
2018	Set Design and Costumes	The Caretaker	UNATC - diploma play
2018	Set Design and Costumes	The Planet of Lost Dreams	George Ciprian Theatre, Buzău and University of Murcia
2018	Set Design and Costumes	Memories (Amintiri)	Youth Theatre, Piatra Neamț
2018	Assistant Set Designer	Eliza dreams (Eliza viseaza)	Ion Creangă Theatre, Bucharest
2018 - 2019	Set Design	The Government Inspector (Revizorul)	UNATC - dissertation play
2019	Set Design and Costumes	Jerusalem	National Theatre "Radu Stanca" Sibiu
2019	Set Design and Costumes	Chiritza in Concert	National Theatre "Lucian Blaga" Cluj
2020	Set Design and Costumes	Ubu in concert	National Theatre "Lucian Blaga" Cluj
