= Lake Success (novel) =

2018 novel by Gary Shteyngart

Lake Success: A Novel
- First edition cover
- Author: Gary Shteyngart
- Cover artist: Rodrigo Corral
- Language: English
- Genre: Novel
- Publisher: Random House
- Publication date: September 4, 2018
- Publication place: United States
- Pages: 352
- ISBN: 978-0812997415

Lake Success is the fourth novel by American writer Gary Shteyngart, published on September 4, 2018. Set in the months before Donald Trump’s 2016 election as president of the United States, it follows a hedge fund manager on a road trip across the country.

== Plot summary ==
A narcissistic Wall Street millionaire hedge fund manager named Barry Cohen, 43, is stressed by an SEC investigation and his young son’s diagnosis of autism. In 2016, his dream of the perfect marriage, the perfect son, and the perfect life implodes, and he flees New York City on a cross-country Greyhound bus trip in search of his long-ago college sweetheart and the ideals of his youth. During the journey, the 2016 presidential election plays out. Meanwhile, his wife, first-generation American Seema, faces her own demons.

== Critical reception ==
In The Guardian, Marcel Theroux described the novel “spiky, timely and true, but also absolutely comfortless. That’s perhaps not surprising, given the times, but it’s also something to do with its choice of central character. The book contains many homages to The Great Gatsby, but it resembles a version of that novel where the lunkish proto-fascist Tom Buchanan is the hero.” Novelist Jonathan Miles, writing in The New York Times Book Review, called it “so pungent, so frisky and so intent on probing the dissonances and delusions — both individual and collective — that grip this strange land getting stranger.”

In The Washington Post, Ron Charles called it a “mature blending of the author’s signature wit and melancholy... Its bold ambition to capture the nation and the era is enriched by its shrewd attention to the challenges and sorrows of parenthood.” In a starred review, Kirkus Reviews called it “as good as anything we've seen from this author: smart, relevant, fundamentally warm-hearted, hilarious of course, and it has a great ending.”

Maureen Corrigan at NPR said Shteyngart's “comic view of the country is, by turns, compassionate and mournful; wickedly satirical and ultimately, aspirational.” In The New York Review of Books, Cathleen Schine wrote that Shteyngart's “plots are clammy, fantastical, a snarl of personal and political absurdity. If he is often overwrought, and he is, he is also sharp and refined in his understanding of self-consciousness. Lake Success is moodier, less showy than his earlier novels, closer in tone to Little Failure, his brilliant, funny, heartbreaking memoir.”

Lake Success made year-end “best books of 2018” lists from The New York Times, Financial Times, The Washington Post, NPR, The Globe and Mail, Mother Jones, Library Journal, and the San Francisco Chronicle.
