= Albert Samaha =

American journalist

- Born: Vallejo, California, U.S.
- Education: University of San Diego (BA); Columbia University Graduate School of Journalism (MS)
- Occupation: Journalist
- Writing career
- Language: English
- Subjects: Culture, inequality, criminal justice, memoir, sports
- Notable work: Never Ran, Never Will
- Website: www.albertsamaha.com

Albert Samaha is an American journalist. He was previously inequality editor at Buzzfeed News and currently works as an investigative reporter in sports at the Washington Post. He is the author of two books, Never Ran, Never Will (2018) and Concepcion (2021).

== Early life and education ==
Samaha was born in Vallejo, California. His mother was born and raised in a wealthy family in the Philippines. Samaha's father is Lebanese, and met his mother in Saudi Arabia when she was a flight attendant. Much of his maternal family immigrated to the United States around the same time as his mother, leaving their comfortable lifestyle behind. This included his uncle, Spanky Rigor, who was a member of the famous Manila sound group VST & Company before moving to America to work as a baggage handler. Samaha's father lived in Paris; his parents divorced when he was a child.

Samaha lived in Manila for kindergarten and then spent the rest of his childhood in northern California. His family moved frequently, living in cities including San Francisco, San Mateo, and Sacramento. Samaha was an athlete in his youth and played basketball, baseball, and football. He received his bachelor's degree in communication studies from the University of San Diego, where he was a defensive back on the football team. He left the football team after two years and switched his focus to journalism. Samaha attended Columbia University Graduate School of Journalism for his master's degree.

== Career ==
Samaha worked at alt weeklies in his early career, including Riverfront Times, San Francisco Weekly, and the Village Voice, where he covered criminal justice and learned the fundamentals of investigative reporting. In 2015 he was hired by Adam Serwer to work at Buzzfeed News just after it launched its criminal justice beat. During his tenure he reported on inequality, culture, and policing.

Samaha's debut book Never Ran, Never Will focused on the Mo Better Jaguars, a youth football team in Brownsville, Brooklyn. He spent two years of time with the players and coaches to prepare the manuscript. The book received a starred review from Booklist, and Samaha won the 2019 New York Society Library Hornblower Award.

Samaha published an essay for Buzzfeed News on the election of Rodrigo Duterte that informed the direction of his second book, a memoir called Concepcion: Conquest, Colonialism, and an Immigrant Family's Fate. The book centers his family's immigration from the Philippines to the United States. Kirkus Reviews described Concepcion as "an edifying, well-written narrative that provides an intimate perspective on the legacy of colonialism." The book is called "Concepcion" after his maternal family's name. Samaha was named a finalist for the National Book Critics Circle Award in Autobiography.

In April 2023 he lost his job when BuzzFeed laid off 15% of the company staff and shut down Buzzfeed News. Samaha joined the Washington Post as an investigative reporter for the sports section in July 2023.

== Accolades ==
- 2018 – Winner, AudioFile Earphones Award (for Never Ran, Never Will audiobook)
- 2019 – Winner, Whiting Creative Nonfiction Grant
- 2019 – Finalist, PEN/ESPN Literary Sports Writing Award (for Never Ran, Never Will)
- 2019 – Winner, New York Society Library Hornblower Award (for Never Ran, Never Will)
- 2021 – Finalist, National Book Critics Circle Award for Memoir and Autobiography (for Concepcion)
- 2023 – Finalist, Livingston Award for Excellence in Local Reporting

== Books ==
- Samaha, Albert (2018-09-04). Never Ran, Never Will: Boyhood and Football in a Changing American Inner City. PublicAffairs. ISBN 9781610398688.
- Samaha, Albert (2021-10-12). Concepcion: Conquest, Colonialism, and an Immigrant Family's Fate. Riverhead Books. ISBN 9780593086087.
