= Elevator (2008 film) =

- Film poster
- Directed by: George Dorobanțu
- Written by: Gabriel Pintilei
- Produced by: Alexandra M. Păun
- Starring: Cristi Petrescu; Iulia Verdeş
- Cinematography: George Dorobanţu
- Edited by: George Dorobanţu
- Music by: Ada Milea
- Release date: April 2008 (Uruguay)
- Running time: 85 minutes
- Country: Romania
- Language: Romanian
- Budget: $300 (est.)

Elevator is a Romanian independent film directed by George Dorobanțu and written by Gabriel Pintilei. The screenplay adapts Pintilei's own 2004 stageplay Elevator, which was inspired by a real story that took place in London in 2002. Both the movie and the play won several national and international awards.

== Background ==
In 2004, during a student party at the Caragiale Academy of Theatrical Arts and Cinematography (UNATC), Gabriel Pintilie began work on what would become the play entitled Elevator. He won the DramAcum2 contest for the play.

Alexandra Păun and George Dorobanţu became interested in the cinematographic adaptation of the play after seeing a stage version directed by Adrian Zaharia, at the Teatrul Foarte Mic theater in Bucharest. In 2005 Păun and Dorobanţu met Gabriel Pintilei. After seeing the performances of Iulia Verdeş and Cristi Petrescu in a performance of the play that Pintilei directed, Păun and Dorobanţu cast the two stage actors in leading, and only, roles in the film.

Principal photography took place during 18 days, in August and September 2005, in the Odeon Theatres cargo elevator. The editing dragged on for 2 years, and Florin Piersic Jr joined during the post-production phase as a technical consultant. Ada Milea composed the score, while the end title's song was written by Dan Lăzărescu.

The film was first screened in 2008 at the International Film Festival of Uruguay.

== Awards ==
- "Best Romanian Debut of 2008" award from Romanian Film Critics Association, Bucharest, Romania (May 2009)
- "Audience Choice Award – Best Film" and "Special Commendation – Best First Film" at South-East European Film Festival, Los Angeles, USA (May 2009)
- "Best Debut Award" at Gopo Awards 2009, Bucharest, Romania (March 2009)
- "Best Editing Award" from Romanian Filmmakers Union – UCIN, Bucharest, Romania (February 2009)
- "Audience Choice Award" (Best feature film made by adults about or for youth) at Auburn Film Festival for Children and Youth, Auburn, Australia (September 2008)
- "Fresh Generation Award" at Fresh Film Fest, Karlovy Vary, Czech Republic (August 2008)
- "Best Romanian Debut Award" at Transilvania International Film Festival, Cluj-Napoca, Romania (June 2008)
