= Xiaolu Guo =

Chinese-British author, filmmaker and academic (born 1973)

Xiaolu Guo FRSL
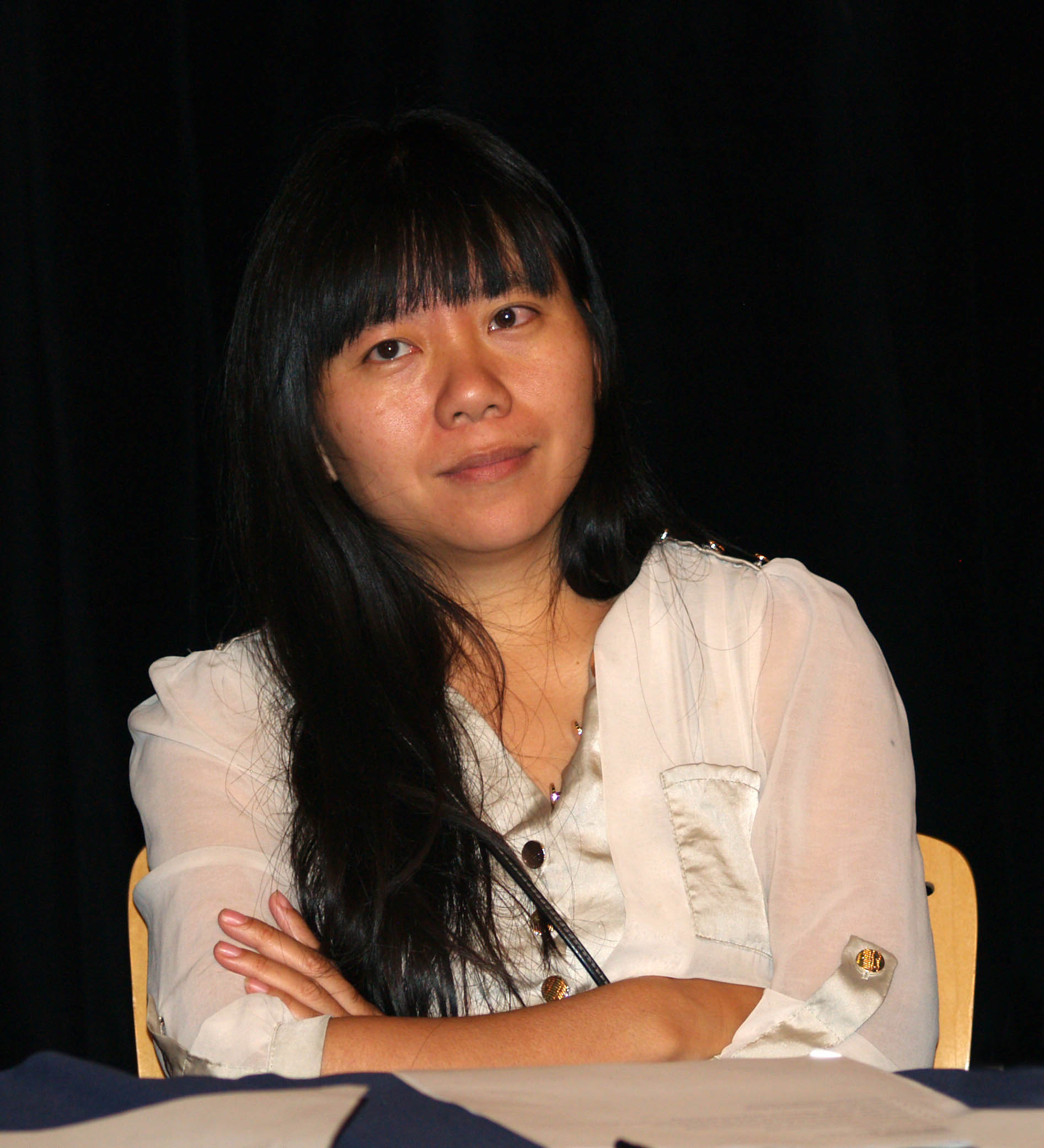
- Guo in 2014
- Born: 20 November 1973 (age 52); China
- Occupations: Author; filmmaker; academic
- Writing career
- Period: 1987–present

Chinese name
- Traditional Chinese: 郭小櫓
- Simplified Chinese: 郭小橹
Transcriptions
Standard Mandarin
- Hanyu Pinyin: Guō Xiǎolǔ
- IPA: [kwó ɕjàʊ.lù]
- Website: guoxiaolu.com

Xiaolu Guo FRSL (Chinese: 郭小橹; born 20 November 1973) is a Chinese-born British author, filmmaker and academic. Her writing and films explore migration, alienation, memory, personal journeys, feminism, translation and transnational identities.

Guo has directed a dozen films, including documentaries and fiction. Her best-known films include She, a Chinese and We Went to Wonderland. Her novels have been translated into 28 languages. Nine Continents: A Memoir in and out of China won the National Book Critics Circle Award 2017. In 2013, she was named as one of Granta magazine's Best of Young British Novelists, a list drawn up once a decade. She was an inaugural fellow of the Columbia Institute of Ideas and Imagination in Paris, France, in 2018, and a jury member for the Man Booker Prize 2019.

== Early life ==
Xiaolu Guo grew up with her illiterate grandparents in a village of fishermen in Shitang, then with her parents and brother in the city of Wenling, both in the Chinese coastal province of Zhejiang. Her father was a traditional landscape ink painter and her mother was a Red Guard during the Cultural Revolution. Guo published her first poetry collection in her teens while studying ink painting. In 1993, she left her province to study at the Beijing Film Academy (in the same class as Jia Zhangke). In 2002, Guo moved to London to study Documentary Directing at the National Film and Television School. She has lived in Paris, Zurich and Berlin.

== Career ==
Xiaolu Guo has served on the judging panel for the Independent Foreign Fiction Prize and in 2016 she served as a jury for the Financial Times Emerging Voices Awards for Fiction. She has lectured on creative writing and film-making at King's College, London, the University of Westminster, Zurich University, Bern University, Swarthmore College, and Harvard University. She is an honorary professor at the University of Nottingham and a guest professor at the University of Bern in Switzerland. Guo was a guest of the DAAD Artists-in-Residence programme in Berlin in 2012 and a Writer-in-Residence of the Literaturhaus Zurich and the PWG Foundation in Zurich in 2015. In 2020–2021, she was Writer-in-Residence of East Asian Department, Columbia University.

=== Books ===
Guo's 2005 autobiographical novel, Village of Stone, focuses on two people, Coral and Red, who live together in Beijing, and how Coral's life changes one day when she receives a dried eel in the post, an anonymous gift from someone in her remote home village. Doris Lessing spoke highly of the book in 2004: "Reading it rather like finding yourself in a dream." The Times Literary Supplement praised the novel: "The language has the pared-down simplicity of a fable; the effect is a bit like that of a Haruki Murakami novel."

Guo's 2008 novel, A Concise Chinese-English Dictionary for Lovers, is the first one that she wrote in English after publishing several Chinese books. It tells the journey of a young Chinese woman in London. She soon renames herself "Z" and her encounters with an unnamed Englishman spur both of them to explore their own sense of identity. The novel is written in the heroine's broken English to begin with, in a dictionary form. With each chapter, her English gradually improves, reflecting the improvement of the heroine's own English over the year in which the novel is set. American writer Ursula Le Guin reviewed the book in The Guardian, stating: "We're in the hands of someone who knows how to tell a story [...] It succeeds in luring the western reader into an alien way of thinking: a trick only novels can pull off, and indeed one of their finest tricks."

Guo's 2009 novel UFO in Her Eyes, set in a semi-real Chinese village, is an experimental meta-fiction in the form of a series of police interviews about an alleged UFO sighting. The novel was adapted into a feature film, produced by filmmaker Fatih Akin and directed by Xiaolu Guo herself. It received the Best Script Prize at the Hamburg International Film Festival.

Guo's 2010 novel, 20 Fragments of a Ravenous Youth, is a coming-of-age story about a 21-year-old Chinese woman called Fenfang, from her life as a film extra in Beijing, to where she has travelled far to seek her fortune, only to encounter a Communist regime that has outworn its welcome, a city in varying degrees of development, and sexism more in keeping with her peasant upbringing than the country's supposedly progressive capital.

Guo's 2010 book, Lovers in the Age of Indifference, is a collection of short stories that depicts the lives of people adrift between the West and the East, set in various locations.

In 2015, Xiaolu Guo published the novel I Am China, which she describes as "a parallel story about two Chinese lovers in exile – the external and internal exile that I had felt since leaving China". In the book, the London-based literary translator Iona Kirkpatrick discovers a story of romance and revolution as she translates a collection of letters and diaries by a Chinese punk musician named Kublai Jian. Unbeknownst to Iona, Jian has come to Britain seeking political asylum, while another character, Mu, is in Beijing trying to track him down. As the translator tracks the lovers' 20-year relationship, she develops a sense of purpose in deciding to bring Jian and Mu together again before it is too late. The novel was one of NPR's Best Books of 2014.

In 2017, she published her memoir Once Upon a Time in the East (the US edition entitled Nine Continents: A Memoir in and out of China) which received the 2017 National Book Critics Circle Award for Autobiography. The memoir is a chronicle of Guo's growing up in China in the 1970s and '80s and her journey to the West.

In 2020, her novel A Lover's Discourse was released by Grove Atlantic in the US and Penguin Random House (Chatto) in the UK, and was shortlisted for the 2020 Goldsmiths Prize.

In 2021, her nonfiction Radical: A Life of My Own was released by Grove Atlantic in the US and Penguin Random House (Chatto) in the UK. It was followed by My Battle of Hastings in August 2024.

In 2025, her novel Call Me Ishmaelle, a retelling of Herman Melville's Moby Dick, was released by Chatto & Windus in the UK, and Grove Atlantic in the US in 2026. It was the New York Times Editor's Pick in January 2026.

=== Films ===
Guo's 2004 film is The Concrete Revolution, a film essay about the construction workers in Beijing building stadiums for the 2008 Olympics. It received the Grand Prix at the International Human Rights Film Festival in Paris, 2005, and Special Mention at the Chicago Documentary Film Festival.

Guo's 2006 film, How Is Your Fish Today?, inspired by Alain Robbe-Grillet's Trans-Europ-Express (1966), is a docu-drama set in modern China, focusing on the intertwined stories of two main characters: a frustrated writer (Rao Hui) and the subject of his latest film script, Lin Hao (Zijiang Yang). It was selected for the Official Competition at Sundance Film Festival 2007 and Rotterdam Film Festival, and received the Grand Prix at International Women's Film Festival in France.

Guo's 2008 film, We Went to Wonderland, is a black-and-white essay film focusing on two elderly Chinese communists who arrive in the rundown East End of London and comment on the Western world from their astonished Chinese perspective. The film premiered at the Rotterdam IFFR and was immediately picked for the 2008 New Directors/New Films Festival of the MoMA / Lincoln Film Society in New York.

Guo's 2009 feature, She, a Chinese, is a homage to Jean-Luc Godard's La Chinoise. This film won the Golden Leopard at the 2009 Locarno International Film Festival and the Best Script Award at the Hamburg Film Festival 2010. It has been distributed in the UK, France, Spain, Germany and Switzerland.

Guo's other 2009 film, Once Upon a Time Proletarian, is a sister-film to She, a Chinese. This documentary looks at China in the post-Marxist era and examines different social classes in the society. It premieres at the Venice Film Festival 2009 and has been shown at Rotterdam IFFR and Sheffield DocFest.

Guo's 2011 fiction feature, UFO in Her Eyes, is a cinematic adaptation of her novel of the same title. The film stars Chinese actress Shi Ke and German cult figure Udo Kier and is a political metaphor recounted through the transformation that befalls a small Chinese village after an alleged UFO sighting. Inspired by Soviet cinema, Xiaolu Guo dedicated this film to Soy Cuba, a banned 1964 Soviet-Cuban film directed by Mikhail Kalatozov. It received the Public Award at the Milan 3-Continental Film Festival 2013.

Guo's 2013 film, Late at Night, Voices of Ordinary Madness, focuses on Britain's underclass society, each fighting their ground in their own way. It is the second part of Guo's Tomorrow trilogy, continued after her documentary Once Upon a Time Proletarian. It premiered at the 57th BFI London Film Festival 2013 and the Rotterdam Film Festival 2014, and was exhibited at the National Gallery of Art in Washington, DC.

Guo's 2018 documentary feature film, Five Men and a Caravaggio, is inspired by Walter Benjamin's landmark essay "The Work of Art in the Age of Mechanical Reproduction" (1936). It premiered at the BFI London Film Festival 2018 and the Athens Avant-Garde Film Festival in Greece, 2018.

In 2020, Guo collaborated with the American Vietnamese filmmaker Trinh T. Minh-ha on Trinh's new film What About China?.

Her 2025 documentary Three Ways of Returning (in collabaration with Andrea Luka Zimmerman and Mania Akbari) was premiered at the Rotterdam Film Festival 2026.

== Awards and nominations ==
Guo's third novel, A Concise Chinese-English Dictionary for Lovers, inspired by Roland Barthes's work, written originally in broken English, was nominated for the 2007 Orange Prize for Fiction and has been translated into 26 languages. She was also the 2005 Pearl Award (UK) winner for Creative Excellence. Her first novel, Village of Stone, was nominated for the Independent Foreign Fiction Prize as well as the International Dublin Literary Awards. Guo writes in both English and Chinese, and has served as a jury member for the Independent Foreign Fiction Prize and the International Dublin Literary Award. Her 2014 novel I Am China, set in Europe, China and America, was awarded the Italian Giuseppe Acerbi Prize in the special category for young readers in 2015 and was longlisted for the 2015 Women's Prize for Fiction.

Her 2017 book Nine Continents: A Memoir in and out of China was the winner in the autobiography category of the National Books Critics Circle Award. It was shortlisted for the Costa Book Award for Biography and Ondaatje Prize 2017.

Her feature film She, a Chinese premiered at the 2009 Locarno International Film Festival, where it immediately took the highest prize, the Golden Leopard. Her previous feature How Is Your Fish Today was an Official Selection at the 2007 Sundance Film Festival and received the Grand Jury Prize at the 2007 Créteil International Women's Film Festival in Paris. Her documentary We Went to Wonderland (2008) was selected for the New Directors/New Films Festival at the MoMA/Lincoln Center in New York in 2008. The Concrete Revolution premiered at the Margaret Mead Film Festival and International Documentary Film Festival 2005, among others. Once Upon a Time Proletarian was premiered at Venice Film Festival and Toronto International Film Festival 2009, and received the Grand Prix de Geneva at the Documentary Forum Rencontres Media Nord-Sud in Switzerland in 2012. She was awarded the Gilda Film Prize for her film career at the 37th Florence International Cinema and Women Festival in Italy, in 2015.

Guo has had film retrospectives at the Cinéma du Réel in the Pompidou Center in 2010, the Swiss Film Archive in 2011, the Greek Film Archive in Athens in 2018 and London's Whitechapel Gallery in 2019.

In 2014, Guo was included in the BBC's 100 Women.

In 2020, she was longlisted for the Orwell Prize for Political Fiction and shortlisted for the Goldsmiths Prize for A Lover's Discourse.

In 2022, Guo was commissioned by the Swiss Television RSI and Locarno Film Festival to direct a short documentary Rocks Remember. She was elected a Fellow of the Royal Society of Literature in the same year.

=== List of awards ===
- 2008: Orange Prize for Fiction shortlist, A Concise Chinese-English Dictionary for Lovers
- 2013: Granta "Best of Young British Novelists"
- 2017: National Book Critics Circle Award for Autobiography, Nine Continents
- 2017: Costa Book Award for Biography shortlist, Once Upon a Time in the East
- 2018: Ondaatje Prize shortlist, Once Upon a Time in the East
- 2018: Rathbones Folio Prize shortlist, Once Upon a Time in the East

== Bibliography in Chinese ==
- Poetry Collection (诗集, Shījí) (1991).
- Who Is My Mother's Boyfriend? (我妈妈的男朋友是谁？, Wǒ māmā de nán péngyǒu shì shéi?) (screenplay collection, 1998).
- Flying in My Dreams (梦中或不是梦中的飞行, Mèng zhōng huò bùshì mèng zhōng de fēixíng) (essay collection, 1999).
- Fenfang's 37.2 Degrees (芬芳的37.2度 Fēnfāng de 37.2 dù) (2000). Translated as 20 Fragments of a Ravenous Youth (2008)
- Film Notes (电影理论笔记, Diànyǐng lǐlùn bǐjì) (film critics, 2001).
- Movie Map (电影地图, Diànyǐng dìtú) (film critics, 2001).
- Village of Stone (我心中的石头镇, Wǒ xīnzhōng de shítou zhèn) (2003).

== Bibliography in English ==
=== Novels ===
- —— (2007). A Concise Chinese-English Dictionary for Lovers (hardcover 1st ed.). London: Chatto & Windus. ISBN 9780701181147.
- —— (2008). 20 Fragments of a Ravenous Youth (hardcover 1st ed.). London: Chatto & Windus. ISBN 9780701181550.
- —— (2009). UFO in Her Eyes (hardcover 1st ed.). London: Chatto & Windus. ISBN 9780701183356.
- —— (2014). I Am China (hardcover 1st ed.). London: Chatto & Windus. ISBN 9780701188191.
- —— (2020). A Lover's Discourse (hardcover 1st ed.). London: Chatto & Windus. ISBN 9781784743499.
- —— (2025). Call Me Ishmaelle (hardcover 1st ed.). London: Chatto & Windus. ISBN 9780802166494.

=== Short story collections ===
- —— (2010). Lovers in the Age of Indifference (paperback ed.). London: Chatto & Windus. ISBN 9780701184834.

=== Memoirs ===
- First memoir:
  - —— (2017). Once Upon a Time in the East: A Story of Growing Up (hardcover 1st ed.). London: Chatto & Windus. ISBN 9781784740672. UK
  - —— (2017). Nine Continents: A Memoir in and out of China (hardcover 1st ed.). New York: Grove Press. ISBN 9780802127136. US
- Second memoir:
  - —— (2023). Radical: A Life of My Own (hardcover 1st ed.). London: Chatto & Windus. ISBN 9781784744861. UK
  - —— (2023). Radical: A Life of My Own (hardcover 1st ed.). New York: Grove Press. ISBN 9780802161567. US
- Third memoir:
  - —— (2024). My Battle of Hastings (hardcover 1st ed.). London: Chatto & Windus. ISBN 9781784745370. UK

== Essays ==
- A Soul In Sakhalin (2009), first published on BBC 3, The Essay
- Further Notes Towards a Metaphysical Cinema Manifesto (2010)
- Notes Towards a Metaphysical Cinema Manifesto (2010)
- Beyond Dissidence (2012), first published in The Independent
- Coolies (2013), 14-18 NOW
- Memories of An Island (2014), Dark Mountain, Issue 7
- The Vital Ingredient (2014), first published in The Economist
- Reading Howl in China (2014), first published in Aeon Magazine
- Waiting for the Second Renaissance (2014)
- The Ying and Yang of Heidi (2016), Viceversa Literatur
- My Writing Day (2016), The Guardian
- Fishermen Always Eat Fish Eyes First (2017), Freeman's #3: Home
- On Self-Translation (2023), Lit Hub
- Everyday Tang: On What We Can Learn From a Dynasty, 2026, ISBN 9781912559756.

== Filmography ==
=== As director, producer and screenwriter ===
- Far and Near (Documentary Essay, 2003)
- The Concrete Revolution (Documentary, 2004)
- How Is Your Fish Today? (Fiction Feature, 2006)
- Address Unknown (Fiction short, Visual Essay 2007)
- We Went to Wonderland (Documentary, 2008)
- An Archeologist's Sunday (Fiction Short, 2008)
- Once Upon a Time Proletarian (Documentary, 2009)
- She, a Chinese (Fiction Feature, 2009)
- UFO in Her Eyes (Fiction Feature, 2011)
- Late at Night - Voices of Ordinary Madness (Documentary, 2013)
- Five Men And A Caravaggio (Documentary reconstruction, 2018)
- Rocks Remember (Documentary, 2022)

=== As screenwriter ===
- Love in the Internet Age (Wangluo shidai de aiqing) (1998)
- The House (Menghuan tianyuan) (1999)

=== As playwright ===
- Beijing's Slowest Elevator (2009), BBC Radio 3
- Dostoevsky and the Chickens (2014), BBC Radio 3, the Wire

=== Awards ===
- UFO in Her Eyes

Public Award, Milan 3 Continents International Film Festival, 2010 City of Venice Award (2nd Prize), Premio Città di Venezia, 70a Mostra Internazionale d'Arte Cinematografica 2013

- She, A Chinese

Golden Leopard Award (Grand Prix) in the International Competition, Locarno International Film Festival 2009. Mount Blanc Prize for the Best Script, Hamburg Film Festival 2009.

- Once Upon a Time Proletarian

Grand Prix de Geneva, Forum 2011. Nomination, Horizon Award, Venice Film Festival 2009

- How Is Your Fish Today?

Grand Prix, Créteil International Women's Film Festival 2007, France; Nominated, Best Drama at Sundance Film Festival 2007; Special Mention at the Rotterdam Film Festival's Tiger Award 2007, Special Mention at the Pesaro Film Festival 2007 and the Fribourg Film Festival 2007.

- The Concrete Revolution

Grand Prix, International Human Rights Film Festival, Paris 2005; Nomination Best Documentary at Chicago Documentary Film Festival 2005; Special Jury Prize at EBS International Documentary Festival, Seoul 2005

- Far and Near

ICA Beck's Future Student Prize 2003, Institute of Contemporary Arts, London
