= Frank Barna Bigelow =

American librarian (1869–1949)

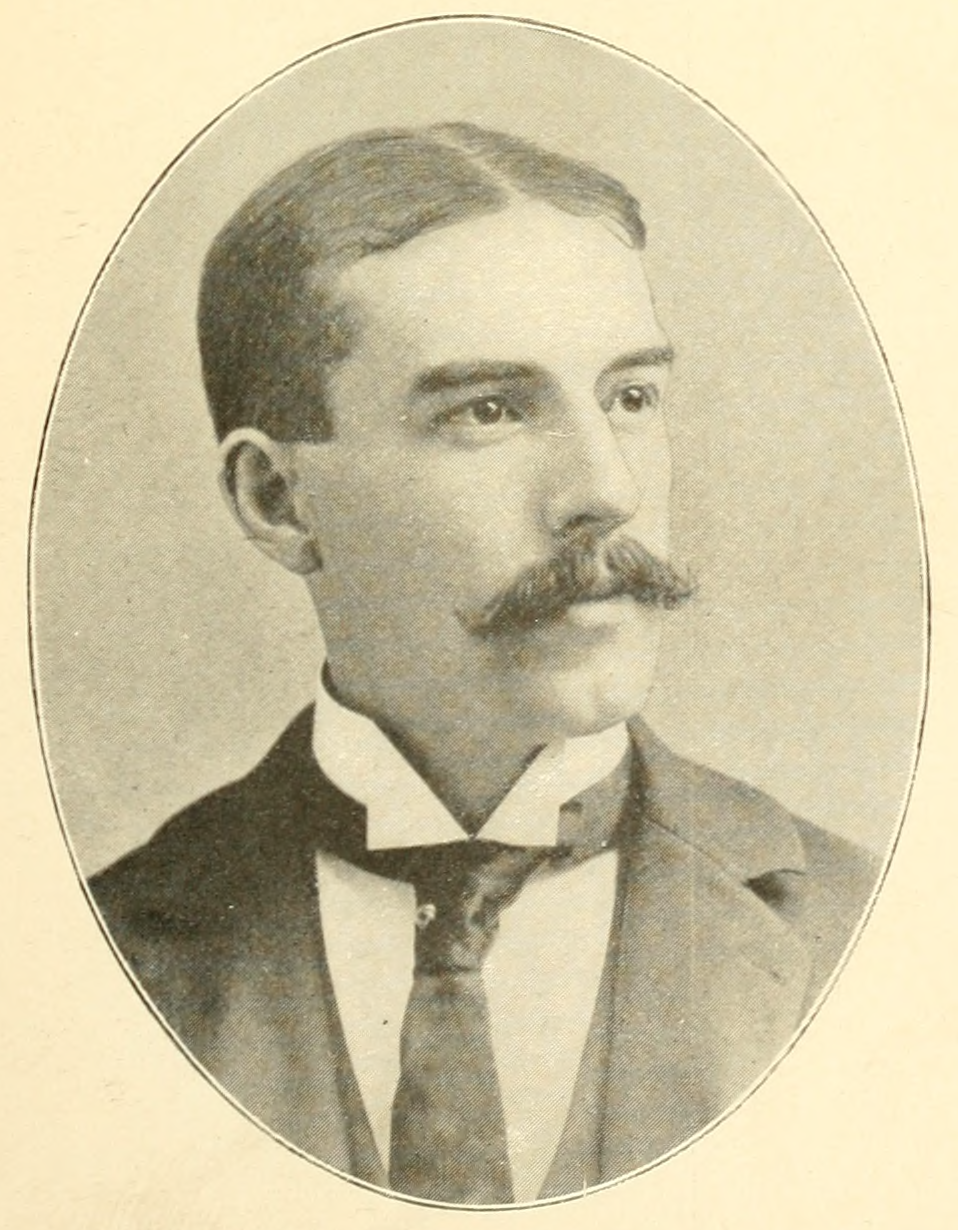
- Born: February 7, 1869; Amherst
- Died: May 30, 1949; Amherst
- Education: Amherst College
- Occupation: Librarian
- Employers: Columbia University; New York Society Library

Frank Barna Bigelow (7 February 1869 – 30 May 1949) was an American librarian.

Frank Barna was born at Amherst, Massachusetts, Feb. 7, 1869, third child of six of prominent Amherst physician Orvis Furman Bigelow, M.D. and Mary Helen (Pingry) Bigelow; grandson of Judge William Morrill Pingry of Vermont; and nephew of California Forty-niner Adoniram Judson Biglow (sic), having sailed on a clipper ship around Cape Horn which docked in San Francisco on 10 October 1849.

Frank Barna was educated at the schools of Amherst and was graduated from Amherst College in 1891. In February 1892, he was appointed assistant librarian at the Columbia College library, and in May 1895, transferred to the New York Society Library to succeed Wentworth S. Butler as head librarian. He held that post until 1937. The New York Society Library, New York City's oldest cultural institution, founded in 1754, served as the de facto library of Congress in the first years of the Constitution until the establishment of the Library of Congress in 1800.
