= Vera, or Faith =

2025 novel by Gary Shteyngart

- 2025 Random House book jacket
- Author: Gary Shteyngart
- Audio read by: Shannon Tyo
- Genre: Comedic-dystopian Novel
- Set in: New York City, U.S.
- Published: July 8, 2025
- Publisher: Random House
- Publication place: United States
- Media type: Print, E-book, Audio
- Pages: 256
- Awards: Most anticipated book: The New York Times, Time, The Washington Post, The Boston Globe, Town & Country, Minneapolis Star Tribune.
- ISBN: 978-0-59359-509-1
- OCLC: 1461833025
- Website: Official website

Vera, or Faith is a 2025 novel written by Gary Shteyngart. This comedic and dystopian novel is set in the near future. It is about a ten year old Korean-American girl named Vera living in a dystopian United States, and about how her family functions within a declining democracy. It was originally published by Random House.

== Plot summary ==
Vera Bradford-Shmulkin is a 10-year-old living in a near-future New York City with her family, which includes her Russian immigrant father, Igor (a magazine editor), her stepmother Anne, and her younger half-brother, Dylan. They own a self-driving car called Stella and an AI chessboard named Kaspie that serves as a knowledgeable companion. Vera's biological mother, a Korean American referred to as "Mom Mom", is absent, and Vera knows little about her.

She only knows that her parents met at a college in the state of Ohio, which her father sarcastically derides in Vera's presence as "the College of Fading Repute". The story is told from Vera's perspective, with quoted words and phrases indicating entries from her "Things I Still Need to Know Diary". According to Marion Winik, writing for the Minnesota Star Tribune, this is a small novel but a lot happens, such as "there will be a road trip, a reunion, a violent showdown, some very sad news, [and] some very good news."

The short chapters are each named after an item on Vera's never-ending mental to-do list, which underscores her self-imposed burdens, such as keeping her family unified, enduring school recess, simply falling asleep, burying a significant secret to get through each day, and maintaining a cool façade for her classmates. These chapter-names reflect her inner turmoil.

=== Vera's father ===
According to Dwight Garner, writing for the New York Times, this novel introduces a new character named Igor Shmulkin as Vera's father, a writer and magazine editor based in Manhattan. He is also described as very depressed, frequently passing gas, and disheveled. He wears hipster satchels and smokes a lot of marijuana. Like the author, Shteyngart, part of Shmulkin's identity is as a martini drinker and an online "manfluencer" for expensive pens. In comparison, Shteyngart collects flashy watches. Shmulkin also collects trivial grievances and has a large ego that fills the family's small New York apartment.

Garner also says that Shmulkin has an odd but pronounced relationship with bookshelves. When visiting others' homes, he tells his children to check if the spine of their host's copy of Robert Caro's book, The Power Broker, is broken. Before hosting their own parties, his wife pays their children to make sure of the arrangement of their books, placing those by women and people of color at eye level to enhance her progressive image.

According to Allison Arieff of the San Francisco Chronicle, Shmulkin is also seriously "preoccupied with selling his literary magazine to 'that Rhodesian billionaire who would make them comfortable and unafraid.'”

Vera adores her father. However, according to Ron Charles of the Washington Post, Vera's deep affection for her father cannot hide his true nature. He is a vainglorious "snob". He constantly tries to enhance his image as a public intellectual, declaiming liberal clichés and cynical remarks. Charles also says that seeing this self-centered man through his adoring daughter's eyes only makes his unpleasantness more apparent, making his eventual downfall all the more painful to watch.

=== "Five-Three" amendment ===
An element central to the plot, is what is sometimes called in the narrative, the "Five-Three" amendment, which would result in an amendment to the United States Constitution if it passes. Constitutional conventions are about to be held by the individual states. The proposed amendment introduces a change to five-thirds votes for certain people, rather than the normal one person-one vote system.

This proposed constitutional amendment would result in an enhanced ballot that counts as five-thirds of a regular vote for so-called "exceptional Americans". These are individuals descended from white settlers who came to America before or during the Revolutionary War and were not enslaved, or who "were exceptional enough not to arrive in chains". Vera is ironically chosen to defend this amendment in a fifth-grade school debate, despite the fact that she herself would be relegated to second-class citizenship.

== Connections ==
There are correlations between this novel and other works, including Shteyngart's previous works.

=== Ada, or Ardor ===
Dwight Garner notices correlations between Vladimir Nabokov's work and this novel. The title seems to reference Vladimir Nabokov's 1969 novel, Ada, or Ardor. That is a story about cousins who fall in love throughout their lives, only to find out they are siblings. While not exact parallels, Shteyngart's novel shares some resemblances with Nabokov's work.

According to Garner, both books have themes of taboo desires and parents who are not who they appear to be. Also, both novels have elements of science fiction and unconventional forms of communication. Furthermore, the character Vera in Shteyngart's novel wears bow ties, a detail that is shared by a character in Ada, or Ardor. Nabokov himself noticed that bow ties look like butterflies, his favorite insects. Finally, Vera was also the name of Nabokov's wife, adding another layer to the Nabokov connection. And Garner says that there are more connections with Nabokov and, so, it is probable that some future graduate student will "compile a list of such resemblances".

=== Prophet Song ===
Ron Charles says that Paul Lynch's novel, Prophet Song, and Gary Shteyngart's novel, Vera, or Faith, both have a vision of American society's decline. Charles says that while both novels seem to be different, they both demonstrate how families live through democracy's drop-off into fascism. Lynch's novel chronicles an expansion of terror. Shteyngart, however, portrays this societal decay through the eyes of a 10-year-old girl, with the harsh realities of the world eventually breaking through her sheltered existence.

=== The Power Broker ===
A real life, 1975 Pulitzer Prize-winning biography of Robert Moses, entitled The Power Broker by Robert Caro, is humorously of central concern to Igor Shmulkin, the father of this fictional family.

=== A familiar character ===
Allison Arieff says that readers of the author's (Gary Shteyngart) other works will find Igor Shmulkin, a character in Vera, or Faith, quite familiar. Shmulkin expresses two recurring elements in Shteyngart's work. These elements are the father figure and political turmoil. These themes have appeared in various forms throughout his previous writings.

For instance, Shteyngart's novel Super Sad True Love Story, is prescient and humorous. This book centers on Leonard "Lenny" Abramov. Lenny works for a company selling immortality to wealthy individuals while his adopted country, the United States, contentiously struggles with totalitarianism and economic collapse.

Also, in Shteyngart's memoir, Little Failure, he recalls how it was for him, growing up as a Russian Jewish immigrant in the United States. In this memoir, his mother nicknamed him "Failurchka" (Little Failure) and she emphasized that she wanted him to become a lawyer. Both of these previous works demonstrate that the presence of paternal relationships and societal disarray, occur over and over, and that these are again seen in Vera, or Faith.

== Reception ==
Carol Iaciofano Aucoin, commenting for WBUR-FM, says: "Because Shteyngart lands one beautifully crafted phrase after another, you're both entertained by and made very aware of how mysterious adult argot can be to children....[and] Shteyngart did not need more than a slip of a novel to create a spirited young girl courageously moving forward through a world that is completely believable in its absurdity."

Marion Winik says "this is probably the most endearing book about anxiety ever written. We are all Vera... And at the end of the day, the book is about realizing you may not actually have to do everything you think you have to do, because you are already loved."

Dwight Garner says that this small novel is one of Shteyngart’s darkest works. It presents an oppressive and problematic America where "the unthinkable has become the inevitable." Yet, according to Garner, dystopian works in general seem overused. He says that the story oscillates between tragedy and comedy. It lacks the usual vitality of Shteyngart’s best works, and "there is no driving emotional energy to replace it." Vera’s underdeveloped sense of herself almost keeps you engaged, "but not really and not quite." Still, he says, no Shteyngart novel is completely a negative experience.

Ron Charles notices that "Few novelists risk jumping on the runaway horse of contemporary life as recklessly as Gary Shteyngart. For the fiction writer, stuck at the plodding speed of publishing, such a maneuver requires gauging both political velocity and cultural direction. And yet, book after book, Shteyngart arrives just where — and when — we need him to."

Winnie Wang, writing for the Toronto Star, says that "Shteyngart sustains Vera's interiority, inviting readers into the mind of a child who is bright and exuberant, yet ultimately vulnerable and helpless within the structures of centuries-old institutions... [and generally] Shteyngart's latest novel is a charming, bittersweet coming-of-age narrative that seamlessly incorporates the ridiculousness of American politics into a bildungsroman with heart."
