= Absurdistan =

Satirical term for countries where absurdity is seen as near-normal

Absurdistan is a term sometimes used to satirically describe a country in which absurdity is the norm due to the ubiquity and incompetence of its bureaucracy. The expression was originally used by Eastern bloc dissidents to refer to parts (or all) of the Soviet Union and its satellite states, but has remained common in post-communist discourse as well.

== Origins ==
The first known printed use of the word Absurdistan appeared in 1971 in the German monthly Politische Studien "... erkennen wir, dass wir uns hier in Absurdistan bewegen". Later, in Czech, the term Absurdistán was used by dissident and later president Václav Havel. This seems to indicate that use of the term began during perestroika. The first recorded printed use of the term in English was in Spectator in an article on August 26, 1989, about Czechoslovakia (Czechoslovaks have taken to calling their country "Absurdistan" because everyday life there has long resembled the "Theatre of the Absurd".) On September 18, 1989, an article in The Nation was called Prague Summer of '89: Journey to Absurdistan. On August 30, 1990, The New York Times used it in an article about the Soviet Union, and a January 18, 1990, Village Voice interview with Havel by Bonnie Sue Stein and Vit Horejs was headlined "The New King of Absurdistan".

== Other uses ==
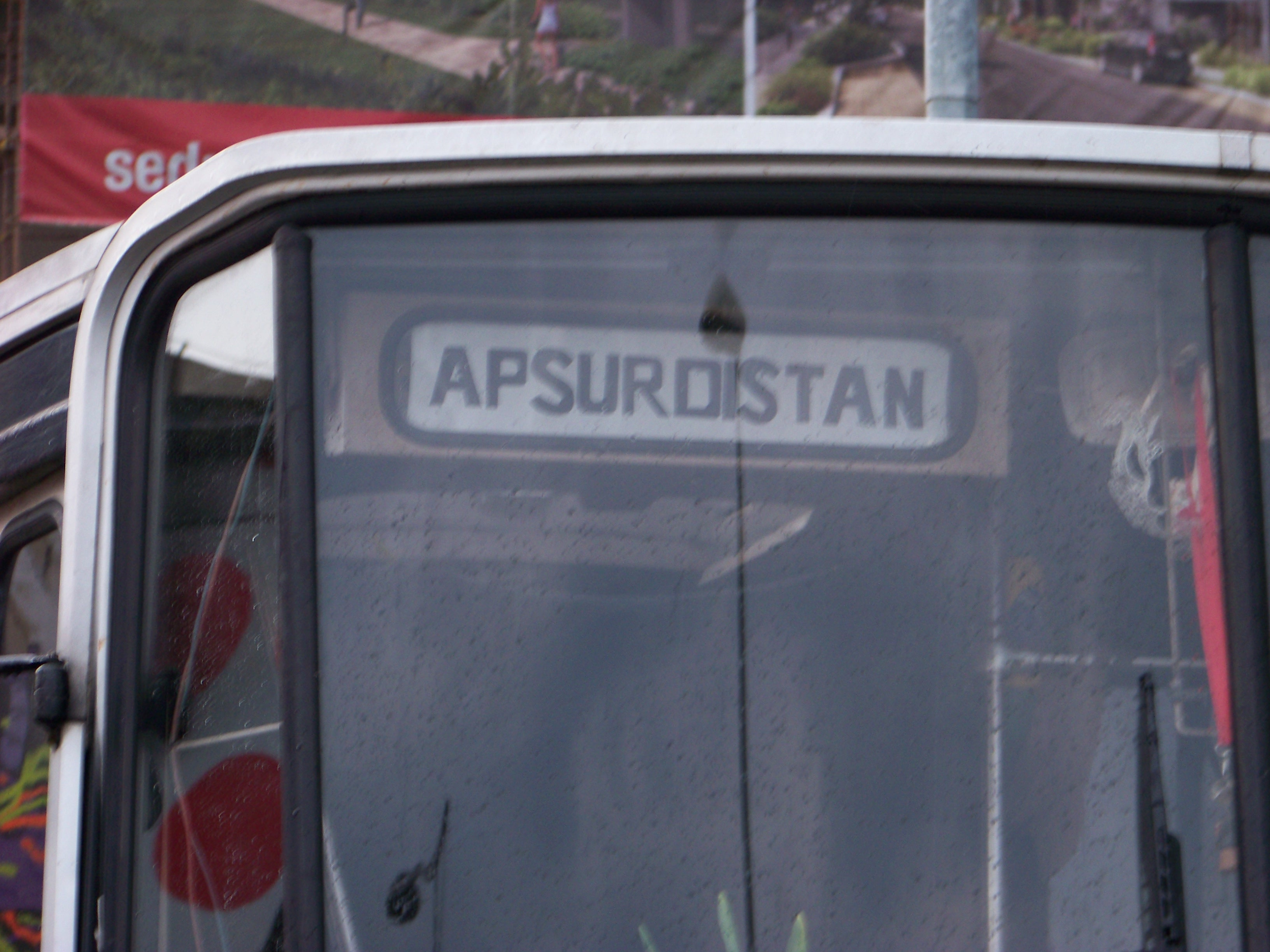
A French bus DA-591-TG parked in Prague near the Trafačka art gallery

After its original reference to countries like Afghanistan, Kazakhstan and others ending in -stan in ironical use for the collapsing Eastern bloc, the term was extended to other countries. The term has been used in several titles of movies, books, and articles:

- The German comic book Abenteuer in Absurdistan mit Micky Maus (Germany 1993, volume 189 of the comic series "Walt Disneys Lustiges Taschenbuch").
- Welcome to Absurdistan: Ukraine, the Soviet Disunion and the West by Lubomyr Luciuk, 1994 (ISBN 096941255X).
- Hazám, Abszurdisztán (Absurdistan, my Home) is a book by Lajos Grendel, Bratislava, 1998 (ISBN 807149206X).
- Geboren in Absurdistan, 1999 Austrian movie.
- The album Absurdistan by Romanian artist Ada Milea (2002)
- Absurdistan is an account of the author's experiences as an Australian Broadcasting Corporation foreign correspondent, including a detailed account of the death of his cameraman and his injury as a result of a car bomb during the 2003 invasion of Iraq.
- Absurdistan, a 2006 satirical novel by Gary Shteyngart set in a fictional former Soviet republic.
- Absurdistan, a 2008 film directed by Veit Helmer.
- Apsurdistan is the name of the 2013 music album of the Bosnian band Dubioza kolektiv.
- Absurdistán is the title of the Czech release of the movie Idiocracy, as distributed by the Bontonfim company.
- Abszurdisztán is the name of a song from the album "Pont" (2015) by the hungarian punk band, HétköznaPICSAlódások [hu]. In this context, it refers the Orbán-regime.

== See also ==
- -stan
- Banana republic
- Lower Slobbovia
- Molvania
- Orientalism
- Radio Yerevan joke
