= How Is Your Fish Today? =

- Promotional poster
- Directed by: Xiaolu Guo
- Written by: Xiaolu Guo; Hui Rao
- Produced by: Xiaolu Guo; Jess Search
- Starring: Xiaolu Guo; Ning Hao; Hui Rao; Zijiang Yang
- Edited by: Emiliano Battista
- Music by: Matt Scott
- Distributed by: Forward Entertainment
- Release date: January 18, 2007
- Running time: 83 minutes
- Country: China
- Language: Mandarin

How Is Your Fish Today?, also known as Jin Tian De Yu Zen Me Yang?, is a 2007 Chinese film written by Xiaolu Guo and Hui Rao. It was directed by Guo. The film is a drama set in modern China, focusing on the intertwined stories of two main characters; a frustrated writer (Hui Rao) and the subject of his latest work, Lin Hao (Zijiang Yang). How Is Your Fish Today won 4 international awards and was well received by critics, but was not commercially successful.

== Cast ==
- Hui Rao as himself
- Zijiang Yang as Lin Hao
- Xiaolu Guo as Mimi
- Ning Hao as Hu Ning

== Reception ==
How Is Your Fish Today? was consistently given good ratings by reviewers, but still remains fairly unpopular.

=== Critics ===
On its release, How Is Your Fish Today? was received well by critics, who applauded the film as an impressive debut from Guo.

=== Awards ===
- "Grand Prix" at the 2007 Créteil International Women's Film Festival
- Special Mention at the 2007 Fribourg International Film Festival
- Special Mention at the 2007 Pesaro International Film Festival of New Cinema
- NETPAC Special Mention at the 2007 Rotterdam International Film Festival

=== Nominations ===
- "Tiger Award" at the 2007 Rotterdam International Film Festival
- "Grand Jury Prize" in the World Cinema/Dramatic categories at the 2007 Sundance Film Festival
