= A Concise Chinese-English Dictionary for Lovers =

2007 novel by Xiaolu Guo

- Cover (publ. Knopf Doubleday Publishing Group)
- Author: Xiaolu Guo
- Language: English
- Publisher: Doubleday/Talese
- Publication date: February 2007
- Publication place: United Kingdom
- Pages: 304
- ISBN: 978-0-385-52029-4

A Concise Chinese-English Dictionary for Lovers is a novel by Chinese-born British writer Xiaolu Guo, published in 2007 by Doubleday. Guo's first novel written in English, it was shortlisted for the 2007 Women's Prize for Fiction.

== Summary ==
A young Chinese woman, Zhuang, arrives in London on a student visa and soon falls in love with an English sculptor. Her budding relationship is complicated by her lack of English language skills. The early chapters of the book are narrated in broken English, and gradually the language improves. The novel asks deep questions about the real differences between two individuals beyond cultures and languages.

== Reception ==
A Concise Chinese-English Dictionary for Lovers received mixed reviews.

CBC Books called it "a novel of language and love" and noted that "with sparkling wit, Xiaolu Guo has created an utterly original novel about identity and the cultural divide".

English critic Boyd Tonkin from The Independent hailed it as '"An auspicious English language debut."

Writing in The Guardian, Carole Cadwalladr criticised the structure of the book, finding the broken English narration unconvincing. However, Cadwalladr praised some elements of the book as funny and appealing. In another The Guardian review, Ursula K. Le Guin spoke favourably of Guo's writing style and characters, calling the broken English narrative style "ingenious and risky".

Publishers Weekly said Zhuang had a "unique, evolving voice".

Kirkus Reviews argued that the novel became engaging after "the early chapters' self-conscious winsomeness".

== Awards ==
A Concise Chinese-English Dictionary for Lovers was shortlisted for the Women's Prize for Fiction in 2007.
