= Gay Bar: Why We Went Out =

Book by Jeremy Atherton Lin

- First edition
- Author: Jeremy Atherton Lin
- Genre: Creative Nonfiction
- Publication date: 2021

Gay Bar: Why We Went Out is a 2021 creative nonfiction book by essayist Jeremy Atherton Lin published by Little, Brown in North America and Granta in the United Kingdom. It is a response to LGBT venue closures written in the idiom of cultural memoir.

Gay Bar was listed among the Times Critics' Top Books of the Year in The New York Times. It received the National Book Critics Circle Award for Autobiography. It was shortlisted for the Randy Shilts Award. In French translation, it won the 2024 Prix du Roman Gay Discovery.

Atherton Lin created a show for NTS Radio based on the book.
