= Once Upon a Time in the East (book) =

Memoir by Xiaolu Guo

- Author: Xiaolu Guo
- Language: English
- Media type: Print (hardcover, paperback)
- ISBN: 9781473524309

First edition (publ. Chatto & Windus)

Once Upon a Time in the East is a memoir by Chinese-born British Xiaolu Guo. The book is titled Nine Continents: A Memoir In and Out of China in the United States.

== Summary ==
Guo's memoir begins with her as a newborn, when she was given to another couple by her parents. The couple raised Guo in a mountain village, where she remained until she was two years old, when the couple sent Guo back to her grandparents. Guo lived with her grandparents in the fishing village Shitang until she was seven. As a child, Guo was in constant hunger. She later met her birth parents and lived at a communist compound. The memoir documents her time in Beijing, and in London after moving there in 2002.

== Background ==
Guo decided to write the book because her friends said that her previously published writings about her childhood "were amazing". Her novel Village of Stone was partially based on her life. Guo thought that it would be hard to write the book, but she said that "it was the quickest book" that she has written. It was most difficult for Guo to write about her early life.

The book is titled Nine Continents: A Memoir In and Out of China in the United States.

== Reception ==
A review in The Scotsman compared this book with Dear Friend, From My Life I Write To You In Your Life by Yiyun Li, stating, "But the differences are more deep-structured than superficial, in that Guo and Li represent two sides of an almost perpetual literary dichotomy; the Romantic and the Classical. Although Li writes movingly and affectingly about her own circumstances – the essays were born out of two spells in hospital for depression and speak openly about suicide – she writes towards a kind of selflessness".

Kirkus Reviews praised the book: 'A rich and insightful coming-of-age story of not only a woman, but an artist and the country in which she was born.'

Awards for Once Upon a Time in the East
Year	Award	Result	Ref.
2017	Costa Book Award for Biography	Shortlist	
2017	National Book Critics Circle Award for Autobiography	Winner	
2018	Royal Society of Literature Ondaatje Prize	Shortlist	
2018	Rathbones Folio Prize	Shortlist	
