= Jeremy Atherton Lin =

American author

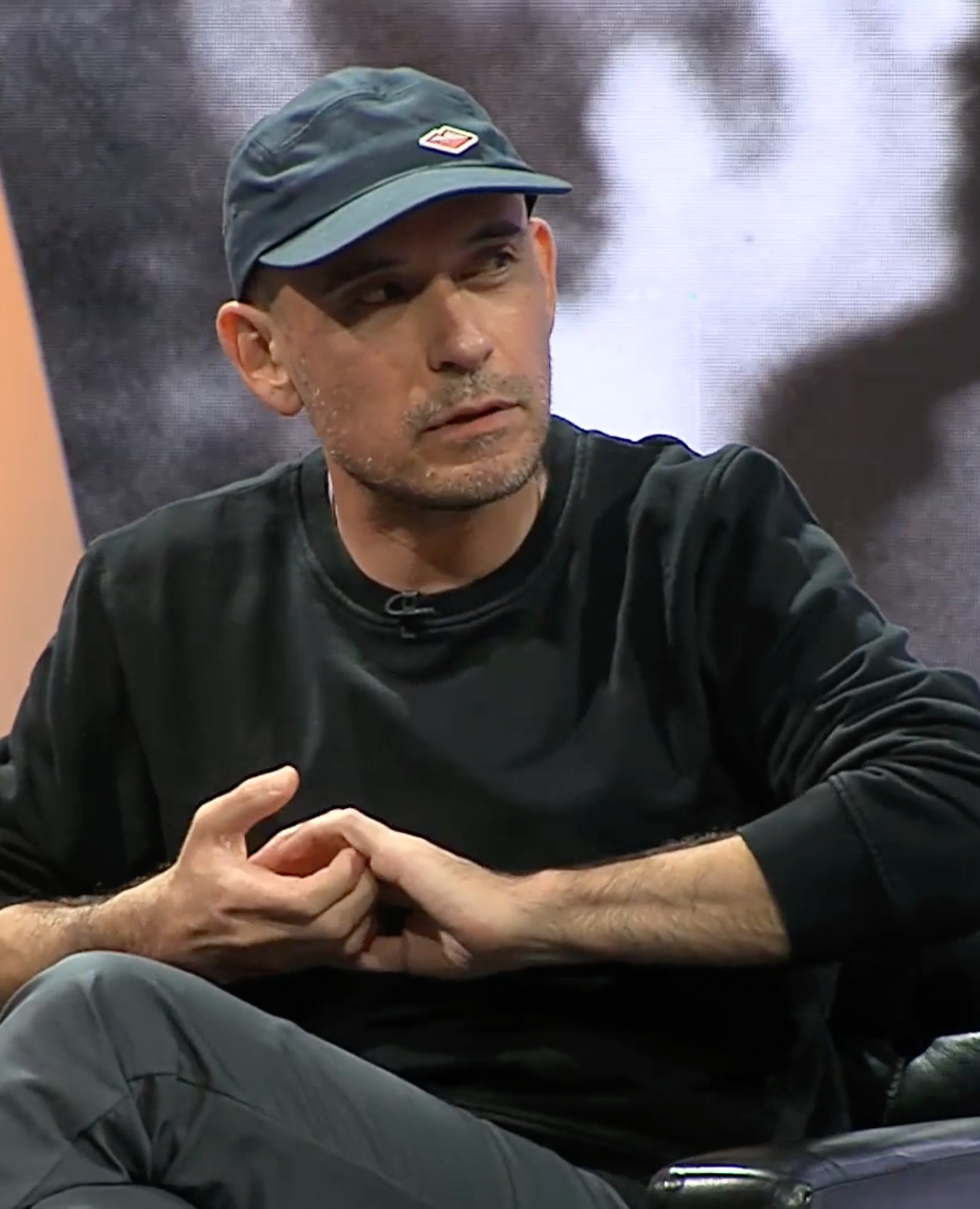
- Atherton Lin at the Edinburgh International Book Festival 2021
- Education: UCLA; Royal College of Art
- Occupations: Author and essayist
- Writing career
- Genres: Non-fiction; memoir
- Notable works: Gay Bar, Deep House
- Notable awards: National Book Critics Circle Award for Autobiography
- Website: jeremyathertonlin.com

Jeremy Atherton Lin (born 1974) is an American essayist known for writing about gay culture and alienation. He is the author of the cultural memoirs Gay Bar and Deep House.

== Life and work ==
Atherton Lin was raised in Saratoga, California. He attended Lynbrook High School and graduated from the theater department at UCLA. He served as the inaugural editorial director of Surface Magazine, which was then based in San Francisco. After moving to the UK, he obtained the MA in writing at the Royal College of Art in London.

Atherton Lin's debut book Gay Bar: Why We Went Out (2021) won the National Book Critics Circle Award for Autobiography. It was included in The New York Times Critics' Top Books of 2021.

In Deep House (2025), Atherton Lin recounts his transnational relationship before the legalization of same-sex marriage or immigration concessions for binational gay couples. The book was listed among the Publishers Weekly Top 10 Best Books of 2025 and the USA Today Best-selling Booklist. It was the subject of an essay in The New Yorker, in which culture critic Lauren Michele Jackson dubbed Atherton Lin "a sensual historian."

Atherton Lin's essay 'The Wrong Daddy' was a finalist for a National Magazine Award, the first-ever such nomination for a piece published by The Yale Review in its two-centuries-plus history. Atherton Lin profiled non-binary celebrities Sam Smith, Bimini Bon-Boulash and Mae Martin for British editions of GQ, traditionally a men's magazine. He has published essays in The Paris Review and the Times Literary Supplement, and reviewed new fiction for The Guardian and The Washington Post. He wrote the cover feature on Wolfgang Tillmans for the September 2022 issue of Frieze in advance of the artist's retrospective at the Museum of Modern Art.

In 2022, Atherton Lin was featured in artist Every Ocean Hughes's durational performance at the Moderna Museet. His sound essays have been broadcast by NTS Radio. His music playlists have been written about in publications including The New Yorker and BuzzFeed.

Atherton Lin lives in St Leonards-on-Sea, England with his husband.

== Bibliography ==
- Deep House: The Gayest Love Story Ever Told, Little, Brown, 2025, ISBN 978-0316545792
- Deep House: The Gayest Love Story Ever Told, Allen Lane/Penguin, 2025, ISBN 978-0241629789
- Gay Bar: Why We Went Out, Little, Brown, 2021, ISBN 9780316458757
- Gay Bar: Why We Went Out, Granta, 2021, ISBN 9781783785834
- Gay Bar: Perché Uscivamo La Notte, Minimum Fax, 2023, ISBN 9788833894614
- Gay Bar: Pourquoi nous sortions le soir, Tusitala Editions, 2024, ISBN 9791092159349

=== Essays ===
- 'Death in the Age of Instagram,' 2018, Noon
- 'A Good Old-Fashioned Hit of Poppers,' 2020, The Times Literary Supplement
- 'The Wrong Daddy,' 2021, The Yale Review, included in The Best American Magazine Writing 2022, Columbia University Press, 2022, ISBN 9780231208901
- 'A Brief Literary History of Gay and Lesbian Bars,' 2021, Literary Hub
- 'Their Tenderest Yearnings of Affection,' 2021, Fantastic Man
- 'Fun,' included in Sluts (Ed. Michelle Tea), Dopamine, 2024, ISBN 9781635902129
- 'Snob Queer,' included in A Great Gay Book (Ed. Ryan Fitzgibbon), Abrams Books, 2024, ISBN 9781419766787
- 'Renting,' included in Little Joe: a book about queers and cinema, mostly, 2024, ISBN 978-1739606763
