= Super Sad True Love Story =

2010 novel by Gary Shteyngart

Super Sad True Love Story: A Novel
- First edition cover
- Author: Gary Shteyngart
- Cover artist: Rodrigo Corral
- Language: English
- Genre: Novel
- Publisher: Random House
- Publication date: July 27, 2010
- Publication place: United States
- ISBN: 978-1-4000-6640-7

Super Sad True Love Story is the third novel by American writer Gary Shteyngart, and was published in 2010. The novel takes place in a near-future dystopian New York where life is dominated by media and retail.

== Plot summary ==
The son of a Russian immigrant, protagonist Leonard (Lenny) Abramov, a middle-aged, middle class, otherwise unremarkable man whose mentality is still in the past century, falls madly in love with Eunice Park, a young Korean-American from New Jersey struggling with materialism and the pressures of her traditional Korean family. The chapters alternate between profuse diary entries from the old-fashioned Lenny and Eunice's biting e-mail correspondence on her "GlobalTeens" account.

In the background of what appears to be a love story that oscillates between superficiality and despair, a grim political situation unravels. America is on the brink of economic collapse, threatened by its Chinese creditors. In the twilight nation, the only three industries left are Media, Credit, and Retail. In the meantime, the totalitarian Bipartisan Party government's main mission is to encourage and promote consumerism while eliminating political dissidents, under US President Cortez. Abramov is a member of the Creative Class, who sells long-term life extension to high net worth individuals in Italy. Italy is the only country in Europe that still has any meaningful dealings with the US. The United States invaded Venezuela at some point. In the story, to describe the change in relative positions, six million Chinese Yuan is equal to US$50 million. The current USA is fixed in a cult of youth based on the oversaturated "GlobalTeens" social media site, which has the phrase "Less words = more fun!!!" The US is called an "unstable, barely governable country presenting grave risk to the international system of corporate governance and exchange mechanisms" by a member of the Chinese Central Bank.

Abramov, acting as the POV character, explains the future of the US in the wake of the sudden collapse of the Bipartisan government, in a political event called “The Rupture."

== Critical reception ==
The novel won the Salon Book Award (Fiction, 2010) and the Bollinger Everyman Wodehouse Prize (2011). It was a New York Times Notable Book of the Year (Fiction & Poetry, 2010), New York Times bestseller (Fiction, 2010), and Amazon's Best Books of the Month in August 2010. It was named one of the best books of the year by numerous publications, including The Washington Post, The Boston Globe, San Francisco Chronicle, O: The Oprah Magazine, Maureen Corrigan of NPR, and Slate. In 2016, the literary critic Raymond Malewitz published an article on "digital posthumanism" in the novel in the journal Arizona Quarterly. In a more recent article in Revista Canaria de Estudios Ingleses, Martín Urdiales-Shaw has approached this novel as foregrounding various interrelated "modes of waste", operating across sociopolitical, cultural, ethical and biological paradigms.

== TV adaptation ==
In 2016, Ben Stiller and Media Rights Capital announced plans for a TV series for Showtime based on Super Sad True Love Story but no further developments had occurred as of November 2021.
