= Ada Milea =

Romanian singer and actress

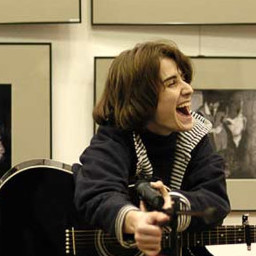
- Ada Milea
- Born: August 5, 1975 (age 51); Târgu Mureș
- Known for: singing and composing

Ada Milea (born August 5, 1975) is a Romanian singer and actress. Milea has written several film scores. She has supported a community under threat from a mining company by volunteering her talents for a festival.

== Life ==
Milea was born in Târgu Mureș. She attended the University of Arts of Târgu Mureș. She worked at the National Theatre of Targu Mures, in 1997. She left to try her own career in 1999. She recorded the album Absurdistan in 2002.

In 2005 she was one of the performers volunteering their time for FanFest, a concert in support of Roșia Montană, a community under threat from mining.

She wrote the music for the award-winning film Elevator, which was released in 2008. It was an independent film with two actors which was directed by George Dorobanțu and written by Gabriel Pintilei based on his own play.

Milea and Alexander Balanescu released the CD The Island, featuring the Balanescu Quartet, in 2011.

Milea headlined at London's Europalia Romania festival. She was joined by the Balanescu Quartet to perform a work by Gellu Naum based on the story of Robinson Crusoe on the 300th anniversary of its publication. In 2022 she opened the 26th Arad International Classical Theater Festival with comedic puns.
