= Little Seed =

2024 memoir by Wei Tchou

- Author: Wei Tchou
- Publisher: Deep Vellum
- Publication date: May 14, 2024
- Pages: 150
- ISBN: 978-1646053360

Little Seed is a 2024 memoir by Wei Tchou, published by Deep Vellum.

== Contents and background ==
Tchou grew up in a Chinese American family to Shanghainese parents, with an older brother. The book follows Tchou's own experiences to her Chinese American family alongside a parallel investigation into botany, specifically ferns. It addresses a psychotic break her older brother suffered, as well as some traumatic incidents with an instructor at the University of North Carolina where Tchou attended her undergraduate education, among other moments in Tchou's life.

== Critical reception ==
Christoph Irmscher, writing for Nashville Scene, saw the book as Tchou's "attempt at self-translation" with regard to her Chinese American heritage and her Shanghainese culture. Irmscher also observed the role of ferns in the book: "Ferns, for the author, represent an alternate realm of overwhelming beauty, exuberant diversity and infinite magic. A world fundamentally different, then, from the one in which young Wei Tchou, who calls herself 'Little Seed' throughout most of the book, has to learn how to function, where her best chance of survival is to make herself look, as much as she can, like everyone else."

Madison Ford, writing for The Brooklyn Rail, stated: "Wei Tchou vacillates between the pinnules and petioles of ferns and the bounds and betrayals of humans as she unpacks the defining moments of her upbringing and her present obsessions. As Tchou attempts to make sense of her life, she looks to the patterns of life within the living." Ford lauded the beauty in Tchou's experimentation with narrative resulting from her integration of ferns to the book's more memoirist tradition.

Kirkus Reviews felt the best parts of the books involved Tchou's close observation of her "family dynamics ... achingly and beautifully, to contemplate who she is and who she wants to be", specifically highlighting a moment when Tchou's older brother suffered a psychotic break at her office in Times Square. The reviewer, however, found the book sometimes "uneven".

The New Yorker, in a briefly noted review, observed the book's interplay between personal history and natural history "in which chapters alternate between botanical esoterica and descriptions of Tchou’s personal life" and pointed out "graceful moments of glancing association" in the book's parallel narratives.
