= George Dorobanțu =

George Dorobanţu
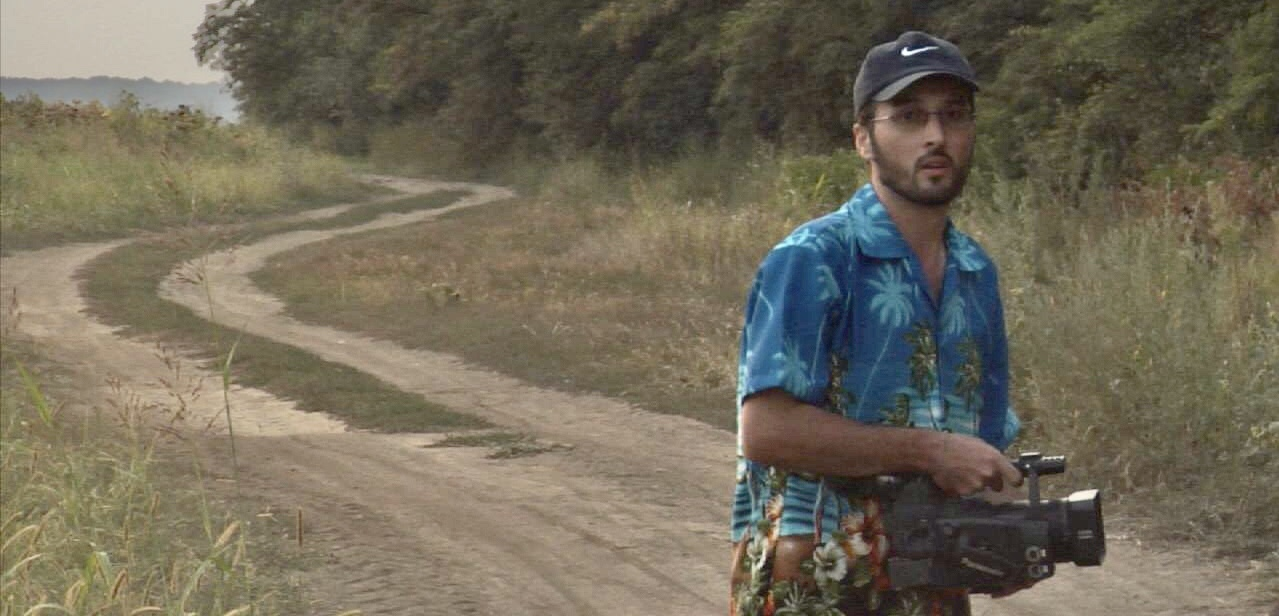
- Born: October 14, 1974 (age 50); Constanţa, Romania
- Occupation(s): Film director, producer, screenwriter, editor, cinematographer
- Website: http://www.KeepMovieng.com

George Dorobanţu (born October 14, 1974) is a Romanian filmmaker. He made his directorial debut with Elevator (2008), an indie production adapting Gabriel Pintilei's stage play of the same title. Aside from being a director, he is also working for the advertising industry.

== Films ==
Dorobanţu's first Elevator has been notable due to the claim that it was made with a fund of 300 euro. Despite the shoestring budget, it earned several rewards both in Romania and overseas. Elevator was followed by Bucharestless, which was a cinéma verité or a documentary about the Romanian capital. The 2011 film had an outside-the-box cinematic perspective, with a sequential narrative approach, and no dialogues. It depicted the soul of the city, which was referred to in the past as "Little Paris". The post-apocalyptic film called Omega Rose followed Bucharestless, although it was only completed in 2018. This movie was already in post-production stage in 2012. During the same year, Suspense 101 was also completed and it earned immense interest. The 17-minute short film, which told the story of a hacker, who invented an odd prototype, was selected as one of the finalists of the annual ScripTeast, which were presented at the 2012 Cannes Film Festival.
