= Wei Tchou =

Writer and editor

Wei Tchou is a writer and editor based in New York City. She is the author of the memoir, Little Seed, which was published by Deep Vellum, and is a co-founder of Reported Media, a content studio.

== Early life and education ==
Tchou grew up in a Chinese American household in Nashville, Tennessee; her parents are Shanghainese immigrants. She attended the University of North Carolina and, afterward, attended the MFA program at Hunter College.

== Career ==
From 2016 to 2017, Tchou was a regular columnist for The Paris Review. Her pieces have additionally appeared in The New York Times, The New Yorker, and others. Tchou was also a 2016 Margins Fellow at the Asian American Writers' Workshop.

In 2020, Tchou and Bess Adler co-founded Reported Media, a content studio that works with several clients to produce documentaries and other storytelling works; past clients include Feeding America and Clue. In the winter of that year, Tchou attended a MacDowell Residency where she worked on her memoir.

In 2024, Tchou's memoir, Little Seed, was published by Deep Vellum. Nashville Scene called it an "extraordinary first book." The New Yorker described it as "A family story and a natural history of the fern". Similarly, Kirkus Reviews said it was "An intriguing, occasionally uneven family memoir grafted to a cultural history of ferns."
