= New York Society Library =

Library in New York City (founded 1754)

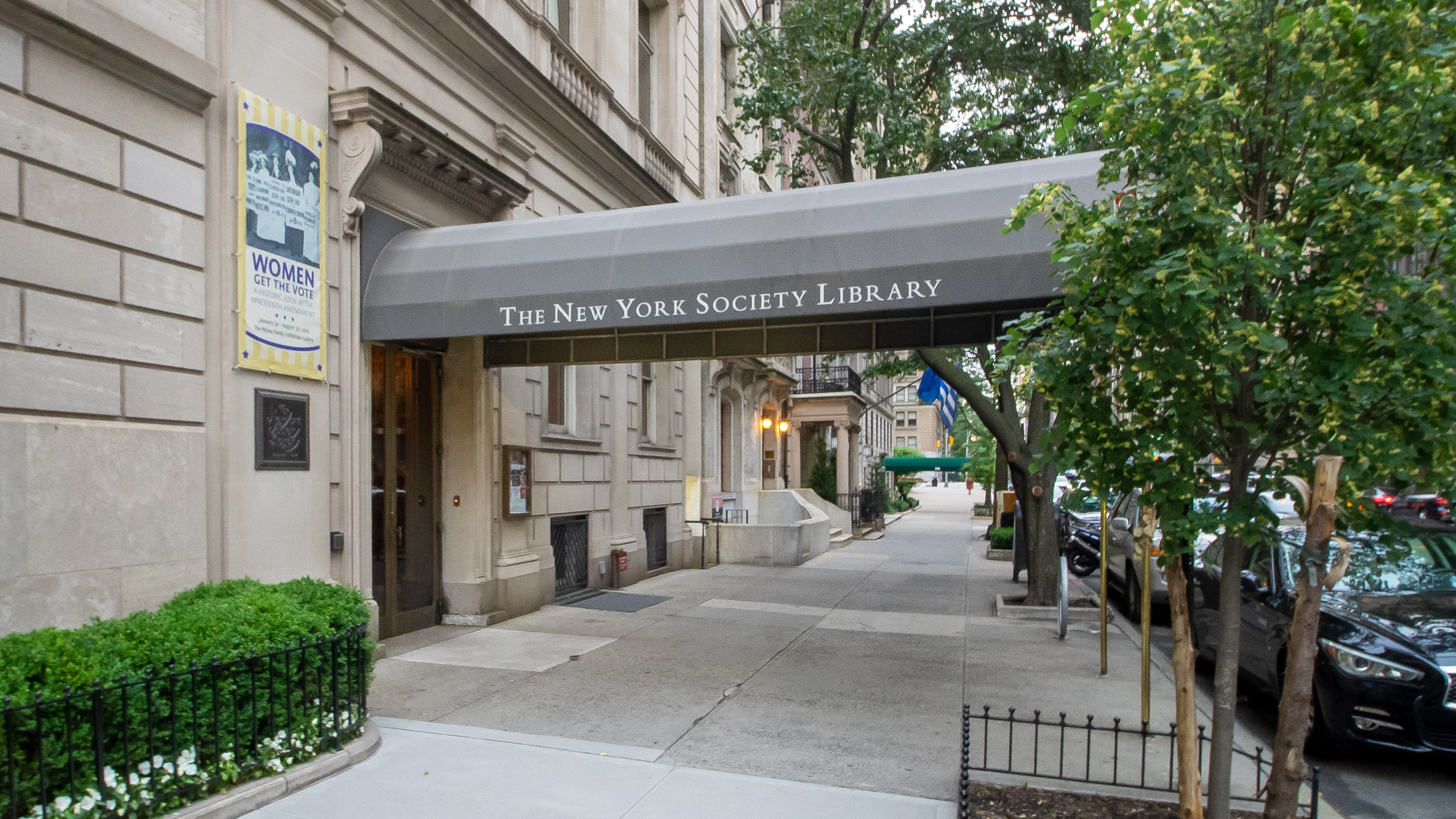
- The New York Society Library building at 53 East 79th Street in Manhattan
- 40°46′34.5″N 73°57′41.4″W
- Location: Upper East Side, Manhattan, New York, NY, United States
- Type: Subscription library
- Established: 1754; 272 years ago

Collection
- Items collected: Books, periodicals, audio recordings
- Size: 300,000

Access and use
- Circulation: approx. 68,131 (2016)
- Members: 2,937 (2018 Society Library Index)

Other information
- Budget: $3 million
- Director: Carolyn Waters
- Employees: 18 full-time, 10 part-time
- Website: www.nysoclib.org

The New York Society Library (NYSL) is the oldest cultural institution in New York City. It was founded in 1754 by the New York Society as a subscription library. During the time when New York was the capital of the United States, it was the de facto Library of Congress. Until the establishment of the New York Public Library in 1895, it functioned as the city's library as well. It has been patronized by a wide variety of literary and political figures, from George Washington to Wendy Wasserstein. Its special collections include books from the libraries of John Winthrop and Lorenzo Da Ponte.

Since 1937, the library has been housed in the former John S. Rogers Mansion at 53 East 79th Street on Manhattan's Upper East Side, the fifth location in its history. The stone Renaissance Revival building was one of the earliest recognized as a New York City landmark in 1967, and it was further listed on the National Register of Historic Places (as the John S. Rogers House) in 1983 in recognition of both its architecture and the library's historic role in the city.

The library's collection of 300,000 volumes includes audio recordings and periodicals, as well as books on a broad range of subjects. It is open for browsing and research by the general public; only members may borrow books or use the upper floors. The library is a nonprofit organization supported primarily by its membership fees and endowment.

== History ==
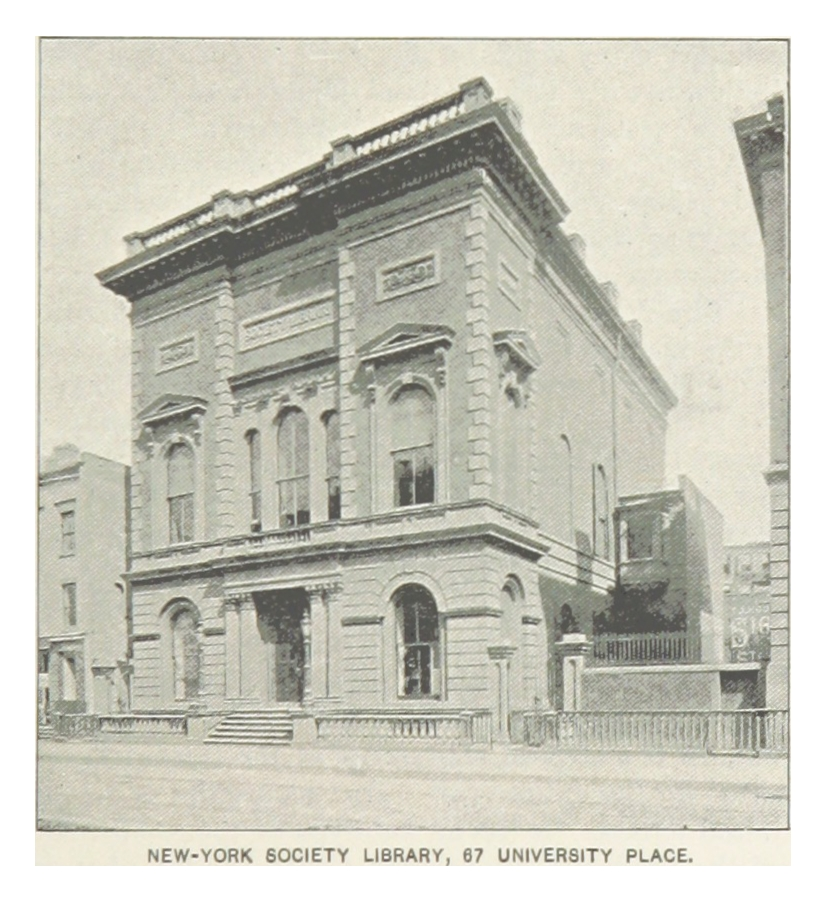
In 1856, the New York Society Library moved into this location at 109 University Place, where it remained until moving to 53 East 79th Street in 1937.

In 1754, six residents of New York City, which was then located primarily on what is now Lower Manhattan, formed the New York Society. At the time, the city did not have a library, and the New York Society believed that such an institution would be useful to the community. They convinced Colonial Governor James DeLancey to let them use a room in the original City Hall, at Wall and Broad streets, for that purpose. In 1772, the Society received a charter from King George III.

During the Revolutionary War, New York was occupied by the British Army. The library's small collection suffered from extensive looting. Soldiers tore book paper up to make wadding for their muskets, or sold the books for rum. After independence was achieved in 1783, the New York State Legislature recognized the library's charter. During that time, Congress was meeting in the building in New York City.

The NYSL effectively served as the first Library of Congress for two years, and its records show borrowings by George Washington, John Adams, and Alexander Hamilton, among other early American notables from that time. Washington is believed to have failed to return two books due in 1789; the library has announced that it plans to waive the $300,000 fine but is still seeking the return of the books.

After Congress moved out, the library built its collection back up again to 5,000 volumes and moved to its own building on Nassau Street. It continued to grow in membership and volumes, remaining there through 1840, when it joined the New York Atheneum at Leonard Street and Broadway. Among the visitors recorded at that location were Henry David Thoreau and John James Audubon. Edgar Allan Poe and Ralph Waldo Emerson lectured there.

Like other subscription libraries at the time, members paid a membership fee to access the collection. A board of trustees was elected which hired the librarians, chose materials for the collection and drafted and enforced regulations for library use. The nature of the collection represented the ideals of the library and contained works of a great variety. Although Christian theological texts were included, so was the Koran and books on Catholic saints and popes. There was a variety of natural philosophy texts alongside works by Shakespeare. Resources were also available for a variety of vocational purposes, including manuals for merchants and farmers.

By 1856, the collection had reached 35,000 and it was once again time for the library to move. A larger building for its exclusive use was erected at 109 University Place, (Note: Originally 67 University Place, the address became 109 University Place owing to a street renumbering sometime between 1895 and 1904. (Compare Plate 57 (right half) from: Insurance Maps of the City of New York Surveyed and Published by Sanborn–Perris Map Co., Limited. Volume 3. (New York: 1895) with Plate 25 from: Insurance Maps of the City of New York Borough of Manhattan. Volume Three. (New York: Sanborn Map Company, 1904)) reflecting the city's continuing northerly expansion. Herman Melville and Willa Cather were among the visitors to that location. It had a double-height central reading room and shelf space for 100,000 books. This building would serve the NYSL for 81 years.

In 1937, with the collection having grown to 150,000 volumes, the library moved to its present location at 53 East 79th Street, on the Upper East Side between Madison and Park avenues. It was thanks to a generous donation from the Goodhue family that enabled the purchase of the building, which was a mansion built just 20 years earlier. Notable patrons at the present location have ranged from W. H. Auden and Lillian Hellman in the early years to David Halberstam and Wendy Wasserstein more recently.

== Building ==
- John S. Rogers House
- U.S. National Register of Historic Places
- New York State Register of Historic Places
- New York City Landmark
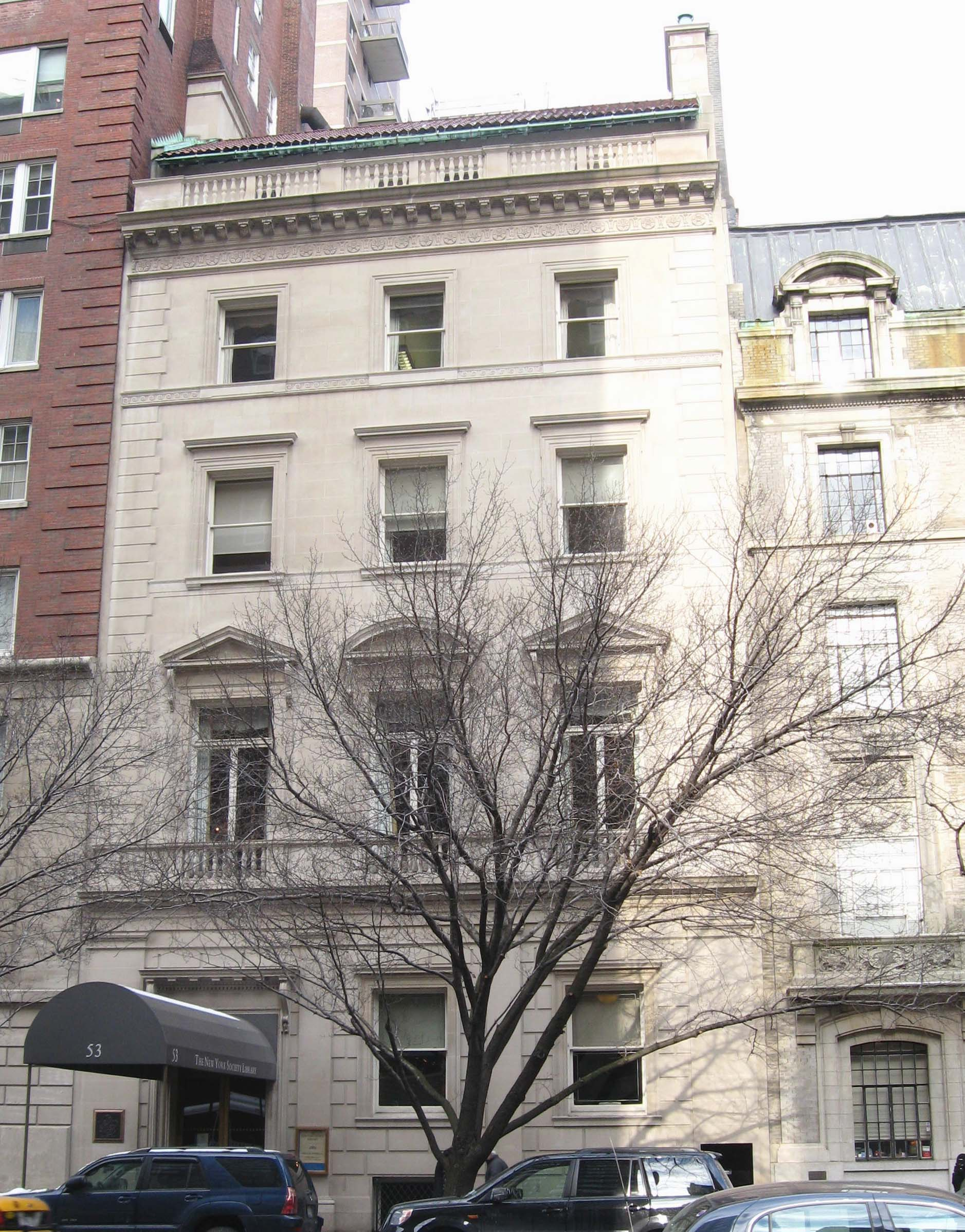
- 53 East 79th Street

- Location within Manhattan Location within New York City Location within New York
- Location: 53 E. 79th St., Manhattan, New York
- Coordinates: 40°46′34″N 73°57′43″W
- Area: less than one acre
- Built: 1917
- Architect: Trowbridge & Livingston
- Architectural style: Late 19th And 20th Century Revivals, neo-Italian Renaissance
- NRHP reference No.: 83001744
- NYSRHP No.: 06101.000090
- NYCL No.: 0427

Significant dates
- Added to NRHP: June 30, 1983
- Designated NYSRHP: May 3, 1980
- Designated NYCL: February 15, 1967

Trowbridge & Livingston designed the house at 53 East 79th Street for the John S. Rogers family in 1917, in the firm's later years. Most of their buildings in the city were commercial, such as the B. Altman and Company Building and the St. Regis Hotel on Fifth Avenue, and the east wing of the American Museum of Natural History. The John S. Rogers House is considered a prime example of their residential work.

The library is housed in a five-story, three-bay building faced in limestone. The main entrance at street level, behind a long awning, is flanked by two Doric pilasters supporting a horizontal lintel, set in rusticated stone. Above that story is a full-width balustrade.

On the upper stories the stone is laid in an ashlar pattern with quoins at the corners. The second story windows are double glass doors topped with carved bracketed pediments (rounded in the center). Belt courses at sill level divide the stories. Above the fifth story the roofline is marked by a frieze and cornice topped by another balustrade. Behind it is a small terrace sheltered by a wide overhang. An end chimney rises from the gabled tile roof.

The interior was extensively modified for the library in 1937. Much of this effort was focused on the rear; when it was completed, 39 rooms had been combined into 24. Original treatments remain, such as the coffered ceilings, stone walls and arched entryways on the first and second floors. The wood paneling and mantels in the card catalog room, second floor lounge and director's office is also original. Architectural historian Henry Hope Reed Jr. has described the main stairs as "the only [ones] in New York fit for a cardinal".

== Programs and collections ==
Members pay an annual fee of $350 for a family, $335 for a couple, $270 for an individual to gain borrowing privileges and access to the upper floors, with two closed stacks, a members' lounge and exhibit hall. There's also a $100 e-membership which includes access to the digital collection and 10 building visits a year. Those fees and the library's endowment support a staff of 18 full-time and 10 part-time employees and headed by director Carolyn Waters. The library acquires an average of 4,000 new volumes every year and subscribes to approximately 100 periodicals.

The collection also includes a children's library and 10,000 volumes in its special collections. Foremost among these latter are 290 books from the personal library kept by Puritan settler John Winthrop and his descendants. Another significant collection are the Italian-language books kept by Mozart's librettist Lorenzo Da Ponte, who spent his last years in New York. He started an Italian Library Society in 1827 under the New York Society's auspices, to supplement his courses at Columbia, the first college courses in that language in the United States. Those 600 volumes made up a large share of the library's 1838 catalog, and are today separately organized as the Da Ponte collection.

== Head librarians ==
Head librarians have included:

- 1755–56: John Morin Scott
- 1756–57: George Duncan Ludlow
- 1765–68: Thomas Jackson
- 1768–74: James Wilmot
- 1774–89: George Murray
- 1789–90: George Wright
- 1790–94: Isaac Leonard Kip
- 1794–97: John P. Pearss
- 1797–1824: John Forbes
- 1824–28: Burtis Skidmore
- 1828–55: Phillip Jones Forbes
- 1855–57: John MacMullen
- 1857–95: Wentworth Sanborn Bulter
- 1895–1936: Frank Barna Bigelow
- 1936–54: Edith Hall Crowell
- 1954–78: Sylvia Hilton
- 1978–2005: Mark Piel
- 2005–06: Charles Cronin
- 2006–15: Mark Bartlett
- 2015–present: Carolyn Waters

== See also ==
- List of museums and cultural institutions in New York City
- List of New York City Designated Landmarks in Manhattan from 14th to 59th Streets
- National Register of Historic Places listings in Manhattan from 14th to 59th Streets
