= Absurdistan (novel) =

2006 novel by Gary Shteyngart

- First edition
- Author: Gary Shteyngart
- Audio read by: Ali Ahn, Adam Grupper
- Cover artist: Simon M. Sullivan
- Language: English
- Genre: Comedy
- Publisher: Random House
- Publication date: 2 May 2006
- Publication place: United States of America
- Media type: Print
- Pages: 352 pp
- ISBN: 978-1-4000-6640-7
- OCLC: 786489768
- Dewey Decimal: 813'.6—dc22
- LC Class: PS3619.H79A63 2006

Absurdistan is a 2006 novel by Gary Shteyngart. It chronicles the adventures of Misha Vainberg, the 325-pound son of the 1,238th-richest man in Russia, as he struggles to return to his true love in the South Bronx.

== Plot ==
Misha is known as "Snack Daddy" from his days at Accidental College, a school in the Midwestern U.S. (The college resembles Oberlin College, which Shteyngart attended, while its name "Accidental" is a play on the name of Occidental College.) Misha is desperate to return to his true love, Rouenna, whom he met while she was working at a "titty bar". She now attends Hunter College, at Misha's expense.

After Misha's father kills a prominent Oklahoma businessman, the INS bars the entire Vainberg family from entry into the United States. This strands Misha in his native Saint Petersburg (which he nostalgically refers to as "St. Leninsburg").

Misha's father is killed by a fellow oligarch. Soon afterwards, Misha has the opportunity to buy a Belgian passport from a corrupt diplomat in the fictitious ex-Soviet republic of Absurdsvanϊ (also known as Absurdistan).

Absurdistan's reputation for oil riches has earned it the nickname "Norway of the Caspian." The country is divided between two major ethnic groups: the Sevo and Svanϊ. They hate each other due to their dispute over the proper direction in which the "footrest" of the Orthodox cross is to be tilted. Civil war erupts in Absurdistan, and for the sake of a new love he has found, Misha is forced to take sides in the conflict.

Appointed as Minister of Multiculturalism, Misha is asked to petition Israel for funds, but he finds that the Sevo leader is manipulating him—and that the Sevo leader has been in league with the Svanϊ leader all along.

== Reviews ==
Absurdistan debuted to mainly favorable reviews, including from Walter Kirn on the cover of the New York Times Book Review; the same paper's Sunday Book Review listed it as one of the 10 best books of 2006. It also made the Chicago Tribune's list of the best books of the year, Time's best books of the year, and was chosen as a book of the year by the Washington Post, the San Francisco Chronicle, and many other publications. Lev Grossman of Time called the book "a satire that is profoundly funny, genuinely moving and wholly lovable."

== See also ==
- Absurdistan, a placeholder name for former Soviet bloc nations which have become, in the eye of the speaker, absurd, e.g. Turkmenistan or Belarus.
