= Gary Shteyngart =

Russian-American writer (born 1972)

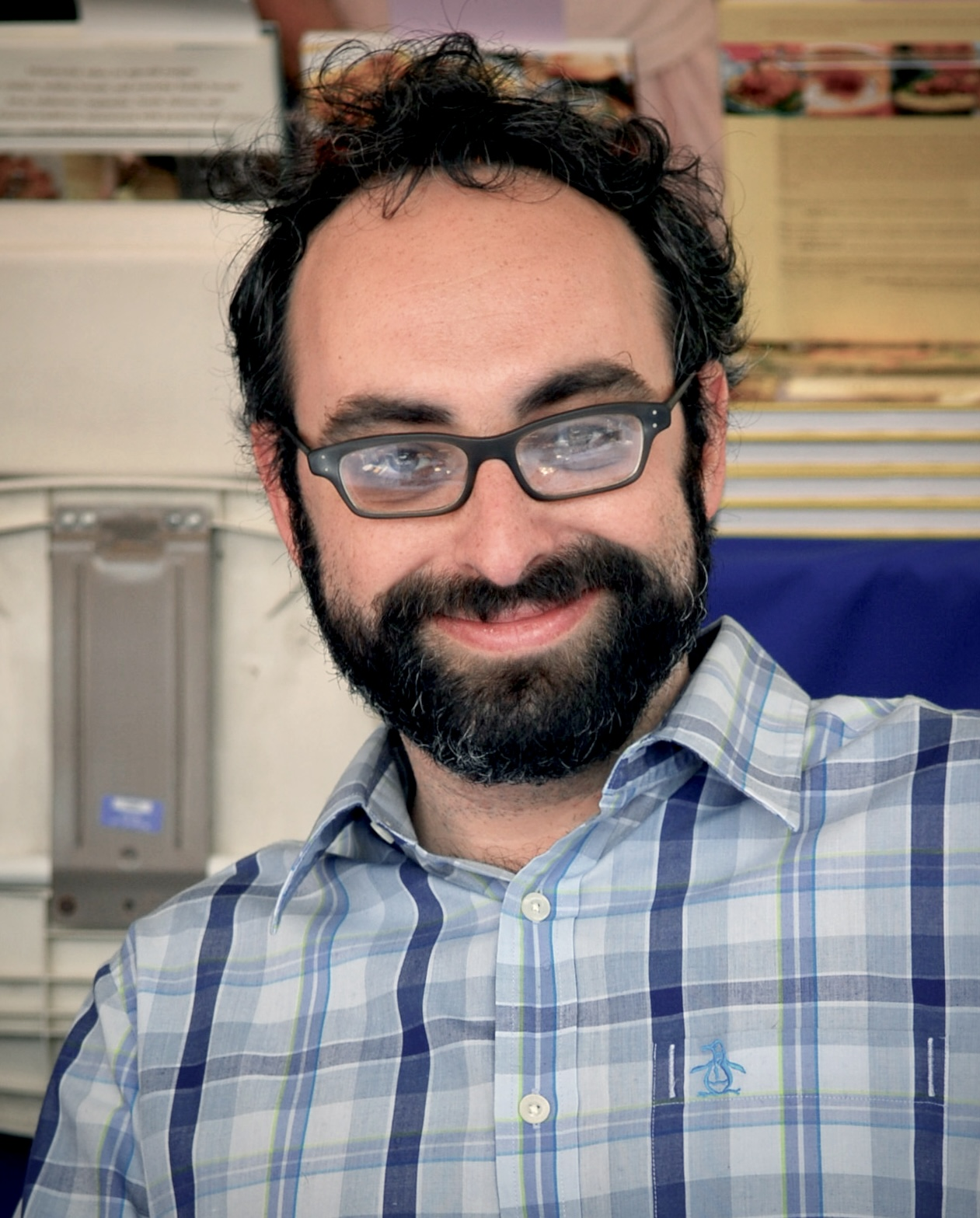
- Gary Shteyngart at the Los Angeles Times Festival of Books, 2008
- Born: Igor Semyonovich Shteyngart; July 5, 1972 (age 54); Leningrad, Russian SFSR, Soviet Union (present-day Saint Petersburg, Russia)
- Education: Oberlin College (BA); Hunter College (MFA)
- Occupation: Novelist
- Spouse: Esther Won
- Children: 1

Gary Shteyngart (English: /ˈʃtaɪnɡɑːrt/ SHTYNE-gart; born Igor Semyonovich Shteyngart on July 5, 1972) is a Soviet-born American writer. He is the author of six novels (including The Russian Debutante's Handbook, Absurdistan, Super Sad True Love Story, Vera, or Faith), and a memoir. Much of his work is satirical.

== Early life ==
Igor Semyonovich Shteyngart (Russian: Игорь Семёнович Штейнгарт) was born on July 5, 1972, in Leningrad—which he alternately calls "St. Leningrad" or "St. Leninsburg". He spent the first seven years of his childhood living in a square dominated by a huge statue of Vladimir Lenin. He comes from a Jewish family, with an ethnically Russian maternal grandparent, and describes his family as "typically Soviet". His father worked as an engineer in a LOMO camera factory; his mother was a pianist. When he was five, he wrote a 100-page comic novel.

Shteyngart immigrated to the United States in 1979 and was brought up in Queens, New York, with no television in the apartment in which he lived, where English was not the household language. He spoke with a Russian accent until he was around 14.

He is a graduate of Stuyvesant High School in New York City, and Oberlin College in Ohio, where he earned a degree in politics, in 1995, with a senior thesis on the former Soviet republics of Georgia, Moldova and Tajikistan.

== Career ==
After Oberlin, he worked a series of jobs as a writer for non-profit organizations in New York. Shteyngart worked as an ESL teacher at the NYANA refugee resettlement agency in the early 1990s.

Shteyngart took a trip to Prague in the early 1990s, and this experience helped spawn his first novel, The Russian Debutante's Handbook, set in the fictitious European city of Prava.

In 1999, as part of the application to Hunter College's MFA program he mailed a portion of his first novel to Chang-Rae Lee, the director of the creative writing program at Hunter College. Lee helped Shteyngart get his first book deal. Shteyngart earned an MFA in creative writing at Hunter College of the City University of New York. Shteyngart had a fellowship at the American Academy in Berlin, Germany, for Fall 2007. He has taught writing at Hunter College, and currently teaches writing at Columbia University.

== Awards ==
Shteyngart's work has received many awards. The Russian Debutante's Handbook won the Stephen Crane Award for First Fiction, the Book-of-the-Month Club First Fiction Award and the National Jewish Book Award for Fiction. It was named a New York Times Notable Book and one of the best debuts of the year by The Guardian.

In 2002, he was named one of the five best new writers by Shout NY Magazine. Absurdistan was chosen as one of the ten best books of the year by The New York Times Book Review and Time magazine, as well as a book of the year by the Washington Post, Chicago Tribune, San Francisco Chronicle and many other publications. In June 2010, Shteyngart was named as one of The New Yorker magazine's "20 under 40" luminary fiction writers. Super Sad True Love Story won the 2011 Bollinger Everyman Wodehouse Prize for comic literature. His memoir Little Failure was a finalist for the 2014 National Book Critics Circle Award (Autobiography).

== Work ==
Shteyngart's novels include The Russian Debutante's Handbook (2002), and Absurdistan (2006). Super Sad True Love Story (2010) was promoted by a film trailer with Paul Giamatti and James Franco. Thirty-five years after he emigrated to the U.S., in January, 2014, Random House published Little Failure: A Memoir, and promoted it by a film trailer with James Franco and Rashida Jones. His 2018 book Lake Success was promoted by a film trailer with Ben Stiller.

His fifth novel, Our Country Friends, was published by Random House in 2021. It is a story about friends who spend the pandemic together. His sixth novel, Vera, or Faith, published in 2025, is a story about a 10-year-old Korean American girl living in a near future dystopian U.S.

His other writing has appeared in The New Yorker, Slate, Granta, Travel and Leisure, The New York Times, and The Atlantic.

In 2026, he published an essay collection titled The Sensualist. It included pieces previously published in The New Yorker, The Atlantic, and elsewhere, on topics such as capybara and cruise ships.

== Blurbs ==
Shteyngart has also become known for his prolific blurbing, which has inspired a Tumblr website devoted to his Collected Blurbs, a live reading, and a fifteen-minute documentary narrated by Jonathan Ames.

== Bibliography ==
=== Novels ===
- Shteyngart, Gary (2002). The Russian Debutante's Handbook.
- — (2006). Absurdistan.
- — (2010). Super Sad True Love Story.
- — (2018). Lake Success.
- — (2021). Our Country Friends.
- — (2025). Vera, or Faith. Random House.

=== Memoirs ===
- Shteyngart, Gary (2014). Little Failure: A Memoir.

=== Short stories ===
- Shteyngart, Gary (August 26, 2002). "Shylock on the Neva". The New Yorker.
- — (March 19, 2006). "A Love Letter". The New Yorker.
- — (June 7, 2010). "Lenny Hearts Eunice". The New Yorker.
- — (June 18, 2018). "The Luck of Kokura". The New Yorker.

=== Essays and reporting ===
- Shteyngart, Gary (March 10, 2003). "Teen Spirit". Letter from Russia. The New Yorker.
- — (June 10–17, 2013). "From the Diaries of Pussy-Cake". Memoirs. The New Yorker.
- — (August 5, 2013). "O.K., Glass: Confessions of a Google Glass Explorer". Our Local Correspondents. The New Yorker.
- — (March 20, 2017). "Time Out: Confessions of a Watch Geek". Personal History. The New Yorker.
- — (October 4, 2021). "A Botched Circumcision and Its Aftermath". Personal History. The New Yorker.
- — (April 4, 2024). "Crying Myself to Sleep on the Biggest Cruise Ship Ever". The Atlantic.
- — (April 24, 2024). "A Martini Tour of New York City". Annals of Gastronomy. The New Yorker.
- — (August 13, 2024). "The Case for Robert F. KENNEDY Jr". The Atlantic.
- — (March 2025). "The Man in the Midnight-Blue Six-Ply Italian-Milled Wool Suit". The Atlantic.
- — The Sensualist. (2026). Random House.

== Personal life ==
Shteyngart is married to Esther Won, who is of Korean descent. They have a son, born October 2013. Shteyngart now lives in the Gramercy neighborhood of Manhattan. He spends six months out of the year at a house in northern Dutchess County, in the Hudson River Valley where he does nearly all of his writing.

== Interviews ==
- Law, Benjamin (Sep 2014). "10 things I believe (interview with Gary Shteyngart)". Smith Journal. 12: 22–24.
- Interview – Program for Jewish Civilization – Georgetown University
- Interview 'On Meat over Meat: Dinner with Gary Shteyngart', published in Gigantic
- Interview with Gary Shteyngart: On Travel Writing
- Rozalia Jovanovic. James Franco's Face: A Subjective Account of the New Yorker Festival October 26, 2009
- Interview with Gary Shteyngart: On Stuyvesant High School
- Radio interview with Gary Shteyngart on CBC Radio One's Writers and Company
- In Conversation: 1984 2.0: Gary Shteyngart with Alessandro Cassin, The Brooklyn Rail
- Interview with Gary Shteyngart about Absurdistan – BOOKSWEB TV (English and Italian)
- "Gary Shteyngart Becomes American" – Jewcy Magazine
- Interview with Gary Shteyngart – Modern Drunkard Magazine
- Interview at barnesandnoble.com
- Gary Shteyngart: Introducing a toilet Recorded at Louisiana Literature festival. Video by Louisiana Channel.
