= Little Failure =

2014 memoir by Gary Shteyngart

Little Failure: A Memoir
- Random House 2014 book jacket
- Author: Gary Shteyngart
- Audio read by: Jonathan Todd Ross
- Subject: Autobiographies, memoirs
- Genre: Narrative non-fiction
- Published: 2014
- Publisher: Random House
- Publication place: United States
- Media type: Print, eBook, Audio
- Pages: 349
- ISBN: 9780679643753 9780812982497
- OCLC: 841557764

Little Failure is a 2014 memoir by American writer Gary Shteyngart, which was published by Random House

== Brief book summary ==
Gary Shteyngart was a young asthmatic immigrant when he was brought to the United States from Russia by parents who knew little about American culture. To help him fit in, they changed his name from Igor to Gary, hoping it would spare him from some of the bullying he might face.

Overall, the story follows Shteyngart's life through different stages: from his childhood obsession with science fiction and computer games on his Commodore 64 to his teenage years at Stuyvesant High School, where he traded games for drugs and alcohol. He went to Oberlin College, hoping to finally find love, and he did, meeting his first serious girlfriend. While attempting to impress her, he crashed her car into a restaurant.

After college, he moved to New York City and fell for a woman named Pamela, who was in a relationship with someone else. Shteyngart wrote about his love for her as a form of self-abasement, a chance to beg for love he knew he wouldn't get. Pamela later went to jail for assaulting a man with a hammer.

Shteyngart realized he had a drinking problem as he approached his thirties. For this reason he started therapy, and then successfully sold his first novel.

== About the book ==
=== Panic attack ===
According to a review in The Guardian by J. Robert Lennon, the book is framed by a panic attack Shteyngart suffered in 1996 after seeing a picture of the Chesme Church in a New York City bookshop.

=== Book trailer ===
A comedic book trailer for the memoir featured Rashida Jones, James Franco, Jonathan Franzen, and Alex Karpovsky.
