= Lloyd and Rose Buck =

British bird handlers and trainers for film and television

Lloyd Buck and Rose Buck are British bird specialists, trainers and handlers who supply and fly trained birds for film, television, commercials and photography. Based in North Somerset, the couple hand-rear and imprint birds so that they will fly to camera, allowing close-range and in-flight sequences that are difficult or impossible to obtain from wild birds.

They have worked together for more than thirty-five years and their birds have appeared in over one hundred and fifty film and television productions since the early 1990s, including David Attenborough's The Life of Birds (1998), Poldark, Top Gear and the BBC's Springwatch strand. They trained the goshawks that play Mabel in the BAFTA-nominated 2025 feature film H Is for Hawk, opposite Claire Foy. The BBC has described them as sought out by television production companies "for years" because of their knowledge of training and their record in animal husbandry.

== Background ==
Lloyd Buck became interested in birds at the age of five and acquired his first bird of prey, a buzzard, as a teenager. He grew up in East Anglia, near Colchester, and moved to Bristol to hand-rear a brood of orphaned magpies for a producer at the BBC Natural History Unit, an assignment intended to last six months that became the start of his career.

Rose Buck met Lloyd after his move to Bristol. She had a long-standing interest in natural history and worked for more than twenty years as a nursery nurse in the special care baby unit of a maternity hospital, and afterwards in a special school, before joining the work full time. She took on the imprinting of the couple's waterfowl, living with newly hatched geese and swans around the clock so that they would accept her as their parent; Lloyd nicknamed her "Mother Goose". The couple work as a pair, and both are on location for the majority of the shoots they undertake.

== Work ==
The Bucks train birds to fly to, alongside and away from a camera on cue, to keep pace with tracking vehicles and microlights, and to carry lightweight cameras in flight. Species they have worked with include greylag geese, whooper swans, starlings, peregrine falcons, goshawks, sparrowhawks, golden eagles, barn owls and ravens. The birds live with the couple rather than in a collection, and all of them fly free and return by choice.

Their earliest listed credit is the BBC's Wildlife on One in 1992, and they have worked continuously in natural-history and drama production since. In 2014 BBC News reported on the couple training geese to fly in formation alongside a vehicle so that they could be filmed in flight.

For the 2012 BBC series Attenborough: 60 Years in the Wild, the Bucks supplied imprinted greylag geese to demonstrate Konrad Lorenz's concept of imprinting: the goslings were filmed treating Rose Buck as their mother, following her as she drove a quad bike and then flying in pursuit of a boat carrying Buck and David Attenborough.

For the 2016 BBC One series Life in the Air, the production team worked with the Bucks and a young male sparrowhawk named Zack to fly a cable-mounted camera alongside the bird at speed as it hunted through gardens and hedgerows, producing shots the programme's makers said would not otherwise have been achievable.

Individual birds of theirs have become known in their own right. Their goshawk Ellie was trained to carry a camera for the BBC series Animal Camera and later appeared in the Disneynature film Born in China; their starling Arnie, which mimics human speech, has appeared on the BBC's Autumnwatch; their raven Bran featured in an Autumnwatch problem-solving film; and their golden eagle Tilly has been flown carrying a camera mounted ahead of her in flight. In 2018 National Geographic photographed several of the Bucks' birds — Arnie, Bran and the goshawk Ellie — for a feature on avian intelligence.

=== H Is for Hawk ===
For the feature film H Is for Hawk (2026), directed by Philippa Lowthorpe and adapted from Helen Macdonald's memoir, the Bucks trained and supplied the goshawks that play Mabel opposite Claire Foy. Five birds were used for the role: two sisters from the same clutch, raised and trained by the couple well before filming, took the bulk of the work, with a third bird on loan from a falconry centre in Scotland used for the calmest scenes, a smaller male for high aerial shots, and a fifth, Lottie, for the hunting sequences.

Foy spent two weeks in intensive falconry training with the Bucks before filming began. Production was scheduled between October and January to avoid the birds' moulting season, the crew wore dark clothing to keep the birds calm, microphones were concealed because the birds disliked booms, and most of the crew worked out of sight while the birds were on set. Lloyd Buck described goshawks as the most difficult birds to film with, because they are rarely seen in the wild.

== Live show ==
The Bucks tour a stage show, Our Life with Birds (also billed as A Life with Birds), at UK theatres and arts venues, in which they discuss their work, show footage of sequences their birds have appeared in, and fly some of the birds in the auditorium.

== Selected filmography ==
The Bucks list approximately 155 productions; the following is a selection. A full list is maintained on their website.

=== Film ===
- H Is for Hawk (2026)
- McQueen (2018)
- Born in China (2016)
- The Little Stranger
- Sherlock Holmes (2009) — small-bird sequences
- Miss Pettigrew Lives for a Day (2008)
- Meerkat Manor: The Story Begins (2007)
- The Rocket Post (2002)

=== Television ===
Year	Title	Network
1992	Magpie in the Dock (Wildlife on One)	BBC
1995	Casualty	BBC
1998	Animal Minds	BBC
1998	The Life of Birds	BBC
1999	The Really Wild Show	BBC
2001	Ultimate Killers	BBC
2002	Weird Nature	BBC
2004	Britain Goes Wild	BBC
2004	Animal Camera	BBC
2005	Springwatch (and subsequently 2008–2016)	BBC
2007	Top Gear	BBC Two
2007	Will Work for Nuts (presenting and handling)	Channel 5
2008	Life	BBC
2008	Deadly 60	CBBC
2011	The Fades	BBC Three
2012	Attenborough: 60 Years in the Wild	BBC
2012	Richard Hammond's Miracles of Nature	BBC
2012	The Hollow Crown	BBC Two
2013	Wallander	BBC
2014	David Attenborough's Conquest of the Skies	Sky 1
2014	Inside the Animal Mind (Chris Packham)	BBC
2014	Hidden Kingdoms	BBC
2015	Poldark	BBC One
2016	Life in the Air	BBC One
2016	Owl Power / Super Powered Owls (Natural World)	BBC / PBS
2018	Requiem	BBC One
2018	Super Powered Eagles / Eagle Power (Natural World / Nova)	BBC / PBS
2020	McDonald & Dodds	ITV
2021	Chris Packham's Animal Einsteins	BBC Two
2021	Tiny World	Apple TV+
2023	Animal (series 2)	Netflix
2024	Supernatural	Disney+
2026	Sir David Attenborough 100th birthday card delivery short	BBC

=== Commercials and music videos ===
- Amazon worldwide Christmas advert (2021)
- RSPB television commercials (2014, 2015)
- Triumph Motorcycles online commercial
- Samsung Galaxy Tab S commercial
- Ashnikko — music video and stills
- Stornoway — "Man on Wire" and "Get Low"
- The Verve (2008)
- The Bravery (2006)
- New Order album imagery, photographed by Nick Knight (2002)

== Personal life ==
Lloyd and Rose Buck are married and live in North Somerset, where the birds are kept in a purpose-built bird garden near Bristol. Their granddaughter Maisy has assisted on shoots, including acclimatising the H Is for Hawk goshawks to camera crews before filming.
