= H is for Hawk =

2014 memoir by Helen Macdonald

- Author: Helen Macdonald
- Genre: Memoir
- Publisher: Jonathan Cape
- Publication date: 2014
- Pages: 300 pp.
- Awards: Samuel Johnson Prize, Costa Book of the Year
- ISBN: 0-224-09700-8
- OCLC: 898117636

H is for Hawk is a 2014 memoir by British author Helen Macdonald. It won the Samuel Johnson Prize and Costa Book of the Year award, among other honours.

The film of H Is for Hawk premiered in 2025.

== Content ==
H is for Hawk tells Macdonald's story of the year she spent training a Eurasian goshawk in the wake of her father's death. Her father, Alisdair Macdonald, was a respected photojournalist who died suddenly of a heart attack in 2007. Having previously been a falconer for many years, she purchased a young goshawk to help her through the grieving process.

== Reception ==
The book reached The Sunday Times best-seller list within two weeks of being published in July 2014.

In an interview with The Guardian, Macdonald said, "While the backbone of the book is a memoir about that year when I lost my father and trained a hawk, there are also other things tangled up in that story which are not memoir. There is the shadow biography of TH White, and a lot of nature-writing, too. I was trying to let these different genres speak to each other." White was the author of The Goshawk (1951), an account of his own attempt to train a goshawk.

Kevin Jackson, writing for Literary Review, drew further comparisons between Macdonald and White, in that she resembles him "in her gluttony for words both homely and exotic, their associations and histories." Macdonald's rich vocabulary is distinguished by her passion for precision, Jackson wrote: "Her eye is every bit as educated as her mind."

Judges of the Samuel Johnson Prize specifically highlighted that marriage of genres as one of the reasons for selecting H is for Hawk as the winner.

An extract of this book is part of the anthology for Edexcel's IGCSE English Language exam, in the new specification.

== In media ==
=== Television ===
In "H is for Hawk: A New Chapter", part of BBC's Natural World series in 2017, Macdonald trained a new goshawk chick.

=== Film adaptation ===
The film rights for the memoir were acquired by Lena Headey in April 2015, with intentions to star and produce in the adaption in conjunction with Plan B Entertainment. In February 2024, it was announced Claire Foy and Brendan Gleeson were cast in the film, along with Philippa Lowthorpe named as the director and Emma Donoghue as scriptwriter. Film4 Productions also co-produced and co-financed the adaptation with Plan B. Principal photography began in Cambridge in November 2024. The film premiered at the 52nd Telluride Film Festival.

== Awards and honours ==
- 2014 Samuel Johnson Prize, winner
- 2014 Costa Book of the Year, winner.
- 2014 Duff Cooper Prize, shortlist.
- 2015 Thwaites Wainwright Prize, longlist.
- 2015 Andrew Carnegie Medal for Excellence in Nonfiction, shortlist.
- 2016 Prix du Meilleur Livre Étranger, winner

== Translations ==
- Dutch: De H is van havik. Translated by Nico Groen and Joris Vermeulen. Amsterdam: De Bezige Bij. 10 September 2015. ISBN 9789023492412.
- Spanish: H de Halcón. Translated by Joan Eloi Roca. Barcelona: Ático de los Libros. 7 October 2015. ISBN 9788416222094.
- Italian: Io e Mabel. Ovvero l'arte della falconeria., lit. 'Me and Mabel. Or, the Art of Falconry'. Translated by Anna Rusconi. Turin: Einauldi. 26 January 2016. ISBN 9788806213381.
- Catalan: F de falcó. Translated by Ricard Vela. Barcelona: Àtic dels llibres. 16 March 2016. ISBN 9788416222087.
- Finnish: H niin kuin haukka. Translated by Irmeli Ruuska. Helsinki: Gummerus. 17 March 2016. ISBN 9789512402670.
- Polish: J jak jastrząb. Translated by Hanna Jankowska. Sękowa: Czarne. 11 May 2016. ISBN 9788380492974.
- Portuguese: F de falcão. Translated by Maria Carmelita Dias. Rio de Janeiro: Intrínseca. 8 June 2016. ISBN 9788580578140.
- Chinese: 鷹與心的追尋, romanized: Yīng yǔ xīn de zhuīxún, lit. 'Eagle and Heart's Quest'. Translated by Chen Jialin. Taipei: Xīn jīngdiǎn tú wén chuánbò yǒuxiàn gōngsī. 3 August 2016. ISBN 9789865824648.
- French: M pour Mabel, lit. 'M for Mabel'. Translated by Marie-Anne de Béru. Paris: Fleuve éditions. 25 August 2016. ISBN 9782823843903.
- Turkish: Atmacanın A’sı. Translated by Kıvanç Güney. Istanbul: Monokl. 26 October 2017. ISBN 9786055159641.
- German: H wie Habicht. Translated by Ulrike Kretschmer. Berlin: Ullstein. 17 November 2017. ISBN 9783548377353.
- Swedish: H som i hök. Translated by Meta Ottosson. Stockholm: Brombergs. 4 November 2022. ISBN 9789178092550.
- Lithuanian: V kaip vanagas. Translated by Kristina Aurylaitė. Vilnius: Baltos lankos. 20 September 2023. ISBN 9786094797804.

== See also ==
- Falconry training and technique
