= List of awards and nominations received by Claire Foy =

Claire Foy awards
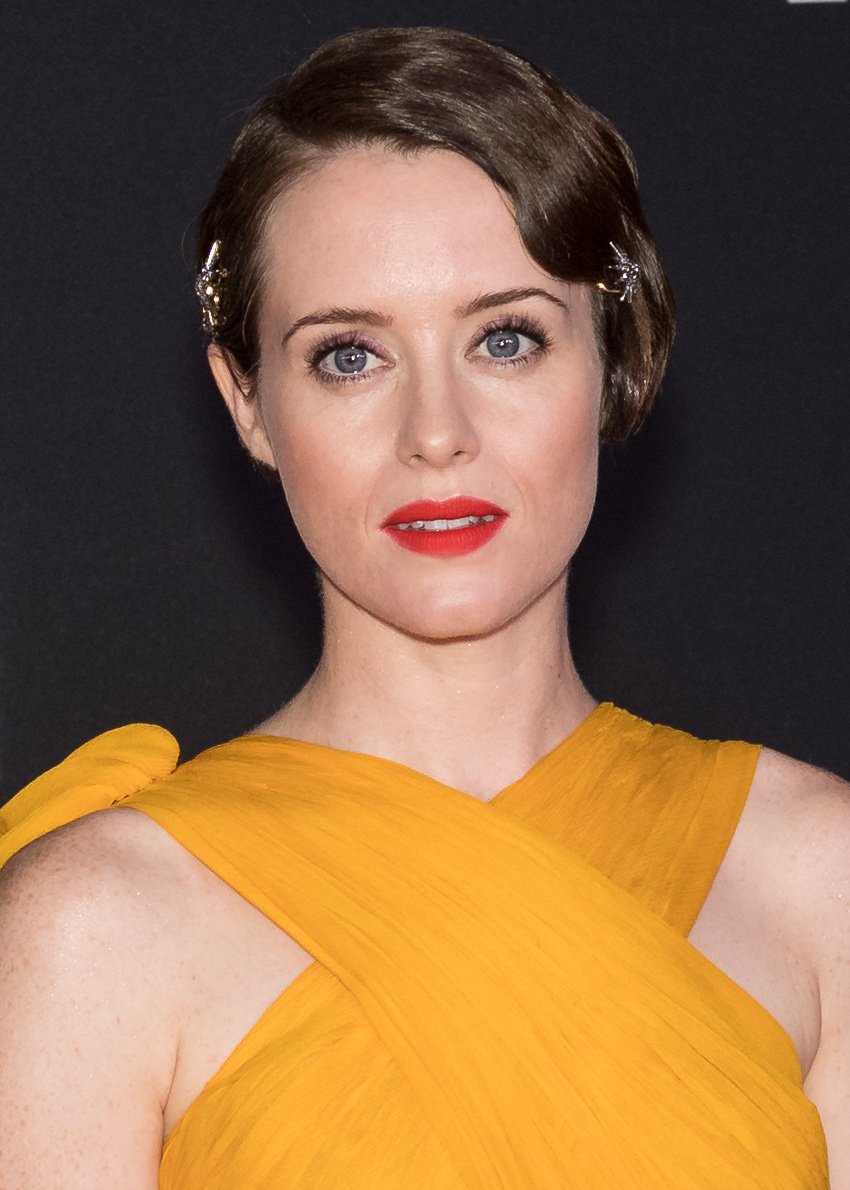
Foy at an event for First Man in 2018
Awards and nominations
| Award | Wins | Nominations |
Totals
| BAFTA Awards | 0 | 2 |
| BAFTA TV Awards | 0 | 3 |
| Critics' Choice Movie Awards | 1 | 3 |
| Critics' Choice Television Awards | 0 | 2 |
| Golden Globe Awards | 1 | 3 |
| Gotham Awards | 0 | 1 |
| Primetime Emmy Awards | 2 | 4 |
| Satellite Awards | 1 | 3 |
| Screen Actors Guild Awards | 2 | 5 |
| TCA Awards | 0 | 1 |
| Wins | 7 |
| Nominations | 41 |

British actress Claire Foy first received recognition for her role in the period drama miniseries Little Dorrit (2008). She received similar praise for her portrayal of the ill-fated queen Anne Boleyn in the period drama miniseries Wolf Hall (2015), for which she garnered a nomination for the BAFTA TV Award for Best Actress.

Foy gained worldwide recognition and praise for her portrayal of Queen Elizabeth II on the Netflix original drama series The Crown (2016–17), winning several popular industry awards: including a Golden Globe Award for Best Actress – Television Series Drama, two Screen Actors Guild Awards for Outstanding Performance by a Female Actor in a Drama Series, a Primetime Emmy Award for Outstanding Lead Actress in a Drama Series, and a Primetime Emmy Award for Outstanding Guest Actress in a Drama Series

For her performance in Damien Chazelle's biographical drama film First Man (2018), Foy was nominated for the Golden Globe Award for Best Supporting Actress – Motion Picture, the Critics' Choice Movie Award for Best Supporting Actress, and the BAFTA Award for Best Actress in a Supporting Role. She also received a Critics' Choice Movie Award as a role model for the "#SeeHer movement", a professional media movement sponsored by media companies for the furthering of women onscreen.

== Major associations ==
=== BAFTA Awards ===
| Year | Category | Nominated work | Result | Ref. |
British Academy Film Awards
| 2018 | Best Actress in a Supporting Role | First Man | Nominated | |
| 2023 | Best Actress in a Supporting Role | All of Us Strangers | Nominated | |
British Academy Television Awards
| 2016 | Best Actress | Wolf Hall | Nominated | |
| 2017 | Best Actress | The Crown | Nominated | |
| 2018 | Best Actress | The Crown | Nominated | |

=== Emmy Awards ===
| Year | Category | Nominated work | Result | Ref. |
Primetime Emmy Awards
| 2017 | Outstanding Lead Actress in a Drama Series | The Crown (episode: "Assassins") | Nominated | |
| 2018 | Outstanding Lead Actress in a Drama Series | The Crown (episode: "Dear Mrs. Kennedy") | Won | |
| 2021 | Outstanding Guest Actress in a Drama Series | The Crown (episode: "48:1") | Won | |
| 2024 | Outstanding Guest Actress in a Drama Series | The Crown (episode: "Sleep, Dearie, Sleep") | Nominated | |

=== Golden Globe Awards ===
| Year | Category | Nominated work | Result | Ref. |
|---|---|---|---|---|
| 2017 | Best Actress – Television Series Drama | The Crown | Won | |
| 2018 | Best Actress – Television Series Drama | The Crown | Nominated | |
| 2019 | Best Supporting Actress – Motion Picture | First Man | Nominated | |

=== Independent Spirit Awards ===
| Year | Category | Nominated work | Result | Ref. |
|---|---|---|---|---|
| 2023 | Robert Altman Award | Women Talking | Won | |

=== Screen Actors Guild Awards ===
| Year | Category | Nominated work | Result | Ref. |
|---|---|---|---|---|
| 2017 | Outstanding Ensemble in a Drama Series | The Crown (season 1) | Nominated | |
| 2017 | Outstanding Female Actor in a Drama Series | The Crown (season 1) | Won | |
| 2018 | Outstanding Ensemble in a Drama Series | The Crown (season 2) | Nominated | |
| 2018 | Outstanding Female Actor in a Drama Series | The Crown (season 2) | Won | |
| 2023 | Outstanding Cast in a Motion Picture | Women Talking | Nominated | |

== Miscellaneous awards ==
=== British Independent Film Awards ===
| Year | Category | Nominated work | Result | Ref. |
|---|---|---|---|---|
| 2023 | Best Supporting Performance | All of Us Strangers | Nominated | |

=== Broadcasting Press Guild Awards ===
| Year | Category | Nominated work | Result | Ref. |
|---|---|---|---|---|
| 2017 | Best Actress | The Crown | Nominated | |
| 2018 | Best Actress | The Crown | Won | |

=== Gotham Awards ===
| Year | Category | Nominated work | Result | Ref. |
|---|---|---|---|---|
| 2023 | Outstanding Supporting Performance | All of Us Strangers | Nominated | |

=== Monte-Carlo Television Festival Awards ===
| Year | Category | Nominated work | Result | Ref. |
|---|---|---|---|---|
| 2016 | Best Actress – Long Fiction Program | Wolf Hall | Nominated | |

=== National Board of Review Award ===
| Year | Category | Nominated work | Result | Ref. |
|---|---|---|---|---|
| 2022 | Best Ensemble | Women Talking | Won | |

=== Royal Television Society ===
| Year | Category | Nominated work | Result | Ref. |
|---|---|---|---|---|
| 2009 | Best Female Actor | Little Dorrit | Nominated | |

=== Satellite Awards ===
| Year | Category | Nominated work | Result | Ref. |
|---|---|---|---|---|
| 2016 | Best Actress – Miniseries or Television Film | Wolf Hall | Nominated | |
| 2019 | Best Supporting Actress – Motion Picture | First Man | Nominated | |
| 2023 | Best Supporting Actress – Motion Picture | Women Talking | Won | |

=== WhatsOnStage Awards ===
| Year | Category | Nominated work | Result | Ref. |
|---|---|---|---|---|
| 2020 | Best Actress in a Play | Lungs | Won | |

=== Zurich Film Festival ===
| Year | Category | Nominated work | Result | Ref. |
|---|---|---|---|---|
| 2025 | Golden Eye Award | H Is for Hawk | Won | |

== Critic awards ==
=== Critics' Choice Awards ===
| Year | Category | Nominated work | Result | Ref. |
Critics' Choice Movie Awards
| 2019 | Best Supporting Actress | First Man | Nominated | |
| 2019 | #SeeHer Award | | Won | |
| 2023 | Best Acting Ensemble | Women Talking | Nominated | |
Critics' Choice Television Awards
| 2015 | Best Supporting Actress in a Movie or Limited Series | Wolf Hall | Nominated | |
| 2018 | Best Actress in a Drama Series | The Crown | Nominated | |

=== Television Critics Association Awards ===
| Year | Category | Nominated work | Result | Ref. |
|---|---|---|---|---|
| 2017 | Individual Achievement in Drama | The Crown | Nominated | |

=== Miscellaneous Critics Associations ===
| Year | Association | Category | Nominated work | Result | Ref. |
|---|---|---|---|---|---|
| 2018 | Dallas-Fort Worth Film Critics Association | Best Supporting Actress | First Man | 5th Place | |
| 2018 | Florida Film Critics Circle | Best Supporting Actress | First Man | Runner-up | |
| 2018 | Seattle Film Critics Society | Best Supporting Actress | First Man | Nominated | |
| 2018 | Vancouver Film Critics Circle | Best Supporting Actress | First Man | Nominated | |
| 2019 | Alliance of Women Film Journalists | Best Supporting Actress | First Man | Nominated | |
| 2019 | Austin Film Critics Association | Best Supporting Actress | First Man | Nominated | |
| 2019 | Georgia Film Critics Association | Best Supporting Actress | First Man | Nominated | |
| 2019 | Houston Film Critics Society | Best Supporting Actress | First Man | Nominated | |
| 2019 | London Film Critics Circle | Supporting Actress of the Year | First Man | Nominated | |
| 2019 | London Film Critics Circle | British/Irish Actress of the Year | First Man | Nominated | |
| 2022 | Boston Society of Film Critics Awards | Best Ensemble Cast | Women Talking | Won | |
| 2022 | Online Association of Female Film Critics | Best Acting Ensemble | Women Talking | Won | |
| 2022 | St. Louis Gateway Film Critics Association | Best Supporting Actress | Women Talking | Nominated | |
| 2022 | Sunset Film Circle Awards | Best Supporting Actress | Women Talking | 2nd Place | |
| 2023 | DiscussingFilm Critics Awards | Best Supporting Actress | Women Talking | Nominated | |
| 2023 | Girls on Film Awards | Best Ensemble Cast | Women Talking | Nominated | |
| 2023 | International Online Cinema Awards | Best Ensemble Cast | Women Talking | Nominated | |
| 2023 | San Francisco Bay Area Film Critics Circle | Best Supporting Actress | Women Talking | Nominated | |
| 2024 | International Cinephile Society | Best Supporting Actress | All of Us Strangers | Nominated | |
| 2024 | International Cinephile Society | Best Ensemble | All of Us Strangers | Won | |
| 2024 | London Film Critics Circle | Supporting Actress of the Year | All of Us Strangers | Nominated | |
| 2024 | Minnesota Film Critics Alliance | Best Supporting Actress | All of Us Strangers | Nominated | |
