= Falconry training and technique =

Methods for training birds of prey to hunt on a human's behalf

Falconry training and technique is a complex undertaking. Raptor training regimes can be highly variable across different species of raptors, and the possession of any raptor is typically strictly controlled by national and regional laws. Beginners interested in flying raptors generally need to train under a licensed falconer who will sponsor them through an apprenticeship period.

== Equipment ==
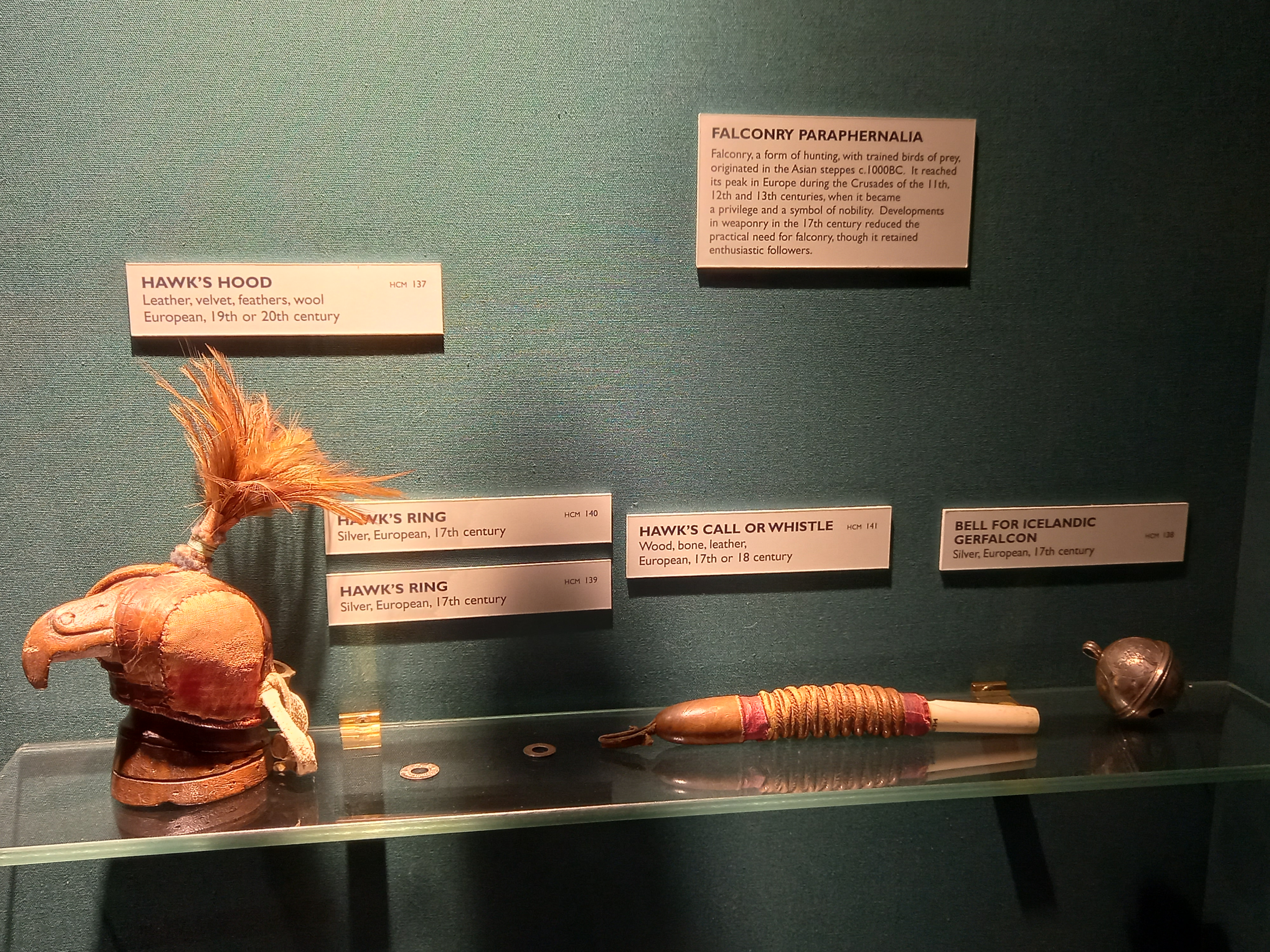
Various pieces of falconry equipment (Hunt Museum, Ireland) – includes rings, call, bell and hood from the 17th–20th centuries.

The bird wears:

- A hood, which is used in the manning process (acclimatising to humans and the human world) and to keep the raptor in a calm state, both in the early part of its training and throughout its falconry career. There are various styles and types of hood for raptors within falconry. The hood is handmade, often from kip leather or suitable kangaroo leather. There are two standard types used in American/European falconry: the Anglo Indian hood (non-blocked) and the Dutch hood. The Anglo-Indian hood is made from one piece of leather. The Dutch hood is a three piece hood blocked on a special mould called a "hood block", which is designed to best represent the shape of the raptor's head, also allowing space for the eyes with an adequate neck width.
- A bell, or pair of bells, on its legs (attached via small leather strips called bewits), which are used to locate the bird at close range in thick brush.
- An identity band on the leg, in most countries.

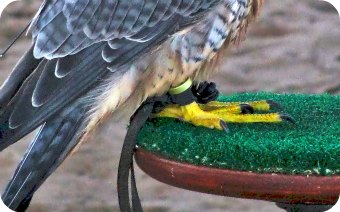
An example of jesses.

- Strips of strong leather (nowadays often kangaroo) called jesses on both legs.
- Very often, a telemetry transmitter, so that it may be recovered if lost during free flight.

Falcons (the long-wing family of raptors) are tethered perched on a block; large owls (during training only) and short-winged and broad-winged hawks are tethered to a bow perch or round perch, when not allowed to fly free in their mews, an Old English word for a raptor's chamber. (The term is "mews" whether singular or plural; the word "mews" came from French muer which means "to change" or "to molt", i.e. where the hawk was kept while it was molting.)

=== Jesses ===
There are three styles of jesses. Traditional is a single strap specially knotted onto the bird. Aylmeri is a two part restraint featuring an anklet that is grommeted on and a removable jess strap. Some Aylmeri jess straps have dental rubber bands on them to make it more difficult for the bird to pull out the jess, but they are still removable if the bird gets caught up outdoors. The third type of jesses is a combination of the two, referred to as "false Aylmeri." These use an anklet as well, but a brass eyelet is slipped through far enough away that the toes will not get caught in it; there are two straps attached to the anklet, flying jesses and mews jesses. Both can be removed. A good reference on these jesses is "Care And Management of Captive Raptors" by Lori Arent & Mark Martell, published by the University of Minnesota: this guide is very popular with zoos and wildlife centers, though it is not a traditional falconry book.

The singular of "jesses" is correctly "jess", but one jess is often mistakenly called a "jessie", by wrong back-formation from "jesses" treated as "jessies", which would be pronounced the same.

Nylon Aylmeri jesses have recently grown in popularity. Thinner, lighter, and stronger, they do not rot or need oiling to stay supple. The anklets are grommetted on, like their leather counterparts, but instead of a folded button keeping the straps from falling through the anklets, a knot is used. The end of the knot is melted with a cigarette lighter to keep it from fraying. In order to form the loops the swivel or clips will attach to, a nylon parachute cord is hollowed out, threaded up through itself using an awl, and knotted.

The swivel is to prevent tangling and twisting of the leash or tether when the bird is active but not hunting. The swivel consists of two parts that twist freely, each with a metal hoop on the end. The swivel may be traditional, or modified. The modified swivel has much larger metal hoops than the traditional. While swivels have been made of cloth or other materials in the past, most modern falconers use metal swivels.

When using Aylmeri jesses, there are usually two sets of straps; the mews strap, for manning and tethering the bird, and flying straps. The flying straps are lighter and smaller for hunting; the mews straps are heavy and less likely to break with stress.

Most importantly, hunting/flying jesses do not have the slit which can often get caught on a branch or bush, leaving the bird hanging too high up in the tree to be retrieved. Since using mews jesses in the field is dangerous to the bird, educated falconers no longer risk them. Instead, they are changed out before the bird is released to fly free, and the mews jesses returned into the grommets after the free-flight is over and the bird is safely in hand.

Jesses and anklets need to be replaced periodically, and checked for fit if they are causing injury.

=== Scale ===
A weighing scale is used to weigh the bird and its food. The scale must be reliable. This is especially important when dealing with small birds, as they may be endangered by even small weight differences when at flying weight. The successful hunting weight of the bird may vary, usually increasing as the bird is flown and develops more muscle (which weighs more than fat), but there is a relatively narrow range which the falconer seeks. Below that weight, the bird will be unnecessarily (and perhaps even dangerously) low and weak. Even the jesses lying on the scale can change the reading, so the falconer has to be careful to lift them up while the bird is being weighed. Above that range of weight, the bird will be unresponsive in the field, lacking in motivation to hunt or return to the falconer in timely fashion.

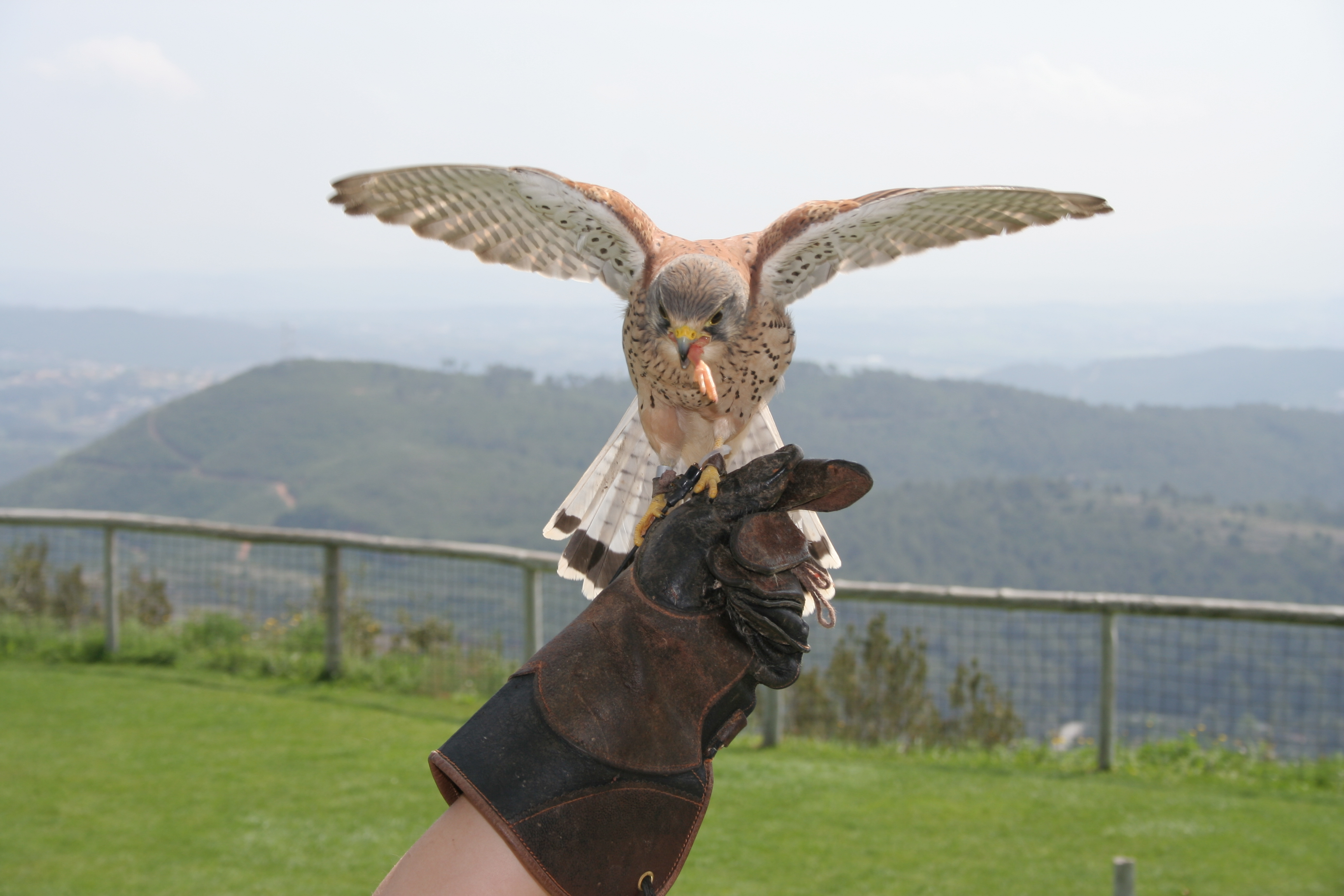
A European kestrel (Falco tinnunculus) landing on its falconer's hand, showing the style of gauntlet typically used for falcons.

=== Gauntlets ===
Gauntlets or gloves are used by the falconer to turn the arm into a suitable perching surface. Falconry gloves may only cover the fist and wrist, while gauntlets for larger species extend to the elbow. An eagle glove may cover the entire arm and a portion of the chest, or it may be a heavy sheath worn over a standard hawking glove. The glove will have to be replaced with wear.

=== Creance ===
A creance is a thin line used as a precautionary lead or guide when flying a hawk or falcon in an open space. It allows the handler to maintain control over the bird during training, when the bird's recall is expected to be untrustworthy. This may be when the bird is in an early stage of training, at a heavy weight, or going through environmental, hormonal, or metabolic changes that alter the bird's motivation.

The creance typically is made of a lightweight, braided, and strong line or cord that is secured to the bird's jesses on one end and held by the handler on the other end to manage slack. The creance is not intended to be felt by the bird, unlike how a leash is designed to allow tension between the handler and the animal, and can result in an injury of the bird if the bird is stopped by the line too suddenly. The end away from the bird is most often wound around the spindle like a kite string; the creance can be wound or unwound with a single hand. This provides a means of storing the creance, and also provides a drag weight if the bird decides to fly off.

== Housing ==
A falconry bird is usually housed in a mew. Mews in the US have to be inspected for compliance with federal and state laws. These laws ensure that the facilities meet what is required to safely and humanely house a bird of prey. The mews (along with other perching equipment) are carefully designed to prevent bodily injury and especially feather damage. The laws and regulations generally prescribe characteristics that would allow a captive raptor some measure of security and health maintenance in the absence of an attentive experienced falconer. The mews may be used as a free-flight arrangement (especially during the summer molt or change of feathers) or it may provide a place for tethering the raptor during the night—during the day, when not actually hunting, the bird might be kept perched on a grassy lawn. Much depends on the species of raptor, the housing of the falconer, the weather, and the style of keeping, training and hunting. The less a bird is hunted, the more important the mews and domestic quarters.

In the UK the only law concerned requires the bird to be able to spread its wings in all directions, however in practice a much greater space is needed to avoid conditions such as bumblefoot and depression. This lack of laws in the UK is the source of much concern among raptor keepers.

== Diet ==
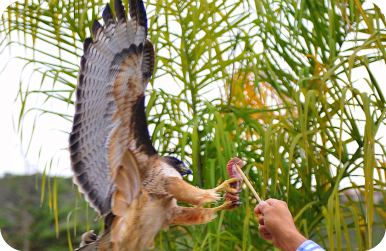
A red-tailed hawk being given its meal

There are different schools of thought when it comes to feeding falconry birds. Some falconers feed meat based on its nutritional value to control how hungry the bird is. If pure meat is fed, falconers must feed additional roughage, such as fur and feathers, as most raptors require them to digest properly. Roughage cleans out the crop, and is regurgitated in a football shaped pellet called a casting. Alternatively, falconers feed their birds whole food such as mouse or quail, reducing the need for supplements and additional roughage. All birds of prey eat a strictly carnivorous diet.

In all cases, a bird's diet is carefully measured to control its weight. Weight determines how hungry the bird is and how lazy it will act. A bird that is overweight will be more likely to fly away or not hunt. A bird that is somewhat underweight will act aggressively, and a bird that is severely underweight will have health problems.

== Manning ==
Manning is an essential part of falconry training that refers to the acclimation of a falconry bird to living and working with humans and things typically associated with humans, such as other pets, houses, or automobiles. The better manned a falconry bird is, the more calm and less likely it will be to engage in a fight or flight response around people.

== Wild-caught birds ==
A wild bird in juvenile plumage is called a passage, meaning it is under a year old. These birds are typically captured during migration. When a wild bird is used in falconry, passage birds are preferred. Since many of these birds would otherwise die (estimates run from 30 to 70 percent) within their first year, the taking of juvenile hawks by falconers has no noticeable effect on raptor populations. Baited traps used for hawks are unlike typical hunting traps in that they are specifically designed to avoid harming the hawk.

Birds that are in adult plumage are called haggards and are no longer commonly used in falconry. The reason for this is twofold: first, birds that have matured in the wild are considerably harder to train for return (when released for hunting haggards have a tendency to go off hunting on their own and are easily lost); second, the capture of an adult bird removes a breeding age bird from the local pool of viable adults.

Taking a bird from the wild is generally prohibited in the UK, but some exceptions (Schedule 4 Species under the Wildlife and Countryside Act) require only registration. However, non-native wild birds captured outside of the U.K. and European Union may be possessed without a license. In the United States, trapping or attempting to trap any native species of bird is a federal crime under the Migratory Bird Treaty Act. However, trapping exemptions are provided for falconers holding a license to do so. A falconry permit allows a falconer to trap certain birds at certain times of the year. Some states in the U.S. have raffles to issue licenses of certain birds (e.g., peregrine falcon).

== Imprinted versus non-imprinted captive-bred birds ==
A falconry bird taken from the nest as a fledgling is called an 'eyass' (by misdivision of French un niais from Latin nidiscus, from Latin nidus = "nest"). In addition to wild-taken eyass hawks, all captive-bred hawks at this stage are referred to as 'captive-bred eyass' hawks. Eyass hawks sometimes become 'food-aggressive', screaming for food or attention or being unnecessarily 'footy' (grabbing aggressively at the falconer). Vigilant care regimes must be followed to prevent these behaviours in the eyass hawk.

Rearing an imprinted bird so that it has few undesirable behaviors is time-consuming and requires consistent training for about three months. During that time, the eyass should not become hungry, and be kept in consistent contact with humans, so that the arrival of food is not associated with the arrival of humans. This bird is still imprinted on humans, but not food-imprinted, so the human is not considered something to be screamed at or attacked when hungry. Some falconers allow an eyass to "find" food laid out in advance to further reduce the chances of the bird associating humans with food delivery, as parent birds would provide.

== Telemetry ==
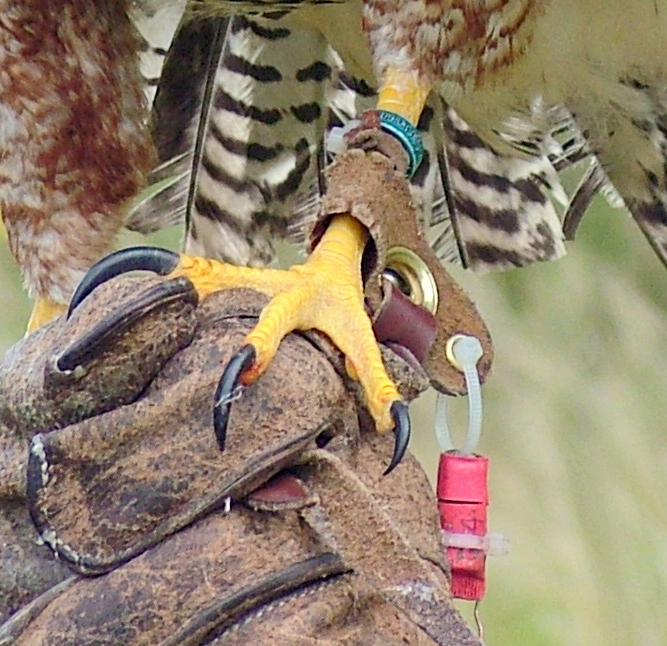
A transmitter attached to a hawk's anklet.

In order to track a raptor that has flown away, many falconers use radio telemetry. Typically a transmitter is temporarily attached to the leg at the jess or on a bewit. Sometimes a mount for it may be attached to one of the center tail feathers by careful application of glue. Recently, a lightweight harness made of Teflon tape has been employed as a means of hanging the transmitter off the middle of the bird's back (out of the way of the bird's flight and footing, so as to minimize interference with the hunt.) The transmitter emits a radio beep, which the falconer can track with a portable receiver.

In some U.S. states (e.g., Connecticut), the law requires that all captive-bred raptors must be fitted with a radio transmitter, with hybrids requiring two separate transmitters for free flights. The use of hybrid birds and species exotic to the falconer's locale is discouraged by the International Association for Falconry due to concerns of genetic introgression with wild raptor populations.

== Beginning falconry ==
Falconry requires a great deal of effort, with even experienced falconers keeping only one to two birds at a time. Contacting a local falconry club or association is usually the first step to learning.

The body mass of a bird can influence how easy it is to work with them, with small species being especially difficult. For example, some falconers recommend that beginners do not start with small falcons like kestrels. Small birds are especially susceptible to health problems caused by weight fluctuations. If the bird is a non-imprinted captive-bred, it is very important to establish that the falconer will facilitate hunting, and food is the reward for the bird's participation.

The use of owls for falconry, while permitted in some jurisdictions, can be extremely difficult. Owls prefer hunting at night, and likely will not perform as well during normal falconry outings as their diurnal raptor counterparts. The safety of an owl is also at risk during diurnal flights, as it is likely to be mobbed by wild birds.

In the United States, state laws often restrict apprentices to red-tailed hawks and American kestrels (e.g., Indiana and New Mexico). Other states allow for more lenient standards in line with the Code of Federal Regulations guidance (e.g., South Carolina, which allows "any Falconiform or Strigiform species"). The language of 50 CFR § 21.82 is outdated, referring to hawks, eagles, and vultures as Falconiformes rather than Accipitriformes – these species have been demonstrated via DNA analyses to not be closely related to falcons or caracaras.

== See also ==
- Hack (falconry)

== Suggested reading and sources ==
- Beatriz E. Candil, Arjen E. Hartman, Ars Accipitraria: An Essential Dictionary for the Practice of Falconry and hawking; Yarak Publishing, London, 2007, ISBN 978-0-9555607-0-5
- North American Falconry And Hunting Hawks by Hal Webster and Frank Beebe
- Care And Management Of Captive Raptors, Arent & Martell, University of Minnesota's Raptor Center
- Understanding the Bird of Prey, Nick Fox, Hancock House (ISBN 0-88839-317-2)
- Falconry and Hawking, Phillip Glasier, Bastford, (ISBN 0-7134-8407-1)
