= Bumblefoot =

Bumblefoot may refer to:

- Bumblefoot (infection), an infection found on the feet of birds of prey and some animals
- Ron "Bumblefoot" Thal (born 1969), musician
