= Stringfoot =

Pigeon condition caused by human-generated debris

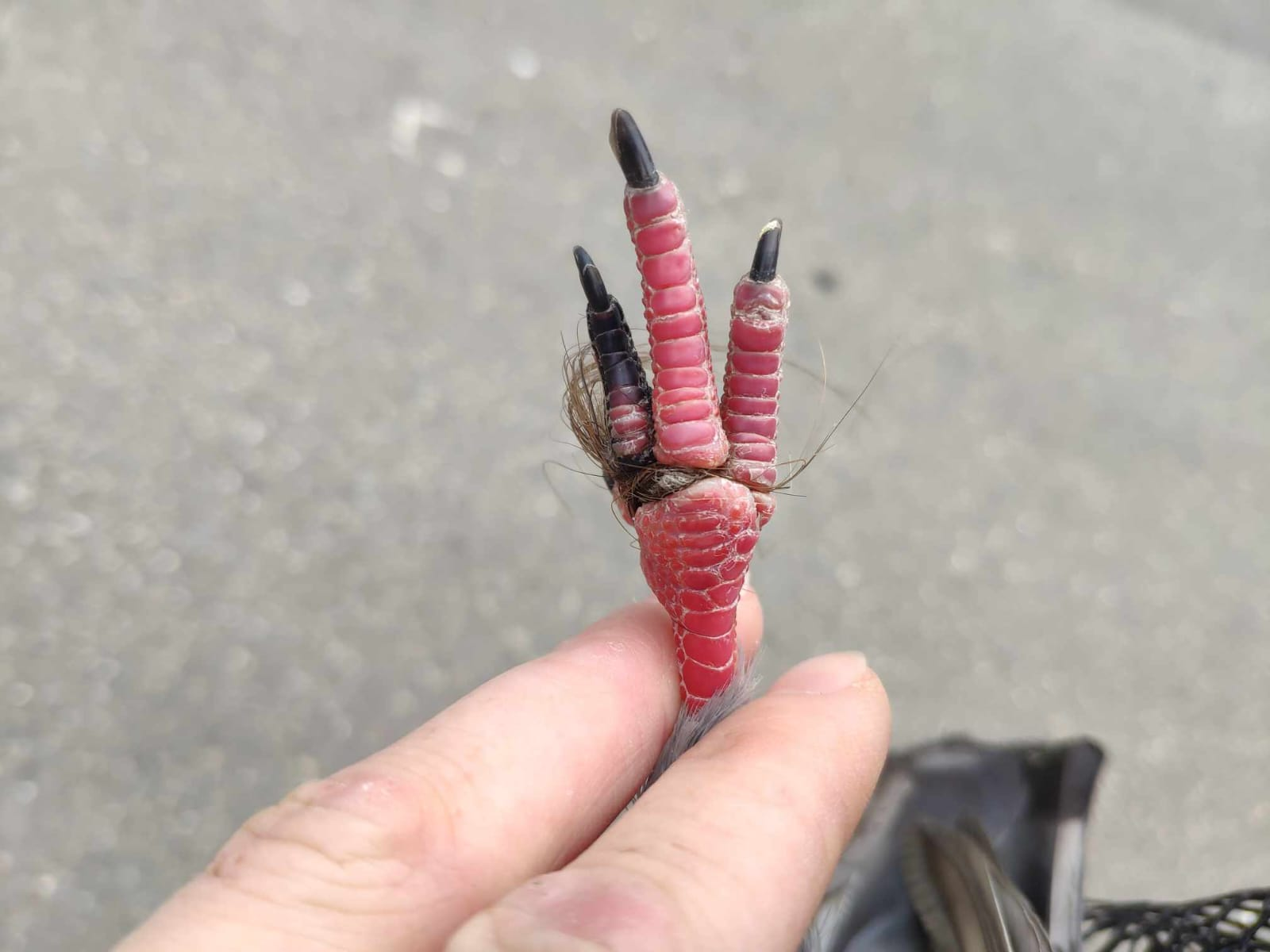
A pigeon's foot tightly wound with human hair, with a necrotic toe.

Stringfoot is a condition where the feet of urban-dwelling pigeons are entangled with foreign matter, most commonly observed to be human hair and string. These fibers tightens around their digits, constricting the movement of the pigeon, and eventually cut off blood supply leading to painful necrosis that cause the toes to fall off. The entanglement is likely a result of their foraging behavior on pavements and walkways where these waste materials have been improperly disposed or simply released from humans. Furthermore, some pigeons build nests with these waste materials in lieu of access to natural alternatives, causing more severe cases of stringfoot as their chicks grow with their feet bound in them.

== Misconceptions ==
There have been some hypotheses presented to explain the particularity of the foot deformities. The first is that these deformities arise from infections by Staphylococcus bacteria, brought on by the birds' behavior of standing in their own excrement. These infections result in an inflamed and abnormally enlarged foot, known as bumblefoot. The second is that the injuries are sustained by pigeons caught by physical deterrents. Finally, it could simply be hereditary conditions that have been similarly observed in captive pigeons. However, the basal healed wounds of urban pigeons more likely support that the manner of injury is a result of stringfoot. A study across 46 sites in Paris also revealed that for pigeons with at least one damaged toe, the number of mutilations could be predicted by the density of human population and air pollution in the area.

== Intervention ==
The prevalence of stringfoot has motivated pigeon-loving communities in cities to practice "destringing", where they lure and catch pigeons to remove the strings. This practice has its unique challenges, as many cities have regulations and bans on feeding pigeons imposed for the sake of population control, preventing property damage, and public health. It might also take consistent interactions and feeding sessions with local pigeons to establish trust and get close enough to catch them.
