= Attenborough: 60 Years in the Wild =

- Genre: Nature; Documentary
- Directed by: Miles Barton
- Presented by: David Attenborough
- Country of origin: United Kingdom
- Original language: English
- No. of series: 1
- No. of episodes: 3

Production
- Executive producer: Alastair Fothergill
- Producer: Miles Barton
- Running time: 60 minutes
- Production companies: BBC, Thirteen, WNET New York Public Media

Original release
- Release: 16 November – 30 November 2012

Attenborough: 60 Years in the Wild is a three-part BBC documentary series chronicling the 60 years career making wildlife programmes of Sir David Attenborough. The first hour-long programme, titled "Life on Camera" was broadcast on Friday 16 November 2012 on BBC Two at 9pm. The second part, "Understanding the Natural World" and third and final part, "Our Fragile Planet" were broadcast on following Fridays, 23 and 30 November 2012.

== Scope ==
The series is billed by the BBC as "Over three very personal films, Sir David Attenborough looks back at the unparalleled changes in natural history that he has witnessed during his 60-year career."

The linking scenes for the series were filmed in Borneo, specifically in Sabah, Malaysia, in October 2011.

== Episodes ==
All episode names from BBC website.

=== "Life on Camera" ===
In this episode Attenborough "looks back on the iconic animal encounters which have shaped his career". These include the first natural history film he ever saw, a "fanciful story of penguins presented by eccentric Englishman Cherry Kearton"; his early work on the black and white Zoo Quest series, where he had to describe the colour of the animals shown; and recalling his first landmark series Life on Earth, and how jet travel enabled him to visit 30 countries for filming for the series in three years. He revisits Borneo, talks about a night-time encounter with a lion pride, and shows how to catch a Komodo dragon. He also discusses the technological advancements in wildlife film-making over the past 60 years.

=== "Understanding the Natural World" ===
In this episode Attenborough explored the incredible scientific breakthroughs within his lifetime that have helped to shape an understanding of the world. He talked of the early interviews he conducted with biologist Konrad Lorenz, who was famous for his discoveries about the behaviour of geese (the "imprinting" of young goslings on the first things they saw on hatching meant Lorenz was able to observe them closely as they regarded him as their parent). The sequence illustrating imprinting was filmed with hand-reared greylag geese supplied by the bird specialists Lloyd and Rose Buck: the goslings treated Rose Buck as their mother, following her as she drove a quad bike and then taking to the air after a boat carrying Buck and Attenborough. He also talked of Stanley Miller's groundbreaking experiment in the 1950s that first demonstrated how the chemical "primordial soup" could be transformed by electricity into the basic building blocks of life.

Attenborough also covered the various series he presented that brought key scientific theories to a mass audience. His first landmark series for the BBC, Life on Earth, first broadcast in the 1970s, covered the story of evolution by following in the footsteps of Attenborough's hero Charles Darwin, and discussing and illustrating Darwin's theory of natural selection. This episode also dealt with the black smokers, deep sea volcanic vents that were found, unexpectedly, to support abundant life. Also covered were tortoises, lung fish and salamanders, and tiktaalik fossils from Canada. Attenborough talked of being a geology student at Cambridge and how he was interested in the distribution of life on the planet. In The Living Planet series, he filmed in front of an erupting volcano (narrowly avoiding being hit by lava bombs), and discussed the theory of continental drift - how whole continents are moved around the globe over millions of years - by the action of plate tectonics. This great scientific mystery was not solved until the 1960s.

Attenborough also explored how animals communicate, looking at woodpeckers, cicadas, wolves, seabirds on Lord Howe Island, vervet monkeys, and lizards in Florida. He discussed Alfred Wallace's seminal book The Malay Archipelago and the birds of paradise pictured within it, and his own 1957 Zoo Quest programme that explored the area, and how he returned there in 1996 for more filming. In 1957 his film crew were confronted by tribesmen in the Wagi River area of Papua New Guinea. Attenborough also discussed bower birds, The Selfish Gene by Richard Dawkins, ants and meerkats.

Also covered in this episode were molecular genetics, and DNA fingerprinting, which was first developed at Leicester University (where his father was principal in earlier years). Attenborough included excerpts from his series The Life of Birds, including a piece on hedge sparrows, and also explored Jane Goodall's work with chimpanzees and their use of tools to crack nuts, and their hunting of colobus monkeys in groups. Attenborough showed the books containing the whole of the decoded human genome.

=== "Our Fragile Planet" ===
In this episode, Attenborough told the story of the changes in the environment, the pioneering conservationists in whose footsteps he followed, and of the revolution in attitudes towards nature. He discussed what inspired him to become a conservationist, as well as owning up to the wildlife he has eaten. He recalled how early programmes in which he had been involved displayed a very different attitude to conservation: in Zoo Quest he travelled the globe collecting wild animals for London Zoo. On a tropical beach in Malaysia, he recalled how, in the 1950s, after weeks of monotonous travel rations, he dug up turtle eggs to eat. In 2011 he made recompense by returning to release newly hatched turtles into the wild. He remembers his personal encounters with mountain gorillas, blue whales and giant tortoises. He documented how blue whales, driven to near-extinction by hunting, were now making a comeback thanks to conservation efforts from pressure groups like Greenpeace. The plight of other threatened species were also highlighted, including the alarming decline in amphibians, insects, otters and rhinoceroses. The launch of Apollo 8 in 1968 allowed us to think globally and see the threat to the planet with views of the shrinkage to the polar ice caps becoming visible and coral reefs dying as a result of climate change. Finally Attenborough queried whether our changing attitudes and our greater knowledge of the world will be enough to save it for future generations.
