= Helen Macdonald (writer) =

British writer

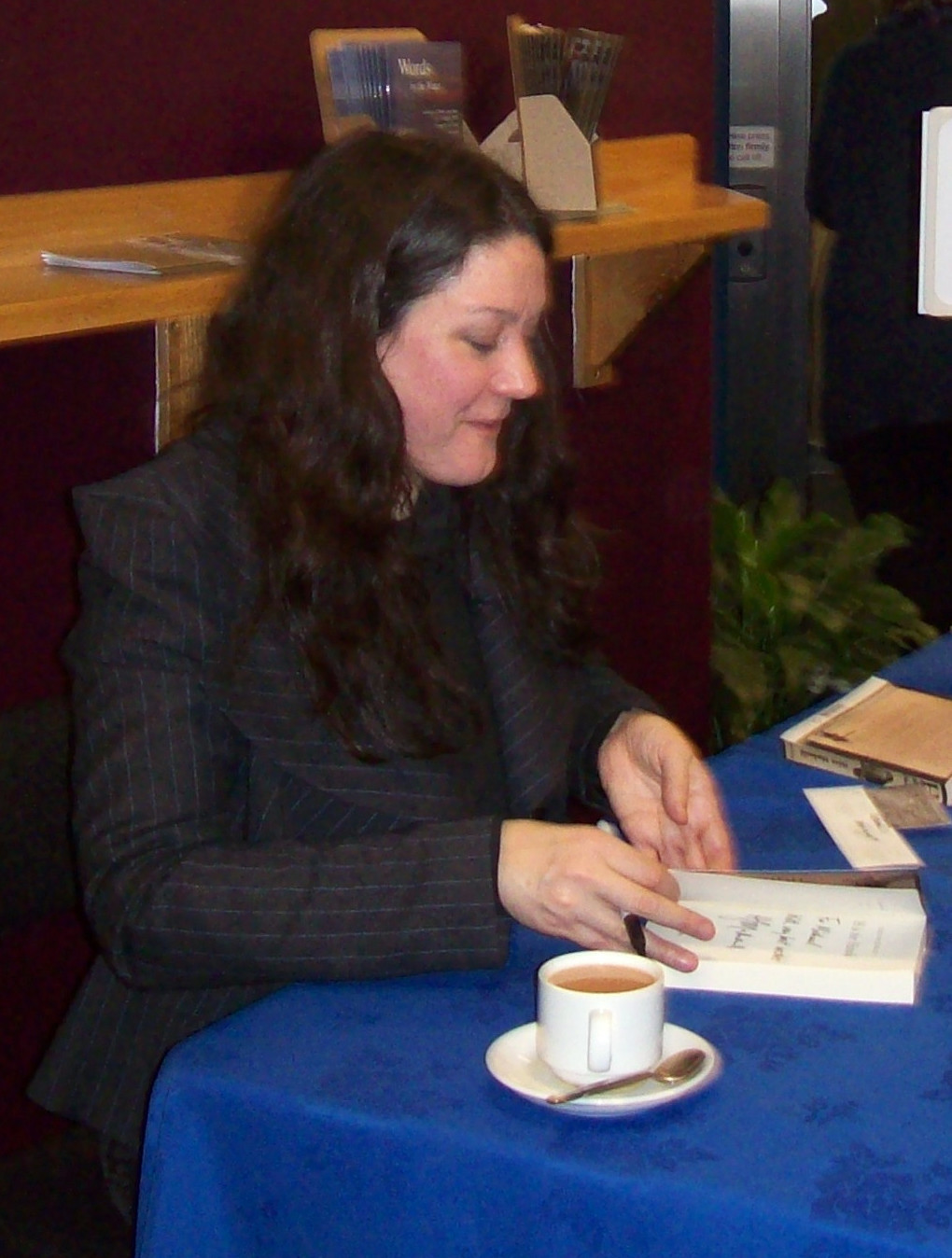
Macdonald in 2015

Helen Macdonald (born 1970) is an English writer and naturalist. They are best known as the author of H is for Hawk, which won the 2014 Samuel Johnson Prize and Costa Book Award; in 2016, the book won the Prix du Meilleur Livre Étranger in France.

== Early life ==
Macdonald was born in 1970, the child of Daily Mirror photojournalist Alisdair Macdonald, and grew up in Surrey. Writing about their childhood for The Guardian in 2018, Macdonald said,

"I grew up in Camberley, a Victorian town on the A30 in Surrey. It was made of pine forests, golf courses, elderly army officers with parade ground voices, Conservative clubs and tea dances. In 1975 my parents had bought a little white house in Tekels Park, a private estate near the town centre. It was owned by the Theosophical Society. My parents were journalists and knew nothing of theosophy, but they loved the Park, and I did too. No place has so indelibly shaped my writing life".

Macdonald read English at New Hall, Cambridge (now Murray Edwards College) from 1989 to 1992. They then worked in falcon research in Wales and the Gulf States.

They were a research fellow at Jesus College, Cambridge from 2004 to 2007, and an affiliated research scholar at the Department of History and Philosophy of Science, University of Cambridge, until 2015. In 2022 Macdonald was elected as an honorary fellow at Jesus College.

== Career ==
Macdonald has written and narrated several radio programmes, and appeared on television in the BBC Four documentary series, Birds Britannia, in 2010. Their books include Shaler's Fish (2001), Falcon (2006), H is for Hawk (2014), and Vesper Flights (2020). Macdonald received critical acclaim for H is for Hawk, including the 2014 Samuel Johnson Prize for non-fiction and the Costa Book Award. The book—which also became a Sunday Times best-seller—describes the year Macdonald spent after the death of their father training a Eurasian goshawk named Mabel, and includes biographical material about the naturalist and writer T. H. White.

Macdonald also helped make the film 10 X Murmuration with filmmaker Sarah Wood as part of a 2015 exhibition at the Brighton Festival. In H is for Hawk: A New Chapter, part of BBC's Natural World series in 2017, they trained a new goshawk chick.

Macdonald presented the BBC Four documentary, The Hidden Wilds of the Motorway, in 2020. That same year saw the publication of a fourth book, Vesper Flights, a collection of essays about "the human relationship to the natural world". In 2023, with Sinistra Blaché, they published a novel, Prophet.

In February 2024, it was announced Claire Foy would play Macdonald in the film of H is for Hawk. Principal photography began in Cambridge in November 2024.

== Personal life ==
Macdonald is non-binary and uses they and she pronouns. They have attention deficit hyperactivity disorder.

Macdonald lives in Hawkedon, Suffolk. Their goshawk, Mabel, died of aspergillosis in 2014. They resided with a parrot, Birdoole, who died in 2021.

== Bibliography ==
- Shaler's Fish. St Leonards on Sea: Etruscan Books. 2001. ISBN 978-1901538335.
- Falcon. London: Reaktion Books Ltd. 2006. ISBN 978-1861892386.
- H is for Hawk. London: Jonathan Cape. 2014. ISBN 978-0224097000.
- Falcon, new edition. London: Reaktion Books Ltd. 2016. ISBN 978-1780236414.
- Vesper Flights. London: Jonathan Cape. 2020. ISBN 978-0224097017.
- "Learning from the birds". Spring Reflection. New Statesman. 149 (5514): 34–35. 3–23 April 2020.
- Macdonald, Helen; Blaché, Sinistra (2023). Prophet. London: Jonathan Cape. ISBN 978-1787334298.

=== Poetry ===
Collections

- Simple objects. Cambridge: Peter Riley. 1993.
