= My Son (2021 Christian Carion film) =

- Official release poster
- Directed by: Christian Carion
- Screenplay by: Christian Carion; Laure Irrmann
- Based on: My Son by Christian Carion
- Produced by: Marc Butan; Christian Carion; Brahim Chioua; Laure Irrman; Vincent Maraval; Rebecca O'Brien
- Starring: James McAvoy; Claire Foy
- Cinematography: Eric Dumont
- Edited by: Loïc Lallemand
- Music by: Laurent Perez del Mar
- Production companies: STXfilms; MadRiver Pictures; Une Hirondelle Productions; Canal+; Ciné+; Wild Bunch International; Wild Bunch Germany; Sixteen Films
- Distributed by: Peacock The Roku Channel (United States); Amazon Prime Video (United Kingdom)
- Release dates: September 15, 2021 (United States; first release); December 15, 2021 (United States; second release); January 21, 2022 (United Kingdom)
- Running time: 95 minutes
- Countries: United States; United Kingdom; Germany
- Language: English
- Box office: $962,689

My Son is a 2021 mystery thriller film written and directed by Christian Carion. It is an English-language remake of Carion's 2017 French film Mon garçon, and stars James McAvoy and Claire Foy. McAvoy was not supplied with a script or dialogue, only the knowledge of his own character's backstory, and improvises his way through the film.

== Plot ==
Edmond Murray is an absentee father called to the site of his son Ethan's disappearance. He briefly consoles his former wife Joan there, and is interviewed by Inspector Roy. Edmond visits Joan's new partner, Frank, and discovers Frank's plans for a new home don't include a bedroom for Ethan. Angered to learn that Frank gave Joan Valium to help her sleep, Edmond accuses Frank of being responsible for his son's disappearance, knocks him unconscious and steals his phone. Edmond is arrested but Frank doesn't file charges, understanding Edmond's stress.

Inspector Roy tells Edmond he's been taken off Ethan's disappearance without any explanation. Edmond searches Frank's phone, finding two videos of Ethan, two weeks apart, and noticing a car present in both. Joan's brother in the insurance industry obtains the vehicle owner's address for him.

Edmont travels to an isolated farm belonging to William O'Connor, ambushes him, and tortures him with an oxy–acetylene torch. O'Connor admits he sends pictures of children outside of schools to a kidnapping ring operated for paedophiles, who select children to be abducted. He reveals Ethan is being held at a hilltop lodge. Joan arrives at the farm after Edmond leaves, and finds a kidnapped girl unconscious in the back of O'Connor's vehicle. She drops the child at a hospital and contacts Inspector Roy with the location of the lodge she received by text message from Edmond.

Edmond finds three members of the kidnap ring at the lodge. He incapacitates their vehicle before they can take the unconscious Ethan away. Edmond knocks out Steven, and Alan mistakenly shoots Fergus dead while chasing Edmond. Joan arrives and makes a narrow escape with Edmond and Ethan, during which Edmond is shot. He loses consciousness and his car veers off the road. Joan and Ethan exit and hide behind a tree until Roy finds them and takes them to safety.

Some time later, Joan, Edmond and Ethan are enjoying recreation together when Inspector Roy interrupts. Edmond bids Ethan farewell, promising he'll eventually return to stay. Edmond is driven off in Roy's custody, the outdoor outing a courtesy. Roy announces the kidnapping network has been dismantled with many arrests pending. He assures Edmond the judge will likely take his circumstances into account.

== Cast ==
- James McAvoy as Edmond Murray
- Claire Foy as Joan Richmond
- Tom Cullen as Frank Gilchrist
- Gary Lewis as Inspector Roy
- Michael Moreland as William O'Connor
- Robert Jack as Alan
- Owen Whitelaw as Fergus
- Paul Rattray as Steven
- Max Wilson as Ethan Murray

In addition, Mark Barrett was specifically included in the main credits as the stand-in for Edmond, as compared to merely body double or stunt double for McAvoy.

== Production ==
It was announced in October 2020 that James McAvoy and Claire Foy had been cast to star in the film, which was written and directed by Christian Carion, remaking his 2017 French film of the same name. McAvoy explained during an appearance on The Graham Norton Show that he was not supplied with a script or dialogue, and was made to improvise for himself.

Filming had begun by late October 2020, and filmed throughout Scotland. Filming in Lochaber paused after a positive COVID-19 test.

== Release ==
The film had a joint release between two streaming services; with Peacock on September 15, 2021 and The Roku Channel on December 15, 2021.

== Reception ==
The film received a mixed to negative reception from critics, with criticism towards the thin plot as a result of the improvisational nature. It has a score of 38% on Rotten Tomatoes.
