= Three Salons at the Seaside =

1994 British documentary

- Directed by: Philippa Lowthorpe
- Produced by: Philippa Lowthorpe
- Cinematography: Graham Smith
- Edited by: Fred Hart
- Music by: Peter Salem
- Production company: BBC Bristol
- Distributed by: BBC Worldwide
- Release date: 29 August 1994 (UK)
- Country: United Kingdom
- Language: English

Three Salons at the Seaside is a 1994 British documentary film directed by Philippa Lowthorpe. First broadcast on 29 August 1994 on BBC Two to mark the centenary of Blackpool Tower, the film follows the staff and customers of three hair salons operating in Blackpool, England. Three Salons at the Seaside received renewed attention after it was added to BBC iPlayer in 2022.

== Synopsis ==
Three Salons at the Seaside follows the staff and customers of Vanity Box, Mary's Way, and Tricia's, three hair salons operating in residential areas of Blackpool. While Blackpool is a seaside town known for its beach and resorts, the film focuses on elderly women living in the town going about their daily lives, centred around their visits to the salons.

== Production ==
The film was filmed in early 1994 in Blackpool, Lancashire. Lowthorpe stated that she was inspired to make Three Salons at the Seaside to show "a world of women talking that you don't otherwise see". She said the women reminded her of her own female working class relatives in neighbouring Yorkshire.

== Broadcast and reception ==
Three Salons at the Seaside first aired on 29 August 1994 on BBC Two as part of a special night of programming to mark the centenary of Blackpool Tower, alongside the film Dream Town. The film received a positive reception, and in 1995 it was nominated for Best Single Documentary at the RTS Television Awards.

In 2015, a rip of a tape recording of the film was uploaded onto YouTube. The film received renewed attention in 2022, when it was added to BBC iPlayer. Tribune described Three Salons at the Seaside as being a "camp classic" and compared it to the work of Victoria Wood.

== Legacy ==
In 2022, an episode of the American mockumentary series Documentary Now!, entitled "Two Hairdressers in Bagglyport", was based on Three Salons at the Seaside. The episode was written by Seth Meyers and starred Cate Blanchett and Harriet Walter; the fictional salon Salon de Edwina was filmed at the site of Mary's Way, which was featured in the original documentary and had closed in 2011.

In 2023, Craig Cash called Three Salons at the Seaside a key influence on Caroline Aherne, his co-writer and co-creator of the comedy series The Royle Family, citing its focus on characters and dialogue.
