= Alisdair Macdonald =

Photojournalist

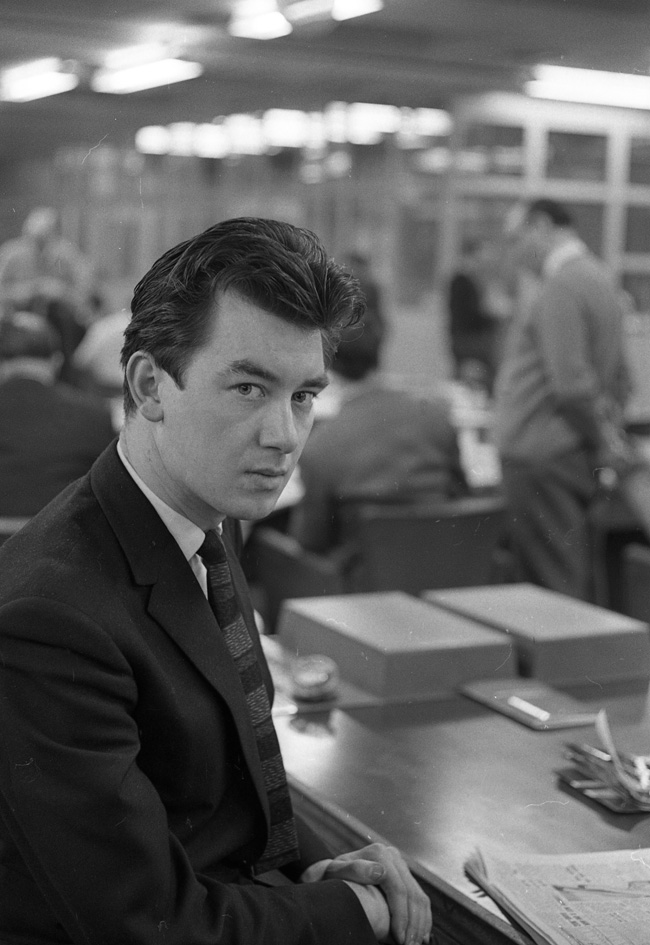
Alisdair Macdonald at the Daily Mirror offices, 1962

Alisdair Macdonald (1940–2007) was a British press photographer who worked for 26 years with the Daily Mirror. He took a seven-year break to help launch the first full-colour national newspaper Today.

In 1963 Macdonald travelled with the Beatles to Paris to document their shows at the Olympia. He would regularly photograph the band, up to and beyond their break up in 1970.

In 1989 he won first place in the Humour category of the World Press Photo contest for his photograph of a workman leaving the scene of a burst water main.

== Legacy ==
After his death, his child Helen Macdonald adopted a goshawk to help cope with their grief and subsequently wrote H is for Hawk about their experiences.

He was portrayed by Brendan Gleeson in the 2025 film H Is for Hawk.
