= H Is for Hawk (film) =

British drama film

- US theatrical release poster
- Directed by: Philippa Lowthorpe
- Written by: Emma Donoghue; Philippa Lowthorpe
- Based on: H is for Hawk by Helen MacDonald
- Produced by: Dede Gardner; Jeremy Kleiner
- Starring: Claire Foy; Brendan Gleeson; Denise Gough; Sam Spruell; Lindsay Duncan
- Cinematography: Charlotte Bruus Christensen
- Edited by: Nico Leunen
- Music by: Emilie Levienaise-Farrouch
- Production companies: Film4; Saturnia; Plan B Entertainment
- Distributed by: Lionsgate (United Kingdom); Roadside Attractions (United States)
- Release dates: 29 August 2025 (Telluride); 27 November 2025 (United States)
- Running time: 115 minutes (Note: The original cut has a runtime of 128 minutes (US) and 130 minutes (UK). The cut version runs for 115 minutes, although some list that cut as 119 minutes.)
- Countries: United Kingdom; United States
- Language: English
- Box office: $3 million

H Is for Hawk is a 2025 biographical drama film directed by Philippa Lowthorpe, who co-wrote the screenplay with Emma Donoghue, based on the 2014 memoir by naturalist Helen Macdonald. It stars Claire Foy, Brendan Gleeson, Denise Gough, Sam Spruell, and Lindsay Duncan. The film tells the true story of Helen Macdonald who tends to a goshawk after the death of their father Alisdair. The film received generally positive reviews from critics.

== Plot ==
H Is for Hawk chronicles Helen Macdonald’s experience of grief following the sudden death of her father and her decision to train a goshawk as a means of coping with that loss. The narrative interweaves two strands: Macdonald’s personal bereavement and the practical and psychological challenges of falconry.

After her father’s death, Macdonald retreats from her previous academic and social life and immerses in the demanding discipline of hawk training. She acquires a female goshawk, named Mabel, and devotes herself to the meticulous routines required to tame and hunt with the bird. The process is portrayed as both physically exhausting and emotionally consuming, drawing Macdonald into an intense, solitary relationship with the hawk and the wild instincts it embodies.

As Macdonald becomes increasingly absorbed in falconry, she describes a gradual withdrawal from ordinary human concerns, seeking refuge in the clarity and harshness of the natural world. This immersion brings moments of exhilaration and communion with nature, but also exposes the limits and dangers of attempting to escape grief by erasing one’s humanity.

While the book the movie is based on discusses Macdonald’s slow re-engagement with the human world, the film itself ends while she is still in a half-wild state. The director Phillipa Lowthorpe shows Macdonald up to the point at which she is going through a subtle shift where she stops trying to be a hawk and begins to inhabit her own skin again, even if she remains solitary still. The film focuses on the bruising realism of a person who has been changed by grief and nature, rather than a Hollywood-style return to normality.

== Cast ==
- Claire Foy as Helen Macdonald
- Brendan Gleeson as Alisdair Macdonald, Helen's father
- Sam Spruell as Stuart
- Josh Dylan as James
- Denise Gough as Christina
- Emma Cunniffe as Mandy
- Arty Froushan as Amar
- Lindsay Duncan as Helen's mother

== Production ==
The film was announced in February 2024, directed by Philippa Lowthorpe and written by Emma Donoghue. Based on H is for Hawk, the 2014 memoir by Helen Macdonald, it stars Claire Foy and Brendan Gleeson and has been developed with Film4, who executive produced and co-financed. The film was also produced by Plan B Entertainment, which had been attached to an adaptation of the book with Lena Headey in 2017. In November 2024, Lionsgate acquired UK and Irish distribution rights to the film from Protagonist Pictures.

Filming began in Cambridge in November 2024. Filming also took place in Wales and London.

The goshawks that play Mabel were trained and handled by the bird specialists Lloyd and Rose Buck, whom Lowthorpe approached because they worked near her home in Bristol. Five birds were used for the role: two sisters raised and trained by the couple took the bulk of the work, a third was loaned by a falconry centre in Scotland for the calmest scenes, a smaller male was used for high aerial shots, and a fifth appeared in the hunting sequences. Foy spent two weeks in intensive falconry training with the Bucks before filming began. Production was scheduled between October and January to avoid the birds' moulting season, the crew wore dark clothing to keep the hawks calm, microphones were concealed because the birds disliked boom poles, and most of the crew worked out of sight while a bird was on set.

In October 2025, Roadside Attractions acquired the North American distribution rights.

== Release ==
The film had its premiere at the 52nd Telluride Film Festival. The film also screened at the London Film Festival. It was released in the United States by Roadside Attractions in November 2025 for a one-week "awards-qualifying run," which was followed by a wide release on 23 January 2026. Lionsgate also released the film in the United Kingdom on 23 January.

== Reception ==
=== Critical response ===
On the review aggregator website Rotten Tomatoes, 82% of 104 critics' reviews are positive, with an average rating of 6.6/10. The website's consensus reads: "Pairing Claire Foy's psychologically raw performance with lush, evocative imagery, H Is for Hawk approaches its tale of grief and acceptance with bruising realism and thoughtful candor." Metacritic, which uses a weighted average, assigned the film a score of 63 out of 100, based on 24 critics, indicating "generally favorable" reviews.

=== Accolades ===
Award	Date of ceremony	Category	Recipient(s)	Result	Ref.
Zurich Film Festival	September 29, 2025	Golden Eye Award	Claire Foy	Won	
British Independent Film Awards	November 30, 2025	Best Cinematography	Charlotte Bruus Christensen	Nominated	
British Academy Film Awards	February 22, 2026	Outstanding British Film	Philippa Lowthorpe, Dede Gardner, Jeremy Kleiner, and Emma Donoghue	Nominated	
