= Tekels Park =

Park in Surrey, England

Coordinates: 51.33°N 0.734°W

Tekels Park, Camberley, Surrey consists of about 20 hectares (50 acres) of land, grassland and houses.

== History ==
The estate of Frimley Manor was sold by Henry Tichborne to James Lawrell the elder for £20,000 in 1789. (Note: James Lawrell's name is also spelt "James Laurell" in some sources.) In 1806 the estate was divided. James Lawrell the younger kept what was referred to as Frimley Manor, while Frimley Park mansion and 590 hectares (1,500 acres) of land were sold to John Tekells. John Tekells built a house on the site now known as Tekels Castle.

In 1860 Captain Knight and Major Spring bought Frimley Park. They sold Frimley Park mansion with 56 hectares (140 acres) of land to William Crompton Stansfield in 1862. They divided the remnant of the estate between themselves and each built a house. Captain Knight built a new house on virtually the same site as Tekell's previous house. The land on which Captain Knight built Tekels Castle was sold off gradually to meet the demands of new properties to support the new Army Staff College.

By 1870 Tekels Park Estate was reduced to 135 hectares (333 acres) of land and was purchased by Major-General Thomas Edmond Byrne (1830–1898). He continued the process of division and when the estate was sold in 1902, to Mr. A. Wilson-Hughes, it was a fraction of its former size. In 1906 the main house burnt down, but the ancillary buildings such as the coach houses and coachman's house and stables survived. In the aftermath of the fire the property remained vacant until 1929 when the members of the Theosophical Society purchased the 34 hectares (85 acres) estate on behalf of the Society. In 1961 the members sold the estate to Tekels Park Estate Ltd. When some of the land was compulsorily purchased by the Government in 1964 as part of the M3 motorway, the society chose to sell the land cut off by the motorway from the main establishment, reducing the property to 20 hectares (50 acres), but allowing the Society to build a guest house and make other improvements to the site.
