= Bumblefoot (infection) =

Bacterial foot disease of birds, rodents, and rabbits

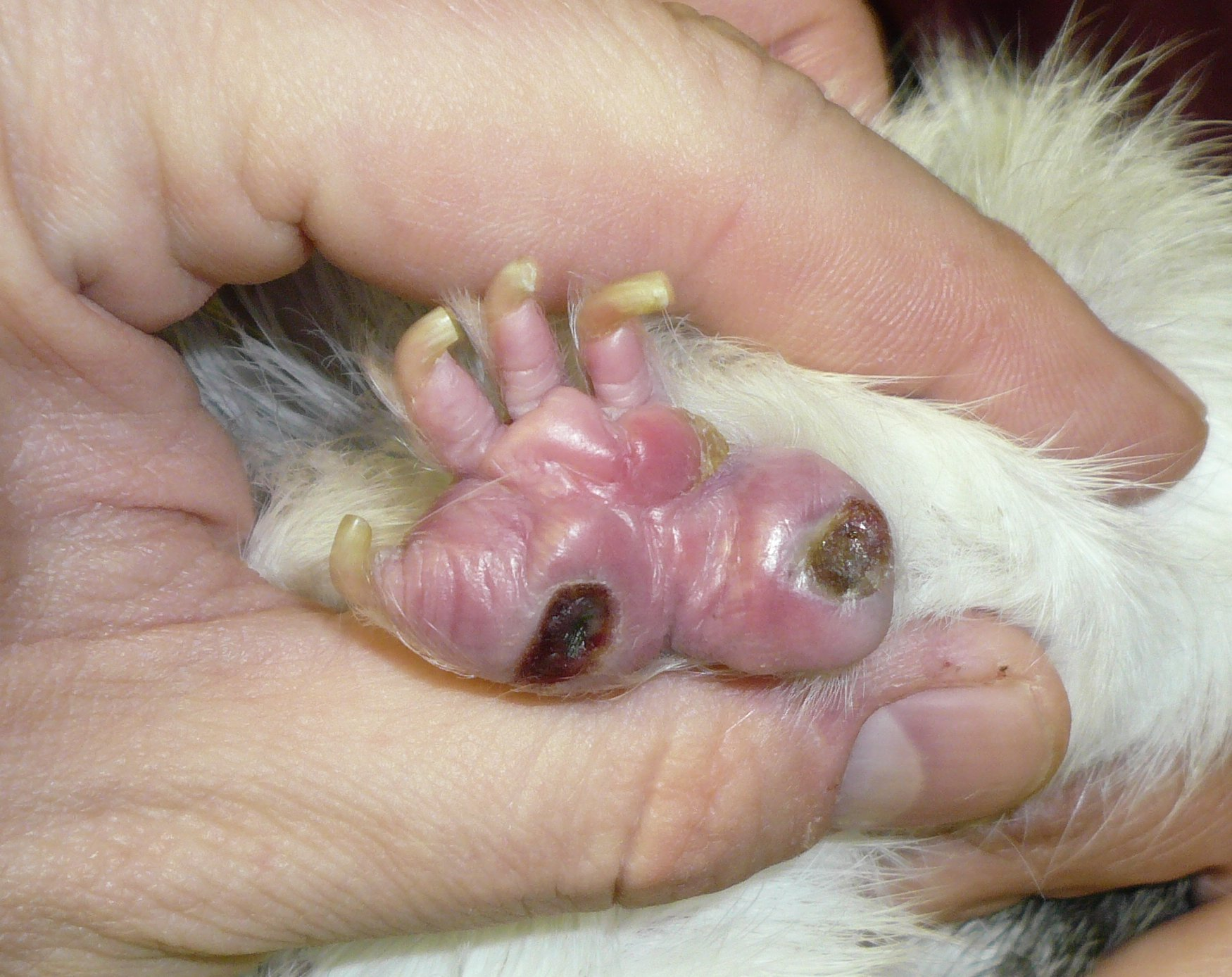
Bumblefoot lesions in a guinea pig

Bumblefoot (ulcerative pododermatitis) is a common bacterial infection and inflammatory reaction that occurs on the feet of birds, rodents, and rabbits. It is caused by bacteria, namely species of Staphylococcus, Pseudomonas, and Escherichia, with S. aureus being the most common cause of the infection. The aforementioned opportunistic bacteria occur naturally in the animal's environment, and infection occurs when one or a combination of these enters the body through a scrape or cut in the skin.

Bumblefoot can take various forms, but it usually looks like an abscess-like swelling with a central, dark-colored scab that may or may not ooze. Sometimes, this swollen bump contains pus or cottage cheese-like material. Alternately, the swelling could contain a hard lump when these materials harden, or if the abscess becomes impacted with substrate (e.g. soil, straw, etc.). Bumblefoot may also present as redness, swelling, small red sores, and depending upon severity and length of time with the condition, lesions, cracks, or discoloration.

Lameness puts more weight-bearing duty on an animal's strong leg(s); this leads to excessive pressure being placed on the good foot (or feet), which increases the chance of an abrasion occurring that could develop a bumblefoot infection. Consequently, in cases of lameness, the good leg(s) should be examined for potential cuts and infections. Overweight animals are more at risk of developing bumblefoot for the same reason; their extra weight causes excessive pressure on their feet. However, the infection can usually be attributed to poor husbandry practices, so is much more likely to occur in captive animals than in those in the wild. Ulcerative pododermatitis is referred to as "sore hocks" when it affects a rabbit and "bumblefoot" when it affects a bird. The terms "sore hocks" and "bumblefoot" are used interchangeably when describing ulcerative pododermatitis in rodents.

== Bumblefoot on birds of prey ==
Bumblefoot is, perhaps, the largest cause of referral of birds of prey to a veterinary surgeon. Bumblefoot on birds of prey can be put into three broad types of the infection. In the first type, a small, reddened area, or sometimes a small, shiny patch, can be seen on the foot. This is mostly caused by inappropriate perching (or perching for too long), or less likely, by badly fitted furniture, such as jesses, that are too small. The second type is more serious, where an infection has penetrated the skin. The third type involves the bird having a severe distortion of the contours of the foot and/or the toes, resulting in considerable damage to the foot. A bird suspected of suffering from any degree of bumblefoot should be assessed by an avian veterinarian and prescribed antibiotics if deemed necessary.

== Bumblefoot in poultry and waterfowl ==
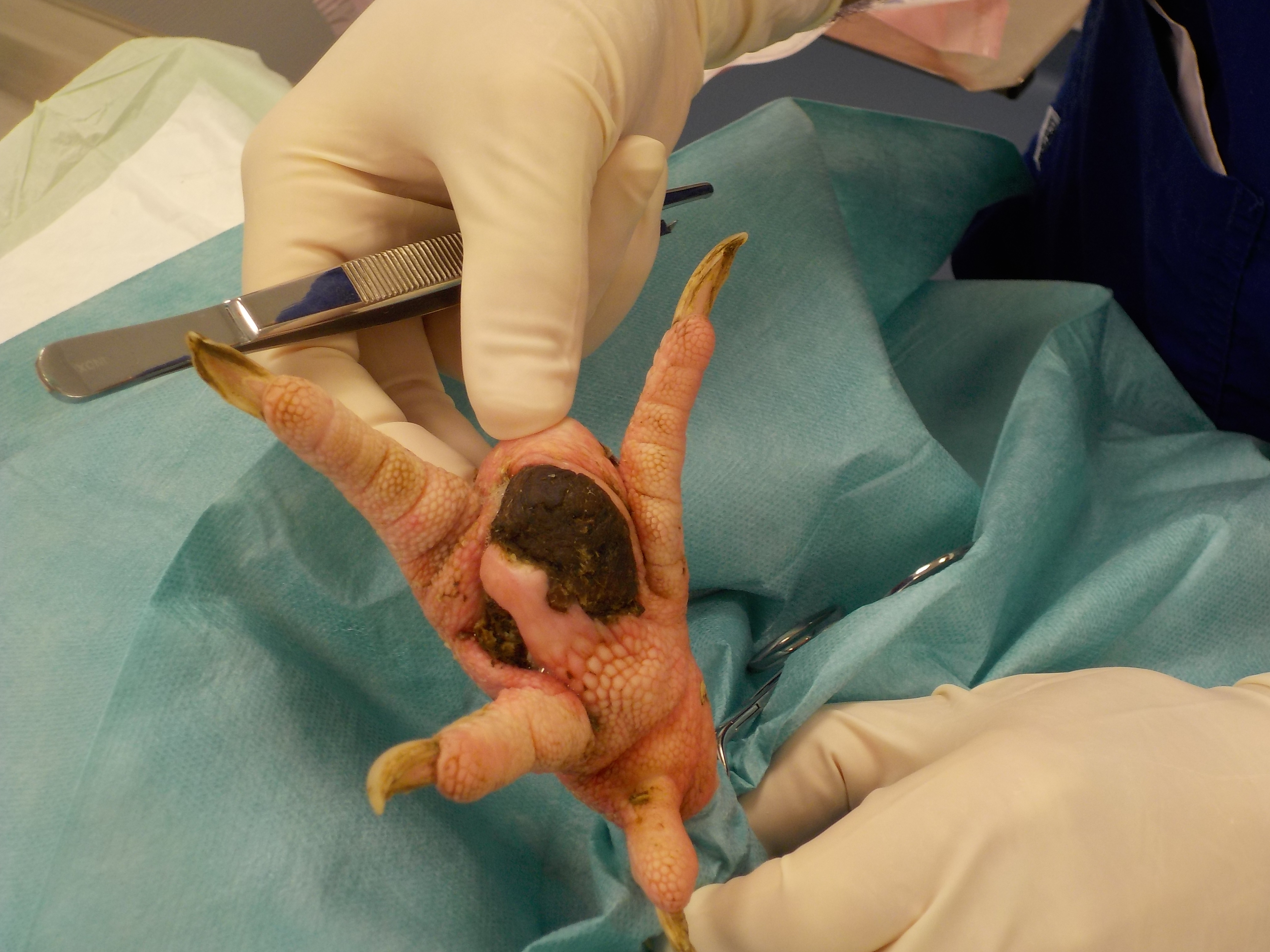
Pododermatitis in an anesthesized rooster, immediately prior to surgery

Bumblefoot is a common infection for domesticated poultry and waterfowl, such as chickens, ducks, and quail. Due to constant walking on hard, rough, or sharp surfaces, birds can develop small wounds on the bottom of their feet. These wounds are very susceptible to infection by opportunistic bacterial pathogens, chiefly Staphylococcus aureus. Treatment often requires opening the wound to drain the pus, soaking it in Epsom salts, and antibiotic treatment and local application of the antiseptic povidone-iodine as local dressing.

== Bumblefoot in penguins ==
In 2016, thermography was used to identify and evaluate bumblefoot lesions in 67 captive penguins from three species.

== Etymology ==
Bumblefoot is so named because of the characteristic "bumbles" or lesions, as well as swelling of the foot pad, symptomatic of an infection. Topical antiseptics in addition to oral or injected antibiotics may be used to combat the infection, which if left untreated may be fatal.
