= Philippa Lowthorpe =

English film and television director

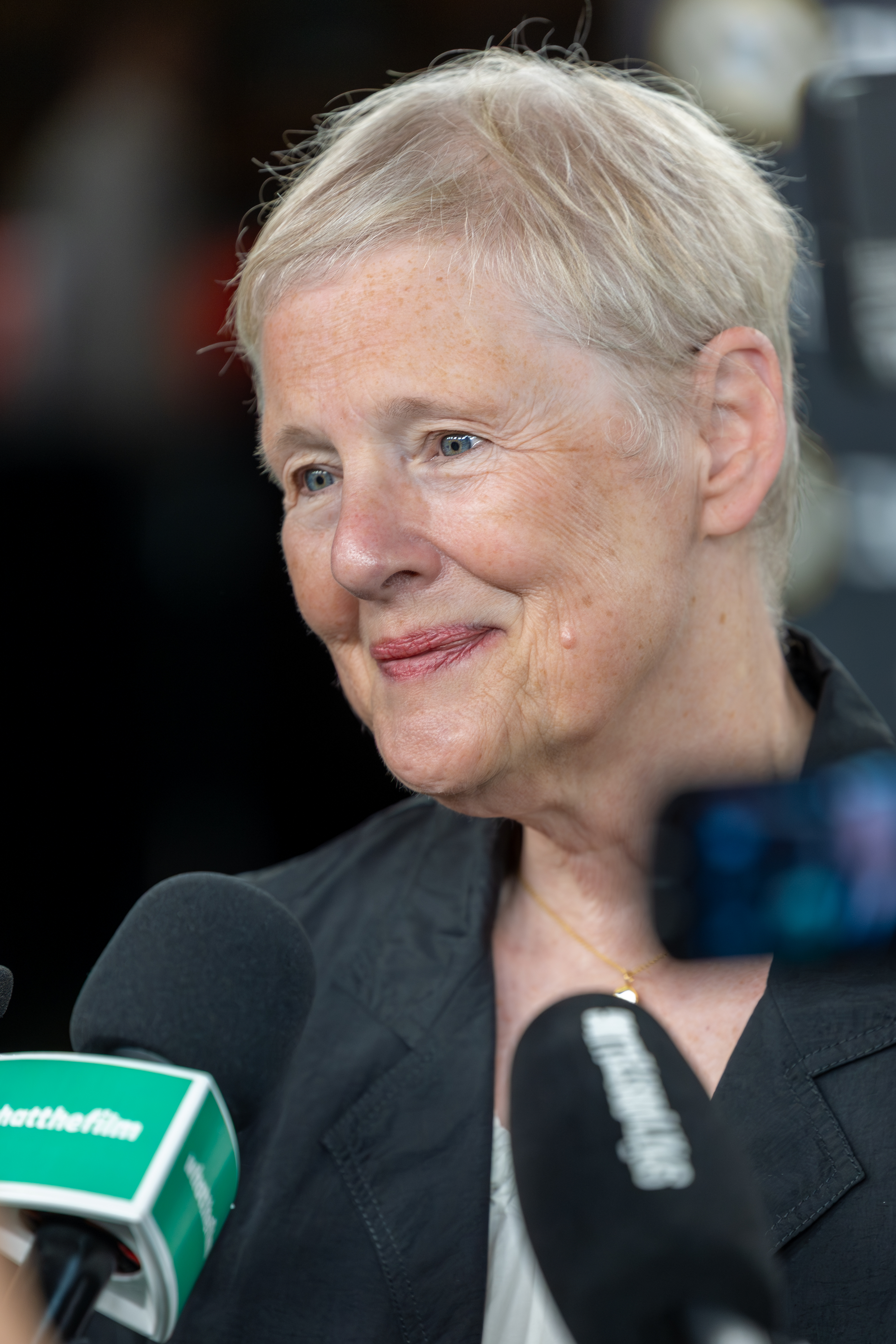
- Philippa Lowthorpe on the Green Carpet at the 2025 Zurich Film Festival.
- Born: Doncaster, West Riding of Yorkshire, England
- Education: St. Hilda's College, Oxford
- Occupations: Film director; screenwriter
- Years active: 1992–present

Philippa Lowthorpe is an English film and television director. She was awarded the Deluxe Director Award at the WFTV Film and Television Awards for the miniseriesThree Girls. She recently directed episodes of the second season of The Crown and the 2020 film Misbehaviour.

== Early life and education ==
Philippa Lowthorpe was born in a village near Doncaster, then in the West Riding of Yorkshire, England, and grew up in Nettleham, Lincolnshire.

She attended De Aston School in Market Rasen and then went to St Hilda's College, Oxford to study classics.

== Career ==
Lowthorpe moved to Bristol to make documentaries for BBC Bristol, including Three Salons at the Seaside and A Skirt Through History, about women's untold stories.

Her award-winning documentaries led her to be invited to write and direct her first drama, Eight Hours from Paris (1997) for George Faber, a film for Screen Two in which real people played themselves, alongside professional actors. This was followed by The Other Boleyn Girl (2003), adapted from the 2001 novel of the same name by Philippa Gregory, for BBC films, shown on BBC 2. In 2006 she directed Beau Brummell: This Charming Man (2006).

She was lead director on the very first series of Call the Midwife. She also directed the first Call the Midwife Christmas Special (2013), for which she won a British Academy Television Craft Award in 2013. A 2013 interview with her appears on the BAFTA website. She also received a British Film Institute award in 2013. She directed Jamaica Inn in 2014.

Her first feature film, Swallows and Amazons (2016), won Grand Prize Feature at New York International Children's Film Festival, and the Youth Jury Award for Best Films4Families Feature at Seattle International Film Festival in 2017.

The BBC mini-series Three Girls (2017), about the Rochdale young child exploitation, reunited her with executive producer Susan Hogg and producer Simon Lewis, with whom she had previously worked on Five Daughters. The series was awarded by BAFTA for best directing in fiction, with writer Nicole Taylor recognised for best writing in a drama series, and Úna Ní Dhonghaíle for best editing in fiction, in 2018. In May 2018 Three Girls was voted Best Mini Series at the BAFTA TV Awards (shared with Nicole Taylor, Susan Hogg, and Simon Lewis). In October 2018 Three Girls a won the Prix Italia (again shared with Nicole Taylor, Susan Hogg and Simon Lewis).

In 2025 Lowthorpe directed the factual drama miniseries based on the imprisonment of a British national in Iran, Prisoner 951.

== Filmography ==
=== Television ===
Documentary series

Year	Title	Director	Writer	Producer	Notes
1992	BBC 40 Minutes	No	No	Yes	Episode "Not at Their Age"
1994	A Skirt Through History	Yes	Yes	Yes	Episodes "The Experiment" and "A Marriage"

TV movies

Year	Title	Director	Writer	Producer
1992	Enniskillen: Splendid Hearts	Yes	No	Yes
1995	Remember the Family	Yes	No	No
1997	Eight Hours from Paris	Yes	Yes	Yes
2000	A Childhood	Yes	No	Yes
2003	The Other Boleyn Girl	Yes	Yes	No
2006	Beau Brummell: This Charming Man	Yes	No	No
2007	Sex, the City and Me	Yes	Yes	No
2015	Cider with Rosie	Yes	No	No

Miniseries

Year	Title	Director	Executive Producer	Notes
2010	Five Daughters	Yes	No	
2014	Jamaica Inn	Yes	No	
2017	Three Girls	Yes	No	
2020	The Third Day	Yes	Yes	3 episodes
2025	Prisoner 951	Yes	Yes	

TV series

Year	Title	Notes
2013-2014	Call the Midwife	5 episodes
2017	The Crown	Episodes "Marionettes" and "Vergangenheit"
2022	Willow	Episodes "Wildwood" and "Prisoners of Skellin"

=== Film ===
Documentary film

- Three Salons at the Seaside (1994) (Also producer)

Short film

- The Spy Who Caught A Cold (1994)
- The Gorals Do Bristol (1999)

Feature film

- Swallows and Amazons (2016)
- Misbehaviour (2020)
- H Is for Hawk (2025) (Also writer)

== Awards and nominations ==
Year	Association	Category	Work	Result	Ref.
1995	RTS Programme Awards	Best Single Documentary	Three Salons at the Seaside	Won	
2011	RTS Programme Awards - West of England	Best Television Drama	Five Daughters	Nominated ^{[4a]}	
2011	RTS Programme Awards - West of England	Best Director	Five Daughters	Won	
2011	RTS Programme Awards	Best Drama Serial	Five Daughters	Won ^{[4a]}	
2013	British Academy Television Craft Awards	Best Director - Fiction / Entertainment	Call the Midwife	Won	
2013	British Academy Television Awards	Radio Times Audience Award	Call the Midwife	Nominated ^{[1a]}	
2013	Television and Radio Industries Club Awards	HD Drama Programme of the Year	Call the Midwife	Won ^{[1a]}	
2013	Christopher Award	Television & Cable	Call the Midwife	Won ^{[1b]}	
2013	RTS Programme Awards - West of England	Best Director Drama	Call the Midwife	Won	
2013	RTS Programme Awards	Best Drama Series	Call the Midwife	Nominated ^{[1a]}	
2017	Seattle International Film Festival	Youth Jury Award for Best Films4Families Feature	Swallows and Amazons	Won ^{[3a]}	
2017	RTS Programme Awards - West of England	Best Director, Drama	Swallows and Amazons	Nominated	
2017	New York International Children's Film Festival	Grand Prize Feature	Swallows and Amazons	Won ^{[3a]}	
2017	WFTV Awards	The Deluxe Director Award	Herself	Won	
2017	Festival de la Fiction TV Awards	Jury Special Prize for European Fiction	Three Girls	Won ^{[2a]}	
2018	British Academy Television Craft Awards	Best Director: Fiction	Three Girls	Won	
2018	British Academy Television Awards	Best Mini-Series	Three Girls	Nominated ^{[2a]}	
2018	Broadcasting Press Guild Awards	Best Single Drama/Mini-series	Three Girls	Won ^{[2a]}	
2018	UK Broadcast Awards	Best Drama Series or Serial	Three Girls	Won ^{[2a]}	
2018	RTS Programme Awards - West of England	Best Television Drama	Three Girls	Won ^{[2a]}	
2018	RTS Programme Awards - West of England	Best Director Drama	Three Girls	Won	
2018	RTS Programme Awards	Best Mini-Series	Three Girls	Won ^{[2a]}	

Notes
1. ^{1a} Call the Midwife — with Heidi Thomas (writer), Hugh Warren (producer), and Pippa Harris (executive producer)
... ^{1b} — with Heidi Thomas (writer) and Pippa Harris (executive producer)
2. ^{2a} Three Girls — with Nicole Taylor (writer), Simon Lewis (producer), and Susan Hogg (executive producer)
3. ^{3a} Swallows and Amazons — with Andrea Gibb
4. ^{4a} Five Daughters — with Stephen Butchard and Simon Lewis

== Honours ==
- Honorary Degree of Doctor of Arts in recognition of Lowthorpe's contribution to film and television, UWE Bristol.
