= Jess (falconry) =

Thin strap that tethers a bird

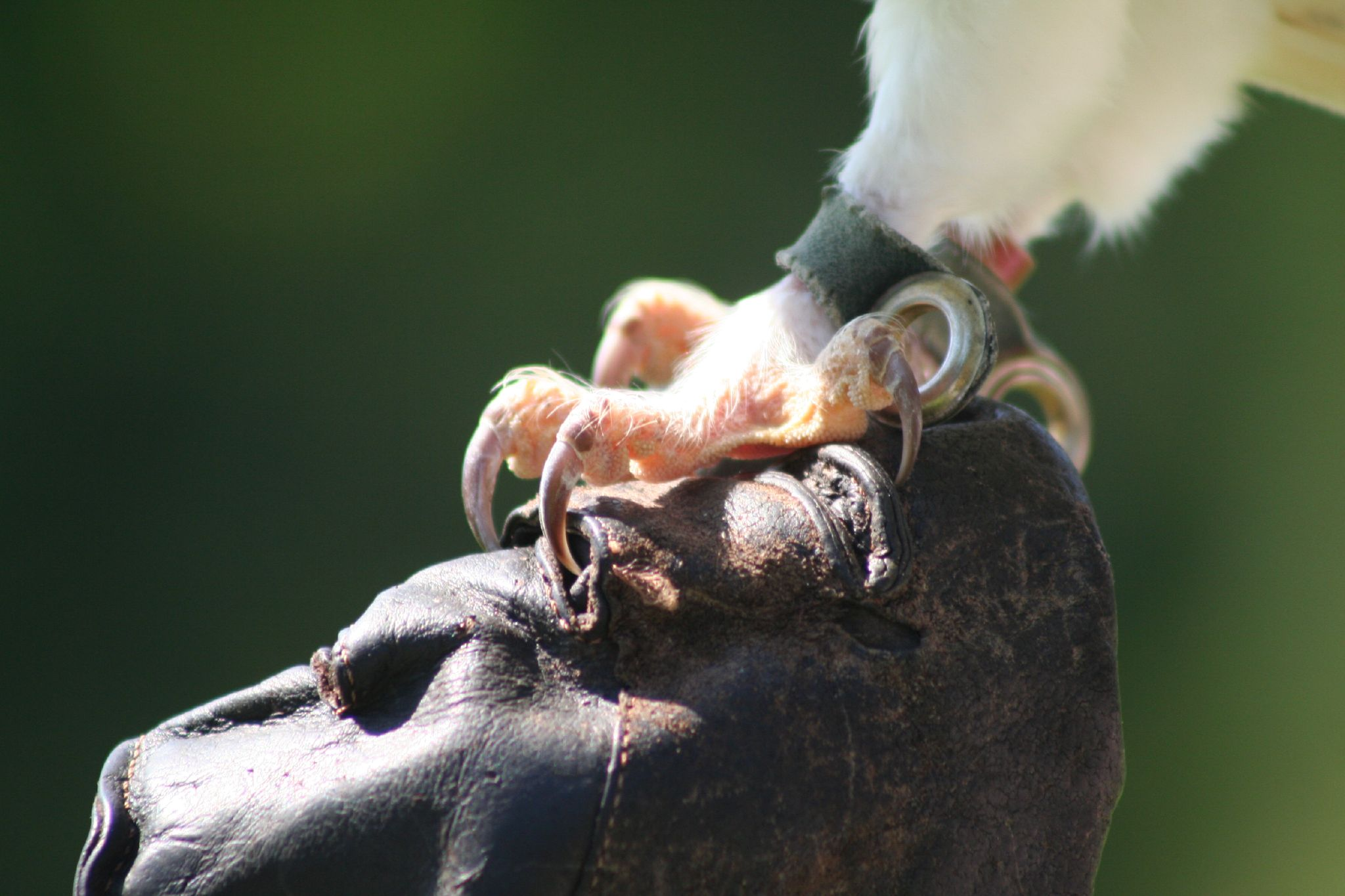
Aylmeri anklet with grommet on barn owl

A jess is a thin strap, traditionally made of leather, that is used in falconry to tether a trained hawk, falcon, or owl. Jesses allow a falconer to keep control of a bird while it is on the glove or in training, and allow a bird to be secured on a perch outside its aviary.

== Types ==
Jesses come in various types:

- Flying/Hunting jesses: short jesses without the swivel slit so as to not hamper the hawk as it flies or to snag on things as it moves from perch to perch—mainly to help control the bird while on the glove in the field. Flying jesses are often even smaller and lighter than hunting jesses, and are permanently attached to their anklets so they will not be lost; both types may have the swivel slit on them, based on the falconer's preference, but most often do not.
- Mews jesses: long jesses that the hawk wears while it is in a mews or an aviary.
- Traditional and Aylmeri: See below.

== Description ==
Jesses are generally made from strips of leather as thin as possible, for which purpose kangaroo leather has become increasingly popular over the years, as it is thin, light-weight and extremely durable with proper care. Jess size varies depending on the bird, but the width is proportional to leg-length. Traditional jesses are made from a single length of leather, and slits are placed strategically along the jess to allow it to be looped through itself and around the ankle of the bird so that it fits comfortably but securely about and just above what would be the bird's ankle. With Aylmeri jesses, as created by Major Guy Aylmeri, the end of the jess is instead looped through itself repeatedly to form a "button", or knob at one end. The thin, pliable end of the jess is then threaded through an anklet worn by the bird, which is itself formed of another rectangular strip of leather, bound together at the ends by a grommet (usually of brass), prevented from slipping through the grommet by the knobbed end. Often, another slit is placed near the thin end of the jess cut about one inch long and running lengthwise, through which a special type of swivel is fitted, preventing the whole arrangement from twisting or tangling about itself or the bird when a leash is threaded through the other end.

During hunting season (small game season for North American falconers), jesses are generally worn all season in the mews, and are often removed for the course of the spring/summer moult, when they are generally re-oiled and serviced as necessary.
