= Claire Foy =

British actress (born 1984)

- Foy in 2026
- Born: 16 April 1984 (age 42); Stockport, Greater Manchester, England
- Occupation: Actress
- Years active: 2008–present
- Spouse: Stephen Campbell Moore (m. 2014; sep. 2018)
- Children: 1
- Awards: Full list

Claire Elizabeth Foy (born 16 April 1984) is a British actress. She is best known for her portrayal of Queen Elizabeth II in the Netflix series The Crown (2016–2017, 2020, 2022–2023), for which she received various accolades such as a Golden Globe and two Primetime Emmy Awards.

Foy made her screen debut in the pilot episode of the supernatural comedy series Being Human (2008). Following her professional stage debut at the Royal National Theatre, she played the title role in the BBC One miniseries Little Dorrit (2008) and made her film debut in the American fantasy drama Season of the Witch (2011). Following leading roles in the television series The Promise (2011) and Crossbones (2014), Foy earned praise for portraying the ill-fated queen Anne Boleyn in the BBC miniseries Wolf Hall (2015), receiving a BAFTA Nomination.

In 2018 she starred in Steven Soderbergh's psychological thriller Unsane and portrayed Janet Shearon, wife of astronaut Neil Armstrong, in Damien Chazelle's biopic First Man. For the latter, she received Best Supporting Actress nominations from the Golden Globes and the BAFTAs. She has since portrayed Margaret Campbell, Duchess of Argyll in the Amazon Prime series A Very British Scandal (2021), and starred in the drama films Women Talking (2022) and All of Us Strangers (2023). The last of these earned her another BAFTA nomination.

== Early life and education ==
Claire Elizabeth Foy was born on 16 April 1984 in Stockport, Greater Manchester, to David Foy and Caroline Stimpson. She has an older brother and an older sister. The family later moved to Longwick, Buckinghamshire, where her father worked as a salesman for Rank Xerox. Her parents separated when she was two and divorced when she was eight. Foy is of Irish descent.

Foy attended Aylesbury High School from 1996 to 2002, before studying drama and screen studies at Liverpool John Moores University, initially intending to become a cinematographer. She subsequently completed a one-year-course at the Oxford School of Drama, graduating in 2007. After leaving drama school, she moved to Peckham in south London, and shared a house with five classmates.

== Career ==
=== 2008–2015: Theatre work and Wolf Hall ===
While at the Oxford School of Drama, Foy appeared in the plays Top Girls, Watership Down, Easy Virtue, and Touched. After appearing in small roles on television, she made her professional stage debut in DNA (part of a triptych of plays including The Miracle and Baby Girl), directed by Paul Miller at the Royal National Theatre.

Foy's screen debut was as Julia Beckett in the pilot episode of the supernatural comedy series Being Human (2008). The role was recast for the remainder of the series. Foy starred as the title character Amy Dorrit in the 2008 BBC series Little Dorrit, for which she was nominated for an RTS Award. She went on to appear in the television serial Going Postal (2010), based on the novel by Terry Pratchett. Foy also starred in the 2010 BBC revival of Upstairs Downstairs as Lady Persephone, and co-starred in the Channel 4 serial The Promise, broadcast in February 2011. In 2011, she made her feature film debut opposite Nicolas Cage in the American fantasy adventure film Season of the Witch. The same year she appeared alongside Benedict Cumberbatch in the British drama film Wreckers.

Foy played one of the lead roles, Helen Giniver, in the 2010 television film adaptation of Sarah Waters's novel The Night Watch. Foy returned to the stage in February 2013 as Lady Macbeth, alongside James McAvoy in the title role, in Macbeth at the Trafalgar Studios. In 2015, Foy played the English queen Anne Boleyn in the six-part drama serial Wolf Hall. Her performance was met with critical praise and has been named as one of the best on-screen portrayals of Boleyn. Foy was subsequently nominated for the 2016 British Academy Television Award for Best Actress. She appears in the sequel series The Mirror and the Light via archive footage.

=== 2016–2019: The Crown and film roles ===
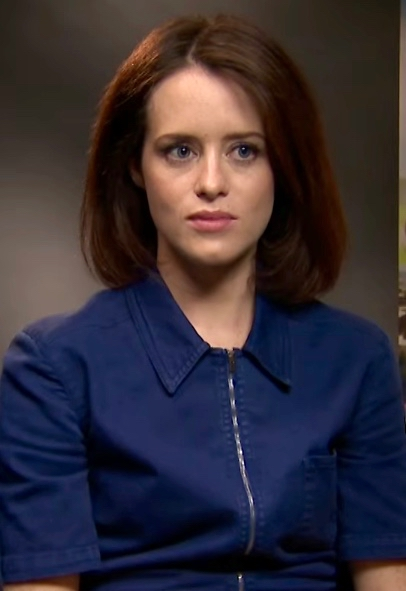
Foy in October 2017

In 2016, Foy portrayed Queen Elizabeth II in Peter Morgan's Netflix biographical drama series The Crown. Her performance earned her the Golden Globe Award for Best Actress – Television Series Drama, the Screen Actors Guild Award for Outstanding Performance by a Female Actor in a Drama Series twice, and the Primetime Emmy Award for Outstanding Lead Actress in a Drama Series. She was also nominated for the BAFTA TV Award for Best Actress. In 2017, she reprised the role in the second season, before the role passed to actress Olivia Colman, who from the third season portrayed the Queen in middle age.

In 2017 Foy starred as Diana Cavendish in the biographical drama film Breathe. In 2018, Foy starred in Steven Soderbergh's psychological thriller Unsane, portrayed the vigilante Lisbeth Salander in the action-thriller The Girl in the Spider's Web, and played Janet Shearon, wife of American astronaut Neil Armstrong, in Damien Chazelle's biopic First Man. For the latter, she was nominated for the Golden Globe Award for Best Supporting Actress – Motion Picture, the Critics' Choice Award for Best Supporting Actress, and the British Academy Film Award for Best Supporting Actress.

=== 2020–present ===
In 2020, Foy reprised the role of the young Queen Elizabeth II in the eighth episode of The Crown's fourth season. Her performance earned her the Primetime Emmy Award for Outstanding Guest Actress in a Drama Series. In 2021, Foy starred as Margaret Campbell, Duchess of Argyll in the BBC production A Very British Scandal. That year she played Emily Richardson-Wain, wife of artist Louis Wain, in The Electrical Life of Louis Wain. She also appeared in the film My Son, a remake of the 2017 French film Mon garçon.

Foy at the Zurich Film Festival in 2025

In October 2021, Foy was cast as Facebook executive Sheryl Sandberg in the drama series Doomsday Machine, based on the book Ugly Truth: Inside Facebook's Battle for Domination. Following a bidding war, the project landed at HBO for development in February 2022.

Foy played Salome, an American Mennonite living in an isolated colony, in the drama film Women Talking (2022), for which she won the Satellite Award for Best Actress in a Supporting Role. In November 2022, Foy reprised her role of the young Queen Elizabeth in the season five premiere of The Crown. Foy reprised the character again in the final episode of season six. Her performance earned her another nomination for the Primetime Emmy Award for Outstanding Guest Actress in a Drama Series. Foy also appeared in the 2023 drama film All of Us Strangers, for which she was nominated for another BAFTA for Best Supporting Actress.

Foy portrayed writer Helen Macdonald in the biographical drama film H Is for Hawk, which premiered at the 52nd Telluride Film Festival in August 2025. For the film, Foy was honoured by Zurich Film Festival with a Golden Eye Award in September 2025. She played Polly Thompson in The Magic Faraway Tree, a 2026 film adaptation of Enid Blyton's book series. Foy and Richard E. Grant led the black comedy period film Savage House, which released in June 2026.

In October 2025 Deadline announced that Foy was cast in Ink, an upcoming film adaptation of James Graham's 2017 play of the same name, directed by Danny Boyle. Ink premiered at the 83rd Venice International Film Festival on 2 September 2026.

In July 2026, The Hollywood Reporter announced that Foy and Matthew Macfadyen would star in an eight-part BBC and Starz television adaptation of David Nicholls' 2024 novel You Are Here.

== Personal life ==
Foy married actor Stephen Campbell Moore in 2014. They have one daughter. Foy and Moore announced their separation in February 2018.

In 2021, Foy was targeted by a stalker who sent her more than 1,000 emails in a single month and appeared at her home. The individual pleaded guilty in November 2022 and received a suspended sentence pending repatriation to the United States.

In February 2026, Foy disclosed that she had contracted stomach parasites during a trip to Morocco and had unknowingly lived with them for five years. She also stated that she has an autoimmune condition.

== Acting credits ==
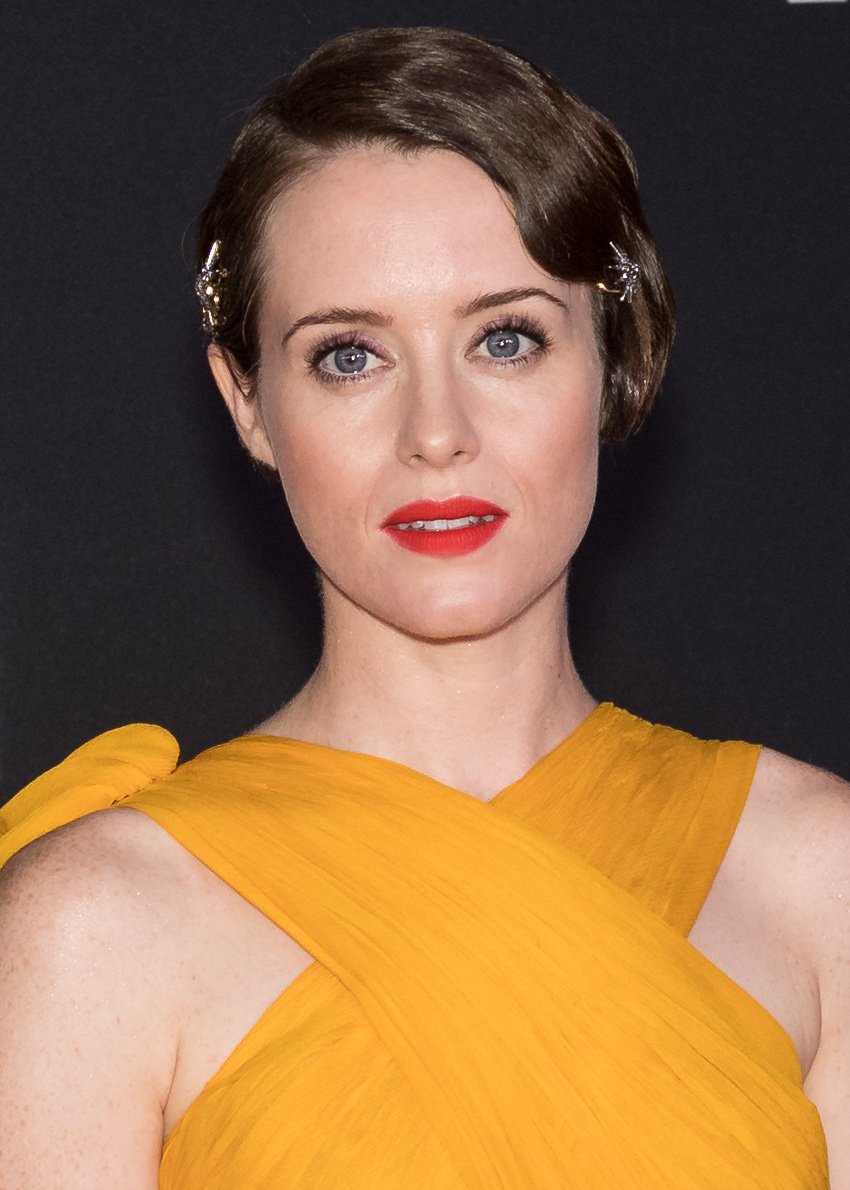
Foy at the Washington, D.C. premiere of First Man in 2018

Key
| † | Denotes films that have not yet been released |

=== Film ===
| Year | Title | Role | Notes | Ref. |
|---|---|---|---|---|
| 2011 | Season of the Witch | Anna | | |
| 2011 | Wreckers | Dawn | | |
| 2014 | Vampire Academy | Sonya Karp | | |
| 2014 | Rosewater | Paola Gourley | | |
| 2015 | The Lady in the Van | Lois | | |
| 2017 | Breathe | Diana Cavendish | | |
| 2018 | Unsane | Sawyer Valentini | | |
| 2018 | First Man | Janet Shearon-Armstrong | | |
| 2018 | The Girl in the Spider's Web | Lisbeth Salander | | |
| 2021 | The Electrical Life of Louis Wain | Emily Richardson-Wain | | |
| 2021 | My Son | Joan Richmond | | |
| 2022 | Women Talking | Salome | | |
| 2023 | All of Us Strangers | Adam's mother | | |
| 2025 | H Is for Hawk | Helen Macdonald | | |
| 2026 | The Magic Faraway Tree | Polly Thompson | | |
| 2026 | Savage House | Lady Savage | | |
| 2026 | Ink | Jules Davies | | |

=== Television ===
| Year | Title | Role | Notes | Ref. |
|---|---|---|---|---|
| 2008 | Being Human | Julia Beckett | Episode: "Pilot" | |
| 2008 | Doctors | Chloe Webster | Episode: "The Party's Over" | |
| 2008 | Little Dorrit | Amy Dorrit | | |
| 2009 | 10 Minute Tales | | Episode: "Through the Window" | |
| 2010 | Terry Pratchett's Going Postal | Adora Belle Dearheart | 2 episodes | |
| 2010 | Pulse | Hannah Carter | Television film | |
| 2010–2012 | Upstairs Downstairs | Lady Persephone Towyn | Main cast | |
| 2011 | The Promise | Erin Matthews | Main cast | |
| 2011 | The Night Watch | Helen Giniver | Television film | |
| 2012 | Hacks | Kate Loy | Television film | |
| 2012 | White Heat | Charlotte | Main cast | |
| 2014 | Crossbones | Kate Balfour | Main cast | |
| 2014 | The Great War: The People's Story | Helen Bentwich | | |
| 2014 | Frankenstein and the Vampyre: A Dark and Stormy Night | Narrator | Voice; Television film | |
| 2015 | Wolf Hall | Anne Boleyn | Main cast | |
| 2016–2017, 2020, 2022–2023 | The Crown | Queen Elizabeth II | Main cast (Seasons 1–2); Guest role (Seasons 4–6) | |
| 2018 | Saturday Night Live | Herself | Host; Episode: "Claire Foy/Anderson .Paak" | |
| 2021 | A Very British Scandal | Margaret Campbell, Duchess of Argyll | Main cast; Miniseries | |
| 2023 | Mog's Christmas | Mrs Thomas | Voice; Television special | |
| 2024 | Wolf Hall: The Mirror and the Light | Anne Boleyn | Episode: "Wreckage"; Archive footage | |
| TBA | Marlow † | Evie Wyatt | Main role | |
| TBA | You Are Here † | Marnie | Main role | |

=== Theatre ===
| Year | Title | Role | Playwright | Theatre | Ref. |
|---|---|---|---|---|---|
| 2008 | DNA | Jan | Dennis Kelly | National Theatre, London | |
| 2012 | Love, Love, Love | Rose | Mike Bartlett | Royal Court Theatre, London | |
| 2012 | Ding, Dong the Wicked | Young Woman | Caryl Churchill | Royal Court Theatre, London | |
| 2013 | Macbeth | Lady Macbeth | William Shakespeare | Trafalgar Studios, London | |
| 2019 | Lungs | W | Duncan Macmillan | The Old Vic, London | |
