= List of accolades received by Women Talking =

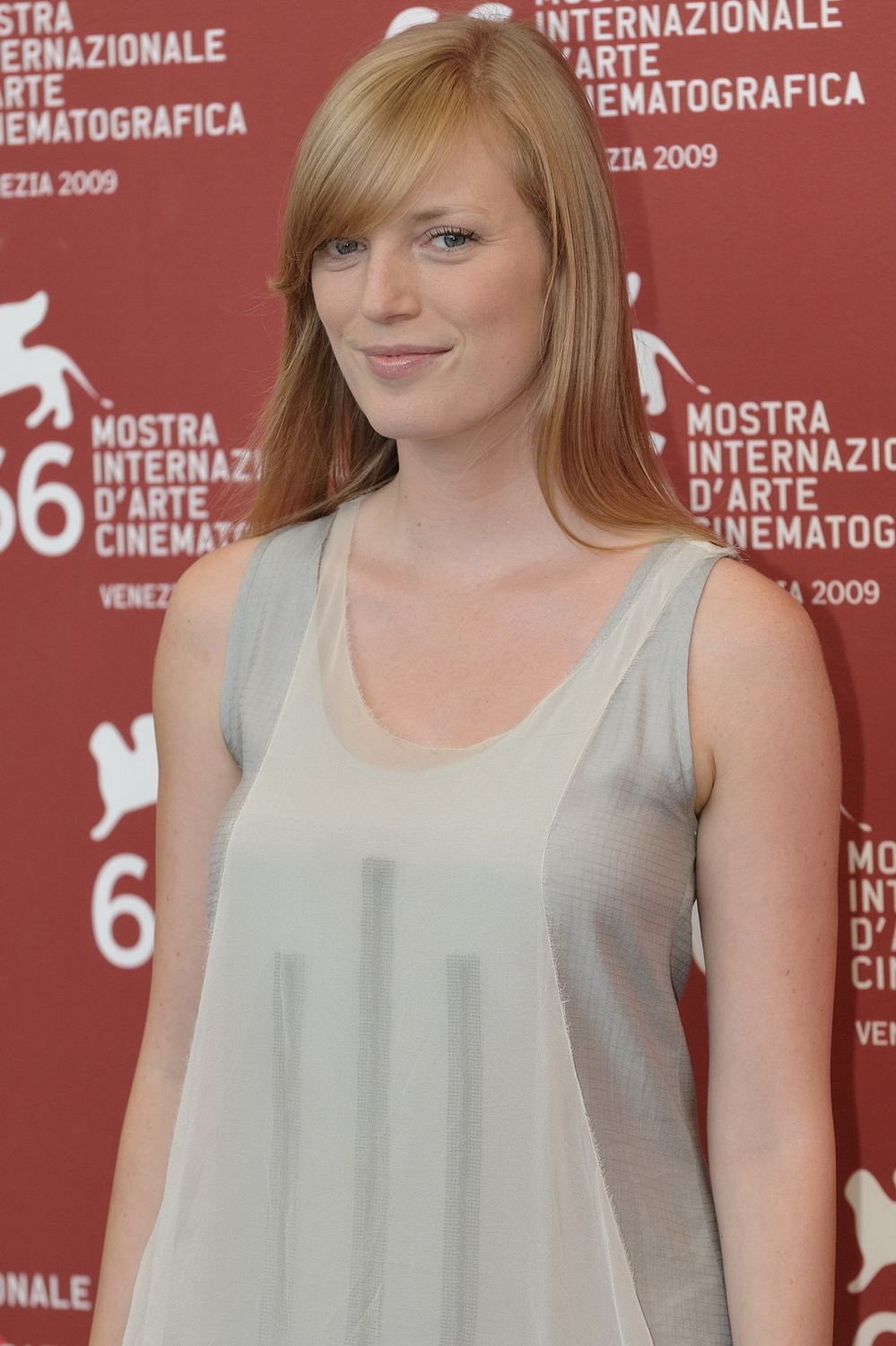
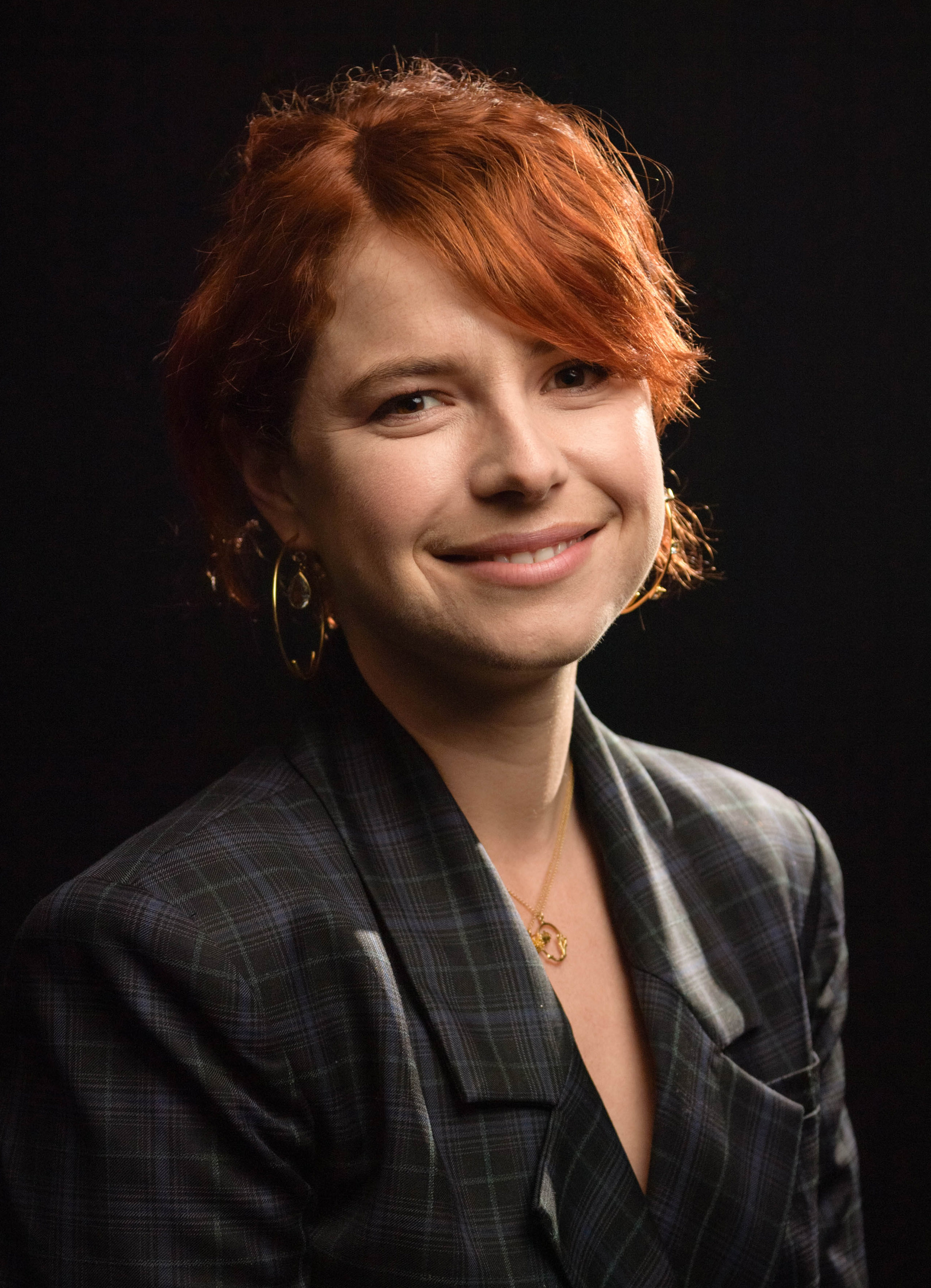
- Sarah Polley received acclaim for her screenplay and direction, as did Jessie Buckley for her performance.
Accolades
Award	Wins	Nominations
AACTA International Awards	0	2
AARP Movies for Grownups Awards	0	3
Academy Awards	1	2
Alliance of Women Film Journalists	0	9
American Film Institute Awards	1	1
Boston Society of Film Critics	1	1
Critics' Choice Movie Awards	1	7
Chicago Film Critics Association	1	5
Dallas–Fort Worth Film Critics Association	1	3
Florida Film Critics Circle	2	5
Georgia Film Critics Association	0	2
Golden Globe Awards	0	2
Hollywood Critics Association	0	5
Hollywood Music in Media Awards	1	1
Independent Spirit Awards	1	4
Mill Valley Film Festival	1	1
Palm Springs International Film Festival	1	1
San Francisco Bay Area Film Critics Circle	2	6
Satellite Awards	0	6
St. Louis Film Critics Association	3	8
Screen Actors Guild Awards	0	1
Toronto International Film Festival	0	1
Washington D.C. Area Film Critics Association	0	5
Windsor International Film Festival	1	1

Totals (Note: Certain award groups do not simply award one winner. They acknowledge several different recipients, have runners-up, and have third place. Since this is a specific recognition and is different from losing an award, runner-up mentions are considered wins in this award tally. For simplification and to avoid errors, each award in this list has been presumed to have had a prior nomination.)
- Wins: 82
- Nominations: 220

Women Talking is a 2022 American drama film written and directed by Sarah Polley. It is based on the 2018 novel of the same name by Miriam Toews, and inspired by real-life events that occurred at the Manitoba Colony in Bolivia. The film stars Rooney Mara, Claire Foy, Jessie Buckley, Judith Ivey, Ben Whishaw, and Frances McDormand, who is also a producer on the film.

Women Talking had its world premiere at the 49th Telluride Film Festival on September 2, 2022, and was released in select cinemas in the United States on December 23, 2022, before a wide release on January 20, 2023, by United Artists Releasing. The film received acclaim from critics, who praised Polley's screenplay and direction, the performances of the cast (particularly Foy, Buckley, and Whishaw) and score. It was also named one of the top ten films of 2022 by the National Board of Review and the American Film Institute.

Polley received the Telluride Film Festival Silver Medallion tribute award. Composer Hildur Guðnadóttir received a tribute award at the 2022 Toronto International Film Festival. At the 95th Academy Awards the film was nominated for Best Picture and Polley won the award for Best Adapted Screenplay. It was the first film from Orion Pictures to be nominated for Best Picture since The Silence of the Lambs. It was also nominated for Best Screenplay and Best Original Score at the 80th Golden Globe Awards, Best Ensemble Cast of a Motion Picture at the 29th Screen Actors Guild Awards, and received 6 nominations at the 28th Critics' Choice Awards, including Best Picture.

== Accolades ==
Award	Date of ceremony	Category	Recipient(s)	Result	Ref.
AARP Movies for Grownups Awards	January 28, 2023	Best Movie for Grownups	Women Talking	Nominated	
AARP Movies for Grownups Awards	January 28, 2023	Best Supporting Actress	Judith Ivey	Won	
AARP Movies for Grownups Awards	January 28, 2023	Best Ensemble	Women Talking	Nominated	
Academy Awards	March 12, 2023	Best Picture	Dede Gardner, Jeremy Kleiner and Frances McDormand	Nominated	
Academy Awards	March 12, 2023	Best Adapted Screenplay	Sarah Polley	Won	
Alliance of Women Film Journalists	January 5, 2023	Best Film	Women Talking	Nominated	
Alliance of Women Film Journalists	January 5, 2023	Best Director	Sarah Polley	Won	
Alliance of Women Film Journalists	January 5, 2023	Best Woman Director	Sarah Polley	Nominated	
Alliance of Women Film Journalists	January 5, 2023	Best Actor in a Supporting Role	Ben Whishaw	Nominated	
Alliance of Women Film Journalists	January 5, 2023	Best Actress in a Supporting Role	Jessie Buckley	Nominated	
Alliance of Women Film Journalists	January 5, 2023	Best Screenplay, Adapted	Sarah Polley	Won	
Alliance of Women Film Journalists	January 5, 2023	Best Ensemble Cast – Casting Director	John Buchan and Jason Knight	Won	
Alliance of Women Film Journalists	January 5, 2023	Best Editing	Christopher Donaldson and Roslyn Kalloo	Nominated	
Alliance of Women Film Journalists	January 5, 2023	Best Woman Screenwriter	Sarah Polley and Miriam Toews	Won	
American Film Institute Awards	December 9, 2022	Top 10 Films of the Year	Women Talking	Won	
Austin Film Critics Association	January 10, 2023	Best Adapted Screenplay	Sarah Polley and Miriam Toews	Nominated	
Austin Film Critics Association	January 10, 2023	Best Ensemble	Women Talking	Nominated	
Boston Society of Film Critics	December 11, 2022	Best Cast	Women Talking	Won	
Chicago Film Critics Association	December 14, 2022	Best Director	Sarah Polley	Nominated	
Chicago Film Critics Association	December 14, 2022	Best Adapted Screenplay	Sarah Polley	Won	
Costume Designers Guild Awards	February 27, 2023	Excellence in Contemporary Film	Quita Alfred	Nominated	
Critics' Choice Movie Awards	January 15, 2023	Best Picture	Women Talking	Nominated	
Critics' Choice Movie Awards	January 15, 2023	Best Director	Sarah Polley	Nominated	
Critics' Choice Movie Awards	January 15, 2023	Best Supporting Actress	Jessie Buckley	Nominated	
Critics' Choice Movie Awards	January 15, 2023	Best Adapted Screenplay	Sarah Polley	Won	
Critics' Choice Movie Awards	January 15, 2023	Best Score	Hildur Guðnadóttir	Nominated	
Critics' Choice Movie Awards	January 15, 2023	Best Acting Ensemble	Women Talking	Nominated	
Dallas–Fort Worth Film Critics Association	December 19, 2022	Best Picture	Women Talking	6th place	
Dallas–Fort Worth Film Critics Association	December 19, 2022	Best Director	Sarah Polley	5th place	
Dallas–Fort Worth Film Critics Association	December 19, 2022	Best Supporting Actor	Ben Whishaw	5th place	
Dallas–Fort Worth Film Critics Association	December 19, 2022	Best Supporting Actress	Jessie Buckley	4th place	
Florida Film Critics Circle	December 22, 2022	Best Supporting Actress	Jessie Buckley	Won (Note: Tied with Nina Hoss for Tár.)	
Florida Film Critics Circle	December 22, 2022	Best Adapted Screenplay	Sarah Polley	Won	
Georgia Film Critics Association	January 13, 2023	Best Adapted Screenplay	Sarah Polley	Nominated	
Georgia Film Critics Association	January 13, 2023	Best Ensemble	Women Talking	Nominated	
Golden Globe Awards	January 10, 2023	Best Screenplay	Sarah Polley	Nominated	
Golden Globe Awards	January 10, 2023	Best Original Score	Hildur Guðnadóttir	Nominated	
Golden Trailer Awards	June 29, 2023	Best Drama	"VOTE" (JAX)	Nominated	
Golden Trailer Awards	June 29, 2023	Best Independent Trailer	"Unknown" (Mark Wallen & Associates)	Won	
Golden Trailer Awards	June 29, 2023	Best BTS/EPK for a Feature Film (Over 2 minutes)	"A New Forward" (The Fabulous Group)	Nominated	
Gotham Independent Film Awards	November 28, 2022	Outstanding Supporting Performance	Jessie Buckley	Nominated	
Gotham Independent Film Awards	November 28, 2022	Outstanding Supporting Performance	Ben Whishaw	Nominated	
Gotham Independent Film Awards	November 28, 2022	Best Screenplay	Sarah Polley	Nominated	
Hollywood Critics Association Awards	February 24, 2023	Best Picture	Women Talking	Nominated	
Hollywood Critics Association Awards	February 24, 2023	Best Director	Sarah Polley	Nominated	
Hollywood Critics Association Awards	February 24, 2023	Best Supporting Actor	Ben Whishaw	Nominated	
Hollywood Critics Association Awards	February 24, 2023	Best Adapted Screenplay	Sarah Polley	Won	
Hollywood Critics Association Awards	February 24, 2023	Best Cast Ensemble	Women Talking	Nominated	
Hollywood Critics Association Creative Arts Awards	February 17, 2023	Best Casting Director	John Buchan and Jason Knight	Nominated	
Hollywood Critics Association Creative Arts Awards	February 17, 2023	Best Score	Hildur Guðnadóttir	Nominated	
Hollywood Music in Media Awards	November 16, 2022	Best Original Score in a Feature Film	Hildur Guðnadóttir	Nominated	
Houston Film Critics Society	February 18, 2023	Best Picture	Women Talking	Nominated	
Houston Film Critics Society	February 18, 2023	Best Director	Sarah Polley	Nominated	
Houston Film Critics Society	February 18, 2023	Best Supporting Actor	Ben Whishaw	Nominated	
Houston Film Critics Society	February 18, 2023	Best Supporting Actress	Jessie Buckley	Nominated	
Houston Film Critics Society	February 18, 2023	Best Screenplay	Sarah Polley	Nominated	
Houston Film Critics Society	February 18, 2023	Best Original Score	Hildur Guðnadóttir	Nominated	
Houston Film Critics Society	February 18, 2023	Best Ensemble Cast	Women Talking	Won	
Independent Spirit Awards	March 4, 2023	Best Feature	Dede Gardner, Jeremy Kleiner, Frances McDormand	Nominated	
Independent Spirit Awards	March 4, 2023	Best Director	Sarah Polley	Nominated	
Independent Spirit Awards	March 4, 2023	Best Screenplay	Sarah Polley	Nominated	
Independent Spirit Awards	March 4, 2023	Robert Altman Award	Sarah Polley, John Buchan, Jason Knight, Shayla Brown, Jessie Buckley, Claire Foy, Kira Guloien, Kate Hallett, Judith Ivey, Rooney Mara, Sheila McCarthy, Frances McDormand, Michelle McLeod, Liv McNeil, Ben Whishaw, August Winter	Won	
IFTA Film & Drama Awards	March 7, 2023	Best Supporting Actress	Jessie Buckley	Nominated	
London Film Critics' Circle	February 5, 2023	British/Irish Actress of the Year (for body of work)	Jessie Buckley	Nominated	
Los Angeles Film Critics Association	December 11, 2022	Best Supporting Performance	Jessie Buckley	Runner-up	
Mill Valley Film Festival	October 18, 2022	Mind the Gap Award	Women Talking	Won	
National Board of Review	December 8, 2022	Top Ten Films	Women Talking	Won	
National Board of Review	December 8, 2022	Best Ensemble	Women Talking	Won	
Online Film Critics Society	January 23, 2023	Best Picture	Women Talking	9th place	
Online Film Critics Society	January 23, 2023	Best Adapted Screenplay	Sarah Polley	Nominated	
Online Film Critics Society	January 23, 2023	Best Original Score	Hildur Guðnadóttir	Nominated	
San Diego Film Critics Society	January 6, 2023	Best Adapted Screenplay	Sarah Polley and Miriam Toews	Runner-up	
San Diego Film Critics Society	January 6, 2023	Best Breakthrough Artist	Jessie Buckley	Nominated	
San Diego Film Critics Society	January 6, 2023	Best Ensemble	Women Talking	Runner-up	
San Francisco Bay Area Film Critics Circle	January 9, 2023	Best Picture	Women Talking	Nominated	
San Francisco Bay Area Film Critics Circle	January 9, 2023	Best Director	Sarah Polley	Nominated	
San Francisco Bay Area Film Critics Circle	January 9, 2023	Best Supporting Actor	Ben Whishaw	Nominated	
San Francisco Bay Area Film Critics Circle	January 9, 2023	Best Supporting Actress	Claire Foy	Nominated	
San Francisco Bay Area Film Critics Circle	January 9, 2023	Best Adapted Screenplay	Sarah Polley	Won	
San Francisco Bay Area Film Critics Circle	January 9, 2023	Best Original Score	Hildur Guðnadóttir	Won	
Satellite Awards	February 11, 2023	Best Motion Picture – Drama	Women Talking	Nominated	
Satellite Awards	February 11, 2023	Best Director	Sarah Polley	Nominated	
Satellite Awards	February 11, 2023	Best Actor in a Supporting Role	Ben Whishaw	Nominated	
Satellite Awards	February 11, 2023	Best Actress in a Supporting Role	Claire Foy	Won	
Satellite Awards	February 11, 2023	Best Adapted Screenplay	Sarah Polley	Won	
Satellite Awards	February 11, 2023	Best Original Score	Hildur Guðnadóttir	Nominated	
Screen Actors Guild Award	February 26, 2023	Outstanding Performance by a Cast in a Motion Picture	Jessie Buckley, Claire Foy, Kate Hallett, Judith Ivey, Rooney Mara, Sheila McCarthy, Frances McDormand, Michelle McLeod, Liv McNeil, Ben Whishaw, August Winter	Nominated	
St. Louis Film Critics Association	December 18, 2022	Best Film	Women Talking	Nominated	
St. Louis Film Critics Association	December 18, 2022	Best Director	Sarah Polley	Won	
St. Louis Film Critics Association	December 18, 2022	Best Supporting Actor	Ben Whishaw	Nominated	
St. Louis Film Critics Association	December 18, 2022	Best Supporting Actress	Claire Foy	Nominated	
St. Louis Film Critics Association	December 18, 2022	Best Adapted Screenplay	Sarah Polley and Miriam Toews	Nominated	
St. Louis Film Critics Association	December 18, 2022	Best Cinematography	Luc Montpellier	Nominated	
St. Louis Film Critics Association	December 18, 2022	Best Score	Hildur Guðnadóttir	Won	
St. Louis Film Critics Association	December 18, 2022	Best Ensemble	Women Talking	Won	
Toronto Film Critics Association	January 8, 2023	Best Film	Women Talking	Runner-up	
Toronto Film Critics Association	January 8, 2023	Best Director	Sarah Polley	Runner-up	
Toronto Film Critics Association	January 8, 2023	Best Supporting Actress	Jessie Buckley	Runner-up	
Toronto Film Critics Association	January 8, 2023	Best Screenplay	Sarah Polley	Runner-up	
Toronto International Film Festival	September 18, 2022	People's Choice Award	Women Talking	Runner-up	
USC Scripter Awards	March 4, 2023	Best Adapted Screenplay – Film	Sarah Polley and Miriam Toews	Won	
Vancouver Film Critics Circle	February 13, 2023	Best Supporting Actress	Jessie Buckley	Won	
Vancouver Film Critics Circle	February 13, 2023	Best Director of a Canadian Film	Sarah Polley	Won	
Vancouver Film Critics Circle	February 13, 2023	Best Supporting Actress in a Canadian Film	Judith Ivey	Won	
Washington D.C. Area Film Critics Association	December 12, 2022	Best Director	Sarah Polley	Nominated	
Washington D.C. Area Film Critics Association	December 12, 2022	Best Supporting Actor	Ben Whishaw	Nominated	
Washington D.C. Area Film Critics Association	December 12, 2022	Best Adapted Screenplay	Sarah Polley	Nominated	
Washington D.C. Area Film Critics Association	December 12, 2022	Best Original Score	Hildur Guðnadóttir	Nominated	
Washington D.C. Area Film Critics Association	December 12, 2022	Best Acting Ensemble	Women Talking	Nominated	
Windsor International Film Festival	November 7, 2022	People's Choice Award	Women Talking	Won	
Writers Guild of America Awards	March 5, 2023	Best Adapted Screenplay	Sarah Polley	Won	
