= List of awards and nominations received by Rooney Mara =

Rooney Mara awards and nominations
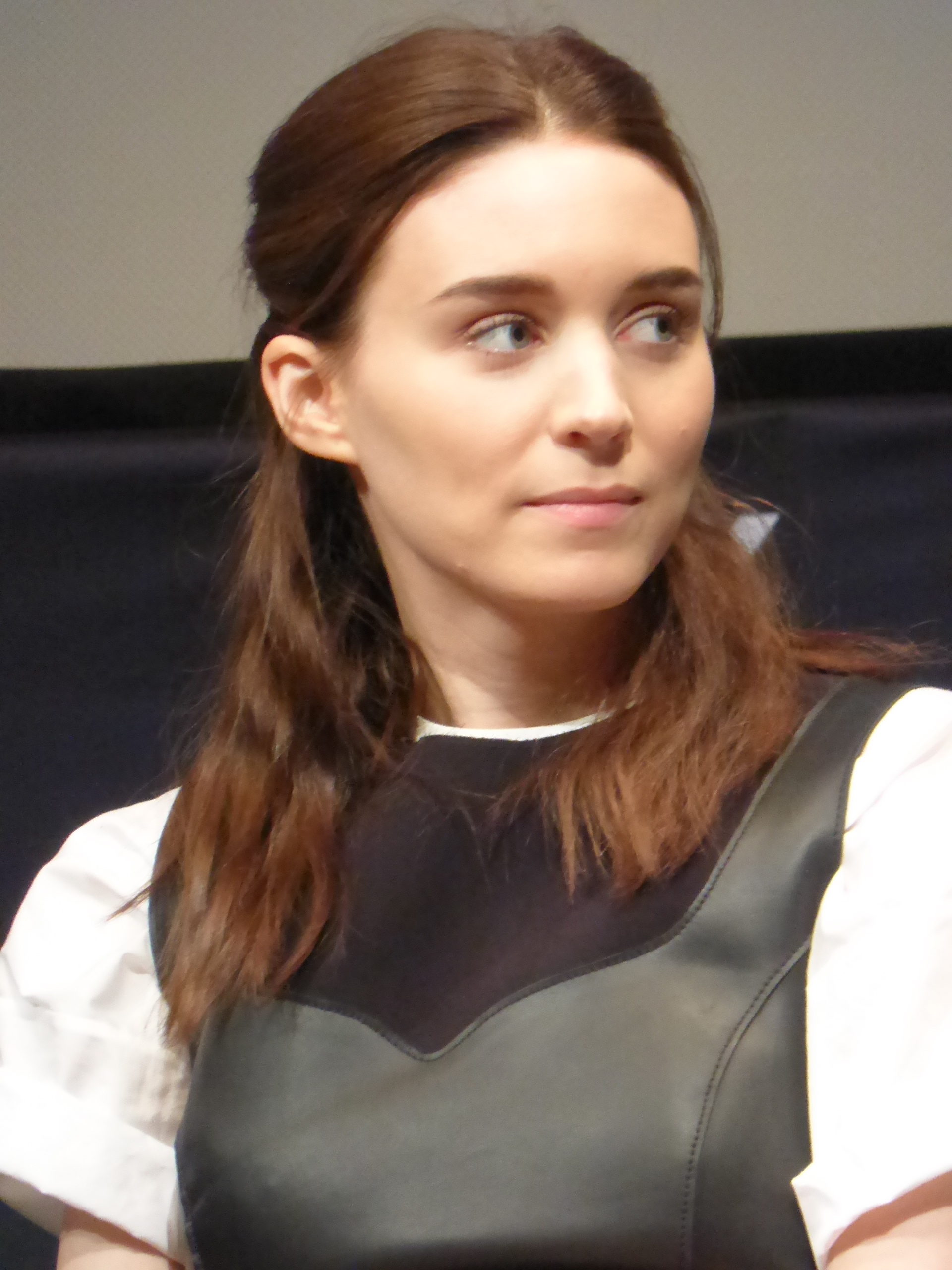
- Mara at the 2013 New York Film Festival
Awards and nominations
Award	Wins	Nominations
Academy Awards	0	2
Actor Awards	0	2
British Academy Film Awards	0	1
Critics' Choice Awards	0	3
Golden Globe Awards	0	2

Totals (Note: Certain award groups do not simply award one winner. They acknowledge several different recipients, have runners-up, and have third place. Since this is a specific recognition and is different from losing an award, runner-up mentions are considered wins in this award tally. For simplification and to avoid errors, each award in this list has been presumed to have had a prior nomination.)
- Wins: 16
- Nominations: 54

Rooney Mara is an American actress. Mara's first credited television role was a guest appearance in the NBC crime drama series Law & Order: Special Victims Unit in 2006. Along with the other The Social Network (2010) cast members, she received a nomination for the Critics' Choice Movie Award for Best Acting Ensemble. After playing minor roles in several films and television shows, she starred in her first major role as Lisbeth Salander in the 2011 film adaptation of Stieg Larsson's The Girl with the Dragon Tattoo—the role brought her international recognition. She received several nominations for her performance, including the Academy Award for Best Actress, the Golden Globe Award for Best Actress in a Motion Picture – Drama, the Empire Award for Best Actress, and the Saturn Award for Best Actress, and won a Breakthrough Performance Award from the National Board of Review.

Mara starred in Todd Haynes's romantic drama Carol (2015), based on the 1952 romance novel The Price of Salt by Patricia Highsmith (republished as Carol in 1990). Her performance in the film garnered widespread critical acclaim and earned her nominations for the Academy Award for Best Supporting Actress, the BAFTA Award for Best Actress in a Supporting Role, and the Golden Globe Award for Best Actress in a Motion Picture – Drama, and won her the Cannes Film Festival Award for Best Actress. In Pan (2015), her portraying of the character Tiger Lily received mixed critical reviews, and garnered her a Golden Raspberry Award for Worst Supporting Actress nomination. Mara's performance as Mary Magdalene, who traveled with Jesus as one of his followers, in the biographical drama Mary Magdalene (2018), garnered her nominations for the AACTA Award for Best Actress in a Leading Role and the Asia Pacific Screen Award for Best Performance by an Actress.

== Major associations ==
=== Academy Awards ===
Year	Category	Nominated work	Result	Ref.
2012	Best Actress	The Girl with the Dragon Tattoo	Nominated	
2016	Best Supporting Actress	Carol	Nominated	

=== Actor Awards ===
Year	Category	Nominated work	Result	Ref.
2016	Outstanding Female Actor in a Supporting Role	Carol	Nominated	
2023	Outstanding Cast in a Motion Picture	Women Talking	Nominated (Note: Shared with Jessie Buckley, Claire Foy, Kate Hallett, Judith Ivey, Sheila McCarthy, Frances McDormand, Michelle McLeod, Liv McNeil, Ben Whishaw, and August Winter)	

=== BAFTA Awards ===
Year	Category	Nominated work	Result	Ref.
British Academy Film Awards
2016	Best Actress in a Supporting Role	Carol	Nominated	

=== Critics' Choice Awards ===
Year	Category	Nominated work	Result	Ref.
Film
2011	Best Acting Ensemble	The Social Network	Nominated (Note: Shared with Jesse Eisenberg, Andrew Garfield, John Getz, Denise Grayson, Armie Hammer, Dakota Johnson, Rashida Jones, Joseph Mazzello, Max Minghella, Josh Pence, Brenda Song, and Justin Timberlake)	
2016	Best Supporting Actress	Carol	Nominated	
2023	Best Acting Ensemble	Women Talking	Nominated (Note: Shared with Claire Foy, Jessie Buckley, Judith Ivey, Ben Whishaw, Frances McDormand, Sheila McCarthy, Michelle McLeod, Kate Hallett, Liv McNeil, Emily Mitchell, Kira Guloien, Shayla Brown, and August Winter)	

=== Golden Globe Awards ===
Year	Category	Nominated work	Result	Ref.
2012	Best Actress in a Motion Picture – Drama	The Girl with the Dragon Tattoo	Nominated	
2016	Best Actress in a Motion Picture – Drama	Carol	Nominated	

== Other associations ==
Awards and nominations received by Rooney Mara
Award/Organization	Year	Category	Work	Result	Ref.
Alliance of Women Film Journalists	2011	Best Breakthrough Performance	The Girl with the Dragon Tattoo	Nominated	
Alliance of Women Film Journalists	2011	Best Depiction of Nudity, Sexuality, or Seduction	The Girl with the Dragon Tattoo	Nominated (Note: Shared with Daniel Craig)	
Alliance of Women Film Journalists	2011	Kick Ass Award for Best Female Action Star	The Girl with the Dragon Tattoo	Won (Note: Tied with Saoirse Ronan for Hanna)	
Alliance of Women Film Journalists	2011	Most Egregious Age Difference Between the Leading Man and the Love Interest	The Girl with the Dragon Tattoo	Nominated	
Alliance of Women Film Journalists	2015	Best Supporting Actress	Carol	Nominated	
Asia Pacific Screen Awards	2018	Best Performance by an Actress	Mary Magdalene	Nominated	
Austin Film Critics Association	2015	Best Actress	Carol	Nominated	
Australian Academy of Cinema and Television Arts Awards	2016	Best Supporting Actress	Carol	Won	
Australian Academy of Cinema and Television Arts Awards	2019	Best Actress in a Leading Role	Mary Magdalene	Nominated	
Cannes Film Festival	2015	Best Actress	Carol	Won (Note: Tied with Emmanuelle Bercot for Mon Roi)	
Dallas–Fort Worth Film Critics Association	2015	Best Supporting Actress	Carol	Won	
Dorian Awards	2012	Film Performance of the Year – Actress	The Girl with the Dragon Tattoo	Nominated	
Dorian Awards	2016	Film Performance of the Year – Actress	Carol	Nominated	
Dublin Film Critics' Circle	2013	Best Actress	Ain't Them Bodies Saints	6th place (Note: Tied with Sandra Bullock for Gravity)	
Dublin Film Critics' Circle	2015	Best Actress	Carol	Runner-up	
Empire Awards	2012	Best Actress	The Girl with the Dragon Tattoo	Nominated	
Florida Film Critics Circle	2015	Best Supporting Actress	Carol	Nominated	
Georgia Film Critics Association	2011	Best Actress	The Girl with the Dragon Tattoo	Nominated	
Georgia Film Critics Association	2015	Best Actress	Carol	Nominated	
Golden Raspberry Awards	2016	Worst Supporting Actress	Pan	Nominated	
Hollywood Film Awards	2010	Ensemble of the Year	The Social Network	Won	
Houston Film Critics Society	2015	Best Supporting Actress	Carol	Won	
Independent Spirit Awards	2016	Best Female Lead	Carol	Nominated	
IndieWire Critics Poll	2015	Best Supporting Actress	Carol	6th place	
International Cinephile Society	2016	Best Actress	Carol	Won	
London Film Critics' Circle	2015	Actress of the Year	Carol	Nominated	
MTV Movie Awards	2012	Best Female Performance	The Girl with the Dragon Tattoo	Nominated	
MTV Movie Awards	2012	Best Breakthrough Performance	The Girl with the Dragon Tattoo	Nominated	
MTV Movie Awards	2012	Best On-Screen Transformation	The Girl with the Dragon Tattoo	Nominated	
National Board of Review	2011	Breakthrough Performance	The Girl with the Dragon Tattoo	Won (Note: Tied with Felicity Jones for Like Crazy)	
New York Film Critics Online	2015	Best Supporting Actress	Carol	Won	
Online Film Critics Society	2015	Best Supporting Actress	Carol	Won	
Palm Springs International Film Festival	2011	Ensemble Cast Award	The Social Network	Won	
Palm Springs International Film Festival	2016	Spotlight Award	Carol	Won	
San Francisco Bay Area Film Critics Circle	2015	Best Actress	Carol	Nominated	
Santa Barbara International Film Festival	2012	Cinema Vanguard Award	The Girl with the Dragon Tattoo	Won	
Santa Barbara International Film Festival	2016	Virtuoso Award	Carol	Won	
Satellite Awards	2016	Best Supporting Actress – Motion Picture	Carol	Nominated	
Saturn Awards	2012	Best Actress	The Girl with the Dragon Tattoo	Nominated	
St. Louis Film Critics Association	2011	Best Actress	The Girl with the Dragon Tattoo	Won	
St. Louis Film Critics Association	2015	Best Supporting Actress	Carol	Runner-up (Note: Tied with Kristen Stewart for Clouds of Sils Maria)	
Telluride Film Festival	2015	Silver Medallion	—	Won	
Toronto Film Critics Association	2015	Best Supporting Actress	Carol	Nominated	
Village Voice Film Poll	2015	Best Supporting Actress	Carol	Runner-up	
Washington D.C. Area Film Critics Association	2015	Best Supporting Actress	Carol	Nominated	
