= Bolivian Mennonite gas-facilitated rapes =

Mass sexual assaults (2005–2009)

Bolivian Mennonite gas-facilitated serial gang-rape case
- Location: Manitoba Colony, Bolivia
- Date: 2005–2009
- Victim: >151
- Perpetrators: Jacobo Neudorf Enss, Jacobo Wall Wall, Franz Dick Wall, David Guenther Banman, Abraham Peters Dick, Jacob Wiebe Knelsen, Johan Bolt Ham, Jacobo Wiebe Lowen, Peter Friesen Neufeld, Heinrich Knelsen Klassen; Peter Wiebe Wall (accomplice)

The Bolivian Mennonite gas-facilitated rapes were mass serial rapes by a group of men over at least four years in the Bolivian Mennonite settlement of Manitoba Colony in Bolivia. At least nine male members of the colony sprayed a veterinary sedative through window screens to render whole households unconscious. They then entered homes and raped the residents, particularly women and girls. The minimum number of known victims stands at 151. Many victims were raped on multiple occasions. The youngest victim was three years old and the oldest was 65. Multiple victims were pregnant at the time of the rapes and one delivered an extremely premature baby after going into labor following a rape. There are believed to have been both adult and child male victims as well, but none were publicly identified. The perpetrators were in some cases blood relatives of the victims, the crimes thus including incestuous abuse.

The victims awoke with, variously, bruising, bleeding, semen deposits, torn clothing, missing clothing, rope burns, or dirty handprints on their bodies, but could not clearly remember what happened due to the anesthetic's effect on short-term memory. Apparent dreams, brief impressions, a "head-thumping stupor", and inability to react were also reported. The series of mystery attacks were thus initially attributed to Satan, demons, or phantoms; a popular name for the crimes is the ghost rapes of Bolivia. A culture of modesty, privacy and/or secrecy initially prevented victims from communicating about their experiences, even amongst household members and families.

The case is somewhat poorly documented in part because the insular Mennonite community chooses to be socially and culturally isolated, because few if any of the Plautdietsch-speaking victims know Bolivian Spanish, and because general education in the community is minimal and sexual education is poor or non-existent, preventing the women of the community from effectively documenting the attacks.

The initial series of rapes was interrupted when two of the perpetrators were caught breaking and entering in June 2009. They implicated seven others within the Manitoba Colony community of about 2,500 people. The culprits stated they had been committing the rapes since 2005. The men were turned over to Bolivian law enforcement for prosecution.

The following were the 11 men convicted, with their ages in 2009:

- Jacob Neudorf Enss, age 36
- Jacob Wiebe Wall, age 24
- Franz Dick Wall, age 21
- David Guenther Banman, age 21
- Abraham Peters Dick, age 18
- Jacob Wiebe Knelsen, age 41
- Johan Bolt Ham, age 18
- Peter Wiebe Wall, age 46
- Jacob Wiebe Lowen, age 23
- Peter Friesen Neufeld, age 38
- Heinrich Knelsen Klassen, age 27

The veterinarian who supplied the anesthetic gas, Peter Wiebe Wall, was sentenced to 12 years in prison. Seven convicted rapists were sentenced to 25 years each. The ninth accused man, Jacob Neudorf Enns, escaped prison shortly after being arrested; he remained a fugitive as of 2011, and was later reported to be living in Paraguay, which also has a large Mennonite community. Two men were tried and convicted in related trials.

Many residents of the colony now have steel doors and window bars on their homes, where previously "houses were traditionally left wide open".

The story inspired the novel Women Talking by Miriam Toews, which was adapted into a 2022 film of the same name.

The Bolivian Mennonite gas-facilitated rapes may be part of a larger pattern of systemic sexual and incestual abuse within the Mennonite Old Colonies.

== See also ==
- Drug-facilitated sexual assault
- Pelicot rape case
