= Cortez (film) =

- Directed by: Cheryl Nichols
- Written by: Cheryl Nichols; Aaron Shiver
- Produced by: Joshua Bunting; Johnny Long; Cheryl Nichols; Aaron Shiver
- Starring: Aaron Shiver; Cheryl Nichols; Drago Sumonja; Jackson Shiver; Judith Ivey
- Cinematography: Kelly Moore
- Edited by: F. Rocky Jameson
- Music by: Sean Watkins
- Production company: EchoWolf Productions
- Release date: 20 January 2017 (Slamdance Film Festival)
- Running time: 99 minutes
- Country: United States
- Language: English

Cortez is a 2017 American romantic drama film directed by Cheryl Nichols, starring Aaron Shiver, Nichols, Drago Sumonja, Jackson Shiver and Judith Ivey. The film was Nichol's debut feature.

== Cast ==
- Aaron Shiver as Jesse
- Cheryl Nichols as Anne
- Drago Sumonja as Eric
- Jackson Shiver as Ben
- Judith Ivey as Sandy
- Cassidy Freeman as Rosie
- Dylan Kenin as Raphael
- Jon Kristian Moore as Tim
- John Bishop as Chet
- Rick Dacey as Nick
- Clark Freeman as Roadie Dan
- Jerry Gardner as Charles
- Johnny Long as Dirty Dave
- Jake Waid as Lou

== Release ==
The film premiered at the Slamdance Film Festival on 20 January 2017.

== Reception ==
Ali Shimkus of SLUG Magazine wrote, "Cinematically, Cortez is a beautiful film and focuses on the wild, unpredictable nature of the Southwest, juxtaposed against Jesse’s similarly uncontrollable personality."

Teresa Nieman of ScreenAnarchy wrote that Nichols "has an excellent sense of when to let the camera drift or dance, and when to minimize its presence.".

Michael Abatemarco of The Santa Fe New Mexican wrote that the film "feels honest in its depiction of this soured relationship", and called the performances "authentic".
