= Robert W. Lenski =

American screenwriter (1926–2002)

- Born: June 11, 1926; Michigan, U.S.
- Died: June 19, 2002 (aged 76); Los Angeles, California, U.S.
- Education: University of Michigan
- Occupation: Screenwriter
- Spouse: Leah Lenski

Robert W. Lenski (June 11, 1926 – June 19, 2002) was an American screenwriter.

Lenski was born on a farm in Michigan. He served in the Marines during World War II, landing on Iwo Jima. He then attended the University of Michigan, earning a degree in English and journalism. He then worked as a journalist in Jackson, Michigan

Lenski began his screenwriting career in 1972, writing an episode for the police procedural television series Longstreet. His credits for television series included The Streets of San Francisco, Mannix, Planet of the Apes, Cannon, The Dain Curse, Barnaby Jones, The F.B.I., The New Perry Mason and Kojak. He also wrote for television films, including After the Promise, Decoration Day, Saint Maybe, Breathing Lessons and What the Deaf Man Heard.

Lenski was nominated for three Primetime Emmy Awards between 1978 and 1994. His last screenwriting credit was for the television film A Death in the Family.

Lenski died in June 2002 of cancer at his home in Los Angeles, California, at the age of 76.
