= Decoration Day (film) =

1990 television film by Robert Markowitz

- Based on: Decoration Day by John William Corrington
- Written by: Robert W. Lenski
- Directed by: Robert Markowitz
- Starring: James Garner; Judith Ivey; Bill Cobbs; Ruby Dee; Laurence Fishburne
- Composer: Patrick Williams
- Country of origin: United States
- Original language: English

Production
- Executive producer: Marian Rees
- Producer: Anne Hopkins
- Cinematography: Neil Roach
- Editor: Harvey Rosenstock
- Running time: 100 minutes
- Production companies: Hallmark Hall of Fame Productions; Marian Rees Associates; Vantage Entertainment Group
- Budget: $3.8 million

Original release
- Network: NBC
- Release: December 2, 1990

Decoration Day is an American drama television film that premiered on NBC on December 2, 1990, as part of the Hallmark Hall of Fame anthology series. It is directed by Robert Markowitz and written by Robert W. Lenski, based on the novella of the same name by John William Corrington. The film stars James Garner, Judith Ivey, Bill Cobbs, Ruby Dee, and Laurence Fishburne. It follows Albert Sidney Finch, a retired Georgia judge deciding to help his boyhood friend, a black World War II veteran from whom Finch has been estranged for 30 years.

The film won two Golden Globe Awards, for Best Miniseries or Television Film and Best Actor in a Miniseries or Television Film for Garner. It also earned six Primetime Emmy Award nominations, including Outstanding Drama/Comedy Special and Miniseries, with Dee winning Outstanding Supporting Actress in a Miniseries or a Special for her performance as Rowena, Finch's longtime housekeeper.

== Plot ==
James Garner plays a retired judge and recluse who comes out of "hiding" to investigate when his childhood friend (Bill Cobbs) refuses to accept a Medal of Honor awarded decades ago in World War II. His reason is kept in confidence and Garner's character files a motion to deny the ceremony. Meanwhile, the personal lives of the other characters have issues of their own to work out. In the end of things Cobbs' character is told of something he didn't know about and the two romantic side stories resolve in a positive fashion.

== Cast ==
- James Garner as Albert Sidney Finch
- Judith Ivey as Terry Novis
- Bill Cobbs as Gee Pennywell
- Ruby Dee as Rowena
- Laurence Fishburne as Michael Waring
- Jo Anderson as Loreen Wendell
- Norm Skaggs as Billy Wendell
- Wallace Wilkinson as Judge Wesley
- Ric Reitz as Young Albert
- Jonathan Peck as Young Gee

== Reception ==
=== Critical response ===
John J. O'Connor of The New York Times wrote: "Directed with all deliberate thoughtfulness by Robert Markowitz, Decoration Day proceeds without fireworks, taking its time and carefully revealing its gentle insights into memory, friendship, race relations and the simple fact that time passes and things change. Surrounded by an impeccable supporting cast, Mr. Garner brings to television still another uncommonly fine performance." Ken Tucker of Entertainment Weekly gave the film an A−, saying it "starts out like the ultimate Hallmark Hall of Fame, a video greeting card designed to warm your heart. But very quickly it becomes something better than that." Tucker also called it a "shrewdly conceived drama." Tom Shales of The Washington Post described Decoration Day as a "dreary tear-jerker," and opined that it "serves up a powerful load of mush, much mushier than it is powerful." Shales also wrote: "Director Robert Markowitz succeeds at making the slow pace work for the story and the bucolic Georgia setting, but he can't do much about the script's tiring talkiness. When the words get to be too much, he sends Garner off to the lake to ponder the meaning of it all." Ray Loynd of the Los Angeles Times stated that the film "certainly unfurls the Hallmark banner: an intelligent script, a measured rather than aggressive tone, and the affirmation of loyalty, heroism and, in this case, the restorative powers of memory (fluidly captured in flashbacks, including German war scenes)."

=== Accolades ===
Year	Award	Category	Recipient(s)	Result	Ref.
1991	48th Golden Globe Awards	Best Miniseries or Television Film	Decoration Day	Won	
1991	48th Golden Globe Awards	Best Actor in a Miniseries or Television Film	James Garner	Won	
1991	43rd Primetime Emmy Awards	Outstanding Drama/Comedy Special and Miniseries	Joyce Corrington, Dick Gallegly, Anne Hopkins, Marian Rees	Nominated	
1991	43rd Primetime Emmy Awards	Outstanding Lead Actor in a Miniseries or a Special	James Garner	Nominated	
1991	43rd Primetime Emmy Awards	Outstanding Supporting Actress in a Miniseries or a Special	Ruby Dee	Won	
1991	43rd Primetime Emmy Awards	Outstanding Directing in a Miniseries or a Special	Robert Markowitz	Nominated	
1991	43rd Primetime Emmy Awards	Outstanding Writing in a Miniseries or a Special	Robert W. Lenski	Nominated	
1991	43rd Primetime Emmy Awards	Outstanding Achievement in Music Composition for a Miniseries or a Special (Dramatic Underscore)	Patrick Williams	Nominated	
1991	7th Artios Awards	Movie of the Week Casting	Marsha Kleinman	Nominated	
