= Women Talking (novel) =

2018 novel by Miriam Toews

- Author: Miriam Toews
- Language: English
- Genre: Novel
- Publisher: Alfred A. Knopf
- Publication date: 2018
- Publication place: Canada
- Media type: Print (hardback and paperback)
- Preceded by: All My Puny Sorrows
- Followed by: Fight Night

Women Talking is a 2018 novel by Canadian writer Miriam Toews. Her seventh novel, Toews describes it as "an imagined response to real events," the gas-facilitated rapes that took place on the Manitoba Colony, a remote and isolated Mennonite community in Bolivia: Between 2005 and 2009, over a hundred girls and women in the colony woke up to discover that they had been raped in their sleep. These nighttime attacks were denied or dismissed by colony elders until finally it was revealed that a group of men from the colony were spraying an animal anaesthetic into their victims' houses to render them unconscious. Toews' novel centers on the secret meetings of eight Mennonite women who, on behalf of the other women in the colony, must decide how to react to these traumatic events. They have only 48 hours before the colony men, who are away to post bail for the rapists, return.

The novel was a finalist for the Governor General's Award and the Trillium Book Award, and was longlisted for International Dublin Literary Award.

In 2022, the novel was adapted into a film, written and directed by Sarah Polley and starring Rooney Mara, Claire Foy, and Frances McDormand.

== Plot ==
Women Talking opens with a note from the author in which she describes her novel as both "a reaction through fiction" to true-life events and "an act of female imagination". The true-life events Toews refers to took place in the Manitoba Colony, a remote Mennonite community in Bolivia. Over a period of years, from 2005 to 2009, girls and women would wake up to discover they had been raped. The nighttime attacks were attributed to ghosts and demons, or said to be God's punishment for their sins, or merely the result of "wild female imagination". Eventually, it was revealed a group of male colonists had been using a chemical spray to sedate whole households in order to sexually assault the women. In 2011, eight men were convicted in a Bolivian court, each one receiving a lengthy prison sentence.

Women Talking takes place in a Mennonite Colony called Molotschna in the aftermath of similarly traumatic events. Eight men believed to have committed the nighttime attacks are captured and locked in a shed. One of them is accidentally killed while being confronted by a group of angry colonists and another is attacked with a scythe by Salome, one of the raped women. Peters, the bishop of Molotschna, calls in the city police to have the suspects arrested for their own protection. Now the men have gone to the city to post bail for the suspects so that they can await trial from home. It will also give the women the opportunity to forgive the men in order to guarantee everyone's place in heaven. Any woman who does not forgive the men, according to Peters, will be excommunicated.

While the men are away, the women of the colony hold a referendum. On the ballot are three options, each one represented by an illustration: forgive the men and do nothing; stay in the colony and fight; leave the colony. The votes are equal between 'stay and fight' and 'leave,' and eight women, four from the Friesen family, and four from the Loewen family, are appointed to break the deadlock. In the hours that remain before the men return, the women hold secret meetings in a hayloft to debate the issue and come to a decision.

Over two days—June 6 and 7, 2009—the women have a series of urgent debates: how to maintain their faith in light of the abuse, whether they will truly be denied entry into heaven if they refuse to forgive their offenders, what it means to forgive and to heal, and the pros and cons of staying or leaving. Each of the eight women has been the victim of multiple rapes, and Ona Friesen is pregnant with a rapist's child. Although the rapes are not depicted in the novel, their violent nature is evoked: Greta is wearing uncomfortable dentures because her teeth were knocked out during her attack, and the women have "faint scars, from rope burns or from cuts." The women are interrupted by the owner of the hayloft, the elderly and infirm Earnest Thiessen. He asks the women if they are plotting to burn down his barn. Agata, the eldest of the Friesens, answers, "No, Ernie, there's no plot, we're only women talking." Klaas, Mariche's husband, who has returned from the city to gather twelve horses for auction, also climbs into the hayloft and is told that the women have just finished quilting. That evening he gets drunk and beats Mariche.

The novel is presented as the minutes of the women's meetings, which are taken by August Epp, the colony's male schoolteacher who recently returned following a period of excommunication. August takes the minutes at the request of Ona, the object of his unrequited love and his childhood friend, as the women cannot read or write (they speak Plautdietsch). In addition to transcribing the women's conversations, he gradually reveals his own backstory: his parents' excommunication from the colony, his university studies in England, his arrest during a protest in London and imprisonment, his parents' death and disappearance, and his struggles with depression (which Mennonites call Narfa, meaning 'nerves').

Ultimately, the women decide to leave the colony along with any boys under the age of 15. However, they still risk being found out by the Koop brothers, who are guarding Greta's two beloved horses, Ruth and Cheryl, in the neighbouring Chortiza Colony. In order to secure the horses and ensure the brothers do not alert the men, Autje and Neitje, the two teenage girls, lure the brothers to the hayloft with the promise of sex, arguing that their virginity is already lost. While in the act, Salome knocks out the brothers with the same belladonna spray that was used on the women for years. She also uses the spray on Scarface Janz, a 'do nothing' woman, for fear she will find a way to get to the city to alert the men, and on her son, Aaron, who does not want to leave the colony. The women leave in a convoy of buggies.

August is left behind watching over the sleeping brothers, pondering the women's sudden absence, his own life and decisions, and anticipating the return of the colony men. He reveals that the real reason his family was excommunicated was because, at the age of twelve, he began to bear a remarkable resemblance to Bishop Peters. He also understands that Ona asked him to take the minutes, not because the women needed them, but because she perceived that he was suicidal and thought he would be safe in the company of the women, performing a task.

== Characters ==
- August Epp: The novel's narrator. Born in Molotschna but speaks and writes English, having lived in the United Kingdom after his parents were excommunicated, most likely because it became clear that August was the son of Bishop Peters (not his mother's husband). After being imprisoned for stealing a police horse at a protest in London, he returns to the colony to act as the schoolteacher. The other men in the colony regard him with suspicion and scorn. He is asked to record the minutes of the meeting by Ona, his childhood friend and the woman he loves.
- Greta (Loewen): The matriarch of the Loewen family. Her teeth were knocked out for crying during an attack and has painfully large dentures. Passionate about her horses, Ruth and Cheryl.
- Mariche (Loewen): Greta's older daughter, who is in a domestically abusive marriage to Klaus.
- Mejal (Loewen): Greta's younger daughter. Chain smoker with "a secret life."
- Autje (Loewen): Mariche's teenage daughter, who is close with Neitje.
- Agata (Friesen): The pragmatic matriarch of the Friesen family.
- Ona (Friesen): Agata's serene and dreamy older daughter, who is unmarried and pregnant as a result of rape. Her sister, Mina, hanged herself after discovering her daughter, Neitje’s, unconscious body smeared with blood and semen and being told by bishop Peters that it was "the work of Satan."
- Salome (Friesen): Agata's fiery younger daughter. Her rage is "Vesuvian" and "her eyes are never still." She attacks the perpetrators with a scythe after learning her three-year old daughter, Miep, has contracted a venereal disease after being raped.
- Neitje (Friesen): Agata's teenage granddaughter, whose mother committed suicide after learning of Neitje's rape, and who now lives with Salome. She draws the illustrations needed for the referendum.
- Scarface Janz: A stalwart member of the colony. The most vocal of the 'do nothing' women.
- Melvin Gerbrandt: Watches over the children while the women talk. Profoundly traumatized after losing a premature son conceived by rape, he changes his name from Nettie to Melvin and falls mute, refusing to speak to anyone but children.
- Peters: The bishop of Molotschna. Forbids outside helpers from entering the colony. His father, Peters Senior, excommunicated the Epp family. The belladonna spray is discovered in his dairy barn.

== Background ==
Mennonites started establishing colonies in Bolivia in the late 1950s after the government offered land in the Chiquitano dry forests region north of Santa Cruz de la Sierra, and promised exemption from military service, freedom of religion, and the right to dictate the education system. The first settlers came from Paraguayan and Mexican colonies which had been established thirty years earlier by fundamentalist Mennonites who fled Manitoba, Canada when the Canadian government began to enforce its official public-school curriculum. The Manitoba Colony was founded in 1991 and has a population of over 2000 members. Colonists wear plain dress and speak Plautdietsch. They travel in horse-drawn buggies, and modern technology including electricity and rubber tyes are spurned.. Boys receive an education until puberty, limited to High German, math, and religion. Many also learn Spanish, but intermarrying with any of the local population is strictly forbidden.

In August 2011, seven men from the Manitoba Colony were sentenced to 25 years in prison for rape, and an eighth man, a veterinarian, received eight years for supplying the drug used to debilitate the victims. A ninth man escaped before he could stand trial and remains a fugitive. All the men pleaded not guilty. While 150 women testified during the trial, the prosecution claimed that many hundreds more did not feel comfortable testifying; several of the men on trial were accused of threatening some of the women and their families not to testify. There are reports that the rapes by drugging continue to happen, not only in the Manitoba Colony but elsewhere.

Toews first heard about the rapes in the Manitoba Colony through the "Mennonite grapevine." She said she was horrified by the details of the crimes but not entirely surprised: "Extremist, closed communities are ripe for violence." When in 2009 the rumours were confirmed in the international press, she began to organize her thoughts and figure out how she was going to write about the story. However, before she could begin, her older sister Marjorie died by suicide (in 2010, as their father had 12 years before), and in her grief she wrote All My Puny Sorrows, a novel inspired by her sister. Women Talking came next, and Toews had a complete draft of the manuscript in early 2017.

Toews is herself of Frisian ancestry, a direct descendant of one of Canada's first Mennonite settlers, Klaas Reimer (1837–1906), who arrived in Steinbach, Manitoba in 1874 from what is now modern-day Ukraine. Steinbach's founders are directly related to the colonists in Bolivia, and it is located in the province from which the Bolivian colony derives its name. The personalities of the characters in Women Talking, Toews says, were all based on friends and family members from her hometown. Growing up in a religious, Mennonite town as part of the Kleine Gemeinde church, she witnessed first hand the harm that fundamentalism does to people, especially the truly faithful. In writing the novel, she says, "there was rage and heartbreak mixed with feelings of faith," and that the story contained all the questions she had about her own Mennonite community: "When I became a teenager, I started to understand the profound hypocrisy, the sanctimony, the authoritarianism, this culture of control, or rules, of punishment, all of these things that seemed to me to be so far, far away from the presence of God. It was that conflict that has enraged me for so many years."

== Reception ==
Women Talking received starred reviews in Booklist, Kirkus Reviews, Publishers Weekly, and was a New York Times Notable Book. It also appeared on a number of year-end best-book lists, including The Globe and Mail, The Toronto Star, Slate Magazine, Buzzfeed, The A.V. Club, Electric Lit, USA Today, The National Book Review, and The Guardian.

Anthony Cummins, writing for The Guardian, called the novel "brave and thoughtful" and praised Toews' "thoughtful and light" prose despite the book's dark subject matter.

Lily Meyer in NPR called the book "astonishing" and a "profoundly intelligent book"; while initially wary of the women's stories being told by a male narrator, she ultimately found that in doing so, Toews' "reverses the patriarchal structure under which these women live".

Women Talking also received positive reviews in the Canadian press, with the Toronto Star calling it "intelligent" and "finely calibrated" and The Globe and Mail praising it for investigating questions "vital" to women.

Women Talking was a shortlisted finalist for the Governor General's Award for English-language fiction at the 2018 Governor General's Awards, and for the 2019 Trillium Book Award. It was also longlisted for the 2020 International Dublin Literary Award.

== Film adaptation ==
On September 2, 2022, a feature length drama film adaptation of the novel, written and directed by Sarah Polley with an ensemble cast featuring Rooney Mara, Claire Foy, Jessie Buckley, Ben Whishaw, Judith Ivey and producer Frances McDormand, premiered at the Telluride Film Festival. At the 95th Academy Awards, the film was nominated for Best Picture, while Polley was awarded Best Adapted Screenplay.

== Translations ==
- Italian: Donne che parlano. Translated by Maurizia Balmelli. Milan: Marcos y Marcos. 27 September 2018. ISBN 9788871688299.
- French: Ce qu'elles disent, lit. 'What They Say'. Translated by Lori Saint-Martin and Paul Gagné. Paris: Buchet-Chastel. 22 August 2019. ISBN 9782283032725.
- Hungarian: Nők beszélgetnek. Translated by Eszter Molnár. Budapest: Európa. 2 September 2019. ISBN 9789635040254.
- Norwegian: Kvinnene snakker. Translated by Hilde Rød-Larsen. Oslo: Armada. 21 October 2019. ISBN 9788293687115.
- Spanish: Ellas hablan, lit. 'They Speak'. Translated by Julia Osuna Aguilar. Mexico City: Sexto Piso. 24 February 2020. ISBN 9788417517755.
- Chinese: 沒有聲音的女人們; pinyin: Méiyǒu shēngyīn de nǚrénmen; lit. 'Women Without Voices'. Translated by Li Jianxing. Taipei: Reading Times. 23 June 2020. ISBN 9789571382364.
- Turkish: Konuşan Kadınlar. Translated by Gül Korkmaz. Istanbul: Kafka Kitap. 31 March 2022. ISBN 9786257994521.
- Polish: Głosy kobiet. Translated by Kaja Gucio. Wołowiec: Czarne. 24 August 2022. ISBN 9788381915236.
