= What the Deaf Man Heard =

1997 television film directed by John Kent Harrison

- DVD cover
- Genre: Comedy-drama
- Based on: What the Deaf Man Heard by G. D. Gearino
- Teleplay by: Robert W. Lenski
- Directed by: John Kent Harrison
- Starring: Matthew Modine; James Earl Jones; Claire Bloom; Judith Ivey; Jerry O'Connell; Bernadette Peters; Tom Skerritt
- Music by: J. A. C. Redford
- Country of origin: United States
- Original language: English

Production
- Executive producer: Richard Welsh
- Cinematography: Eric van Haren Norman
- Editor: Jim Oliver
- Running time: 84 minutes
- Production company: Hallmark Hall of Fame Productions

Original release
- Network: CBS
- Release: November 23, 1997

What the Deaf Man Heard is a 1997 American comedy-drama television film directed by John Kent Harrison, written by Robert W. Lenski, and starring Matthew Modine and James Earl Jones. Based on the 1996 novel by G. D. Gearino, the film is about a man who pretends to be deaf-mute, becoming the keeper of a small town's secrets. It aired on CBS on November 23, 1997, as an episode of Hallmark Hall of Fame.

== Plot summary ==
In the 1940s, Helen Ayers and her young son Sammy board a bus in Birmingham, Alabama to move to a better life. Sammy's curious questions annoy Helen but she won't reveal the surprise and admonishes him to be silent, putting him to sleep. At a rest stop, Helen goes into a bar to get a drink but is dragged into a vacant lot and murdered as the bus leaves. Sammy sleeps through the night until the bus arrives at the end of the route, Barrington, Georgia.

When a despondent Sammy ignores him, the cynical bus driver believes he is deaf and abandoned by his mother. Norm Jenkins, the kindhearted terminal manager, takes an immediate liking to Sammy and is very protective, as is Lucille, the owner and cook at the terminal's cafe. Norm sees Sammy and Lucille as his surrogate son and wife as he had lost his own family to the influenza pandemic of 1918. Young Tolliver Tynan stops with his adopted sister, Tallasse, and mother, Maddie, to watch Sammy being questioned by the police chief and tries to spook Sammy by lighting a cherry bomb. Sammy sees Tolliver's activity in a reflection and steels himself to not react to the blast, which convinces the entire town that he is in fact deaf. Norm sets up Sammy to sleep in the storage room. Looking through Helen's suitcase left on the bus, Norm finds important documents.

Sammy spends the next two decades living in the terminal and working as the town's handyman, hearing various secrets from people who believe him to be deaf. Norm backtracks along the route of the bus and eventually tracks down Helen's cold case. Tallasse has returned after years away with dreams of becoming a professional photographer. Tolliver is still arrogant and patronizing as the treasurer of the town church. As his inheritance is tied up in a trust until his mother dies, he has various unsuccessful moneymaking schemes, all financed by funds he has embezzled from the church. Sammy hears all of Tolliver's secrets.

Black junk dealer Archibald Thacker and his sons masquerade as poor but are actually Harvard-educated businessmen as well as moonshine runners. They scheme to temporarily store a shipment of the liquor in the church's large, new baptismal font.

The Tynan house hosts the church's newly-ordained and unsure preacher, Reverend Pruitt. Seeing a newspaper article where a rock and roll group claimed to be bigger than God (inspired by Beatle John Lennon's "More popular than Jesus" remark), Pruitt is inspired to hold a record-burning event. The event grows out of control and gains a festive atmosphere. Embers from the bonfire ignite nearby fireworks, sending a skyrocket into the church and directly into the font full of alcohol, burning the church down.

Tolliver is put on trial for his embezzlement as the church is revealed to be uninsured. Sammy is called as the first witness and everyone is surprised when he speaks. Tolliver's mother collapses and dies from shock. Tolliver believes he is finally entitled to his inheritance. Norm reveals the notarized affidavit he found decades earlier in which Tolliver's father identifies Sammy as his illegitimate son by Helen, born just before Tolliver. As firstborn, Sammy is the legal heir to the Tynan fortune according to the terms of the will. Tolliver is sentenced to jail.

Sammy gives away much of his newfound wealth to charity as well as to Norm and Lucille. He boards a bus to begin exploring the country. Tallasse chases down the bus in her car and joins Sammy on his trip.

== Cast ==
- Matthew Modine as Sammy Ayers
  - Frankie Muniz as Young Sammy
- Claire Bloom as Maddie Tynan
- Judith Ivey as Lucille
- James Earl Jones as Archibald Thacker
- Jerry O'Connell as Reverend Perry Ray Pruitt
- Bernadette Peters as Helen Ayers
- Tom Skerritt as Norm Jenkins
- Anne Bobby as Tallasse Tynan
  - Hallee Hirsh as Young Tallasse
- Stephen Spinella as Percy
- Jake Weber as Tolliver Tynan
  - Tyler Noyes as Young Tolliver
- Andy Stahl as Finis
- Teagle F. Bougere as Abraham Thacker
- Lance Reddick as George Thacker

== Production ==
Filming took place in Wilmington, North Carolina.

== Reception ==
In her New York Times review, Caryn James wrote: "Nothing seems real in What the Deaf Man Heard. Instead, its soothing, storybook quality has Hallmark written all over it." Tony Scott gave it a more favorable review in Variety: "Primed with a quirky premise and by charmingly offbeat characters, penned by Robert W. Lenski, What the Deaf Man Heard is a joy."

The film was the highest-rated made-for-television film on any network since 1991 with approximately 36 million viewers.

The film received 1998 Emmy nominations for Outstanding Made for Television Movie and Outstanding Supporting Actress in a Miniseries or a Movie (Judith Ivey) and won for Outstanding Cinematography for a Miniseries or a Movie. It also received a Golden Globe nomination for Best Performance by an Actor in a Mini-Series or Motion Picture Made for TV (Matthew Modine).

== See also ==
- List of films featuring the deaf and hard of hearing
