= Uweza Foundation =

Kenyan non-profit organization

- Predecessor: Faces of Kibera
- Founded: 2008
- Area served: Kibera Slum, Nairobi, Kenya
- Key people: Rooney Mara
- Website: uwezakenya.org

The Uweza Foundation is a non-profit organization which works to promote human development in the Kibera slum of Nairobi, Kenya. It was founded in 2008 and is registered in the United States as a 501(c)3 organization. It is led by actress Rooney Mara.

Uweza is named after a Swahili word meaning opportunity, ability, and power.

== History ==
Uweza Foundation was established in 2008. Its founder had moved to the country and married a local man after visiting Kenya to volunteer at a children's home in the Kibera slum.

In January 2011, Uweza Foundation merged with Faces of Kibera, a charity founded by Rooney Mara. Faces of Kibera aimed to provide housing, food, and medical care for orphans by building an orphanage in the region. The charity received fundraising support from NFL teams under Mara's leadership. Mara had started the charity after she visited the area as a volunteer in 2006 and was moved to help the orphans, many of whom had lost parents to AIDS and HIV-related illnesses. She started her charity out of frustration with the growing number of nonprofits that she viewed as just business opportunities: "The people who need help aren't really getting it. So I started my own", she told Interview magazine in 2009. Uweza Foundation continues to be overseen by Mara who serves as president of its board of directors.

In 2022, Uweza Foundation collaborated with ROAM Gallery and Xtina Parks to showcase work by Kibera artists at the Museum of Contemporary Art in Massachusetts.

== Areas of focus ==
The foundation works to empower residents of Kibera, particularly women and youth, through educational programs with a particular focus on supporting the development of young artists and helping artists make a living by marketing their art. The foundation has focused to empower women and girls by tackling issues facing adolescent girls in Kibara. It also hosts a compound allowing students without electricity in their homes study outside of school and sponsors a youth soccer team.

== Uweza Gallery ==
As one of its activities, the foundation founded the Uweza Gallery in Olympic Estate, Kibera in 2012. The gallery features art by local talent and also incubates local emerging talents. It has allowed young artists to fund their education through art. The gallery was originally located in an old shipping container but moved in January 2019.

== Coronavirus pandemic ==
During the Coronavirus pandemic, Uweza cooperated with private-sector partners to form an initiative to promote sanitation in informal settlements such as Kibera and provide free artistic masks to residents designed by a local artist. The foundation also worked with artists from the Uweza Gallery to create informational murals to create awareness during the pandemic.
