= Rooney Mara =

American actress (born 1985)

- Mara in 2026
- Born: Patricia Rooney Mara; April 17, 1985 (age 41); Bedford, New York, U.S.
- Other name: Tricia Mara
- Education: New York University (BA)
- Occupation: Actress
- Years active: 2005–present
- Spouse: Joaquin Phoenix
- Children: 2
- Relatives: Kate Mara (sister)
- Family: Rooney; Mara
- Awards: Full list

Patricia Rooney Mara (/ˈmɛərə/ MAIR-ə; born April 17, 1985) is an American actress. Her accolades include the Cannes Film Festival Award for Best Actress, in addition to nominations for two Academy Awards, two Golden Globe Awards, and a British Academy Film Award.

Born into the Rooney and Mara families, Mara began her career acting in television and independent films, such as the coming-of-age drama Tanner Hall (2009). She first gained recognition for her supporting role in David Fincher's drama film The Social Network (2010). Mara had a career breakthrough when she starred as Lisbeth Salander in Fincher's thriller The Girl with the Dragon Tattoo (2011), which earned her a nomination for the Academy Award for Best Actress.

Mara's career progressed with leading roles in the thriller Side Effects (2013), the science fiction romance Her (2013), and the romantic drama Carol (2015). For the latter she won the Cannes Film Festival Award for Best Actress and received a nomination for the Academy Award for Best Supporting Actress. She has since appeared in the biographical drama Lion (2016), the supernatural drama A Ghost Story (2017), and portrayed the title character in the biblical drama Mary Magdalene (2018). Following a brief hiatus, Mara starred in the psychological thriller Nightmare Alley (2021) and the drama Women Talking (2022).

Mara is also known for her charity work and oversees the Uweza Foundation, which supports empowerment programs for children and families in the Kibera slum of Nairobi. She is also the founder of the vegan clothing line Hiraeth Collective.

== Early life and education ==
Mara was born on April 17, 1985, and raised in Bedford, New York, a town in Westchester County about 40 miles (64 km) north of New York City. Her mother's family founded the Pittsburgh Steelers and her father's family founded the New York Giants. Her father, Timothy Christopher Mara, is the senior vice president of player personnel for the New York Giants; and her mother, Kathleen McNulty (née Rooney), is a part-time real estate agent. She is the third of four children: she has an older brother, Daniel; an older sister, Kate, who is also an actress; and a younger brother, Conor.

Mara's father has Irish, German, and French-Canadian ancestry, and her mother is of Irish and Italian descent. Her Rooney ancestors originated in Newry, County Down. Her paternal grandparents were Ann Mara and Wellington Mara. Wellington was the long-time co-owner of the Giants, who was succeeded in that position by his son (Rooney Mara's uncle), John Mara. Rooney Mara's maternal grandfather, Timothy James "Tim" Rooney, has run Yonkers Raceway & Empire City Casino in Yonkers, New York since 1972. Mara is the great-granddaughter of both New York Giants founder Tim Mara and Pittsburgh Steelers founder Art Rooney, Sr., as well as of Kathleen McNulty Rooney. Her grand-uncle, Dan Rooney, was chairman of the Steelers, the former United States Ambassador to Ireland, the co-founder of The Ireland Funds charitable organization, and the architect of American Football's Rooney Rule. U.S. Representative Tom Rooney and former Florida State Representative Patrick Rooney Jr. are her cousins.

After graduating from Fox Lane High School in 2003, Mara went to Ecuador, Peru, and Bolivia in South America for four months as part of the Traveling School, an open learning environment. She attended George Washington University for a year before transferring to New York University's Gallatin School of Individualized Study, where she studied psychology, international social policy and nonprofits, graduating in 2010.

Mara was inspired to act by seeing musical theatre and classic movies, like Gone with the Wind (1939), Rebecca (1940), and Bringing Up Baby (1938), with her mother. She also wanted to be like her sister, Kate Mara, a professional actress. Mara resisted pursuing acting as a child, stating to The Journal News that "it never seemed that honorable to me, and I guess I was always afraid that I might fail." Her first and only role in high school was Juliet in Romeo and Juliet, which she got after being signed up to audition by a friend. Mara acted in a few student films while at NYU, and then began her career in acting, first auditioning at the age of nineteen.

== Career ==
=== 2005–2009: Early work ===
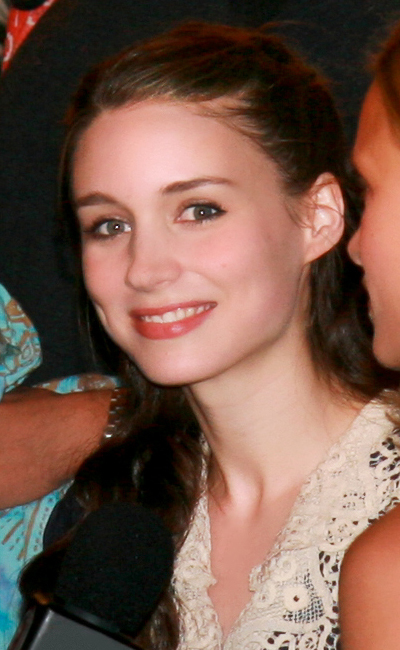
Mara at the 2009 Toronto International Film Festival

Mara first appeared as an extra in films which starred her sister, including a bit-part in the 2005 direct-to-video horror film Urban Legends: Bloody Mary. She found work in television, making her professional debut in a 2006 episode of the drama Law & Order: Special Victims Unit, as a girl who bullies overweight children. She guest-starred on the legal drama Women's Murder Club and played a drug addict in an episode of The Cleaner. Mara made her feature film debut Dream Boy (2008) and guest-starred as Megan for two episodes of NBC's ER.

In a coming-of-age film Tanner Hall (2009), Mara landed her first lead role, as Fernanda who has an affair with a married family friend (Tom Everett Scott). The film was the directorial debut of Tatiana von Fürstenberg and Francesca Gregorini, it debuted at the 2009 Toronto International Film Festival and had a limited theatrical release in September 2011. Mara dropped her first name, Patricia, to be known professionally by her middle name after working on the project. "I never really liked my first name," Mara stated to Paper magazine. "I never felt like a Tricia. And Rooney is more memorable". Her father and younger brother also go by their middle names.

In Miguel Arteta's comedy-drama film Youth in Revolt, Mara played Taggarty who tries to sleep with fifty men before she goes to college. The film was based on C.D. Payne's 1993 cult novel of the same name. Mara had auditioned for the starring role, but was offered the smaller part when the lead went to Portia Doubleday.

Mara played Courtney in the 2009 independent film Dare and in The Winning Season as Wendy, a high school basketball player having an affair with a middle-aged shoe salesman (Kevin Breznahan) with a similar story to The Bad News Bears. Both films were premiered at the 2009 Sundance Film Festival and Mara was included on Filmmaker magazine's list of "25 New Faces of Independent Film" that year.

Mara starred in a remake of the 1984 horror film A Nightmare on Elm Street, as the protagonist Nancy Holbrook, a high school student victimized by Freddy Krueger (Jackie Earle Haley). Mara began shooting the film in Chicago on May 5, 2009, directed by Samuel Bayer. Mara told Filmmaker that she felt that her Nancy was "completely different from the original" and "the loneliest girl in the world". Mara had signed on to continue her role if a sequel was made. She stated to Vogue that she disliked the experience of making the film so much, that it made her question if she wanted to be an actress. Mara appeared at the Hamptons International Film Festival in October 2009 as part of its Breakthrough Performers Program, where she was tutored by Sharon Stone.

=== 2010–2016: Breakthrough and critical acclaim ===
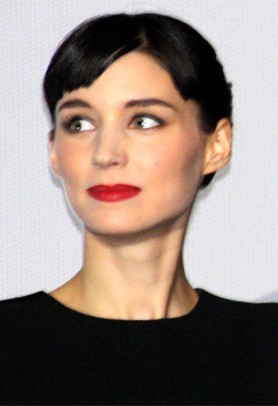
Mara at the French premiere of The Girl with the Dragon Tattoo in 2012

In 2010, Mara played Erica Albright, Mark Zuckerberg's ex-girlfriend, in David Fincher's biographical drama film The Social Network. The same year, Mara was cast as the lead in a film adaptation of The Girl with the Dragon Tattoo, the first of the Millennium book trilogy by Stieg Larsson. She played Lisbeth Salander, a brilliant but troubled computer hacker who helps journalist Mikael Blomkvist (Daniel Craig) solve a series of murders. Mara won the role over several other actresses after two and a half months of auditions and screen tests. David Fincher directed the film, with Scott Rudin producing. The Girl Who Played with Fire and The Girl Who Kicked the Hornets' Nest were planned to be adapted as well, depending on the film's box office performance. Fincher initially did not picture Mara as the character, but changed his mind after she auditioned. He convinced executives at Columbia Pictures to cast her for the part.

Fincher's The Girl with the Dragon Tattoo began shooting in Sweden in September 2010. Mara did not consider the film to be a remake, but another interpretation of the novel. She stated to Variety, "I plan on giving my interpretation of the character." Mara's long brown hair was cut short and dyed black, in a style reminiscent of 1970s punk and 1980s goth fashions. She also had her ears pierced four times, and had her brow and right nipple pierced for the role. Her nose and lip piercings were fake. She kept the nipple piercing so that it would not need to be re-pierced for a sequel. Mara's eyebrows were bleached, and she wore a temporary dragon tattoo. She began preparing for the role by starting to skateboard and kickbox, and underwent dialect and computer training. She also visited Stockholm, the setting of the novel. The film was released on December 20, 2011. Mara received universal critical acclaim and was nominated for the Golden Globe Award for Best Performance by an Actress in a Motion Picture – Drama for her performance. On January 24, 2012, she received her first nomination for the Academy Award for Best Actress.

In 2011, Mara was considered to star in Kathryn Bigelow's action film Zero Dark Thirty, but the role went to Jessica Chastain. The following year, Mara signed on to replace Carey Mulligan, who had to drop out due to scheduling conflicts, in Spike Jonze's Her (2013), where she played Catherine Klausen, the ex-wife of central character Theodore Twombley (Joaquin Phoenix). In addition, Mara starred in Steven Soderbergh's psychological thriller Side Effects (2013), replacing Blake Lively. The film also starred Jude Law, Channing Tatum, Catherine Zeta-Jones and Vinessa Shaw. She played Emily Taylor, "a woman who turns to prescription medication as a way of handling her anxiety concerning her husband's upcoming release from prison." She also starred in David Lowery's romantic crime drama Ain't Them Bodies Saints (2013), which was described as a modern-day Bonnie and Clyde story, alongside Casey Affleck and Ben Foster. The film premiered at the Sundance Film Festival in January 2013, where IFC Films purchased the rights for US distribution. In May 2013, she became the face of what was then a new Calvin Klein fragrance, Down Town.

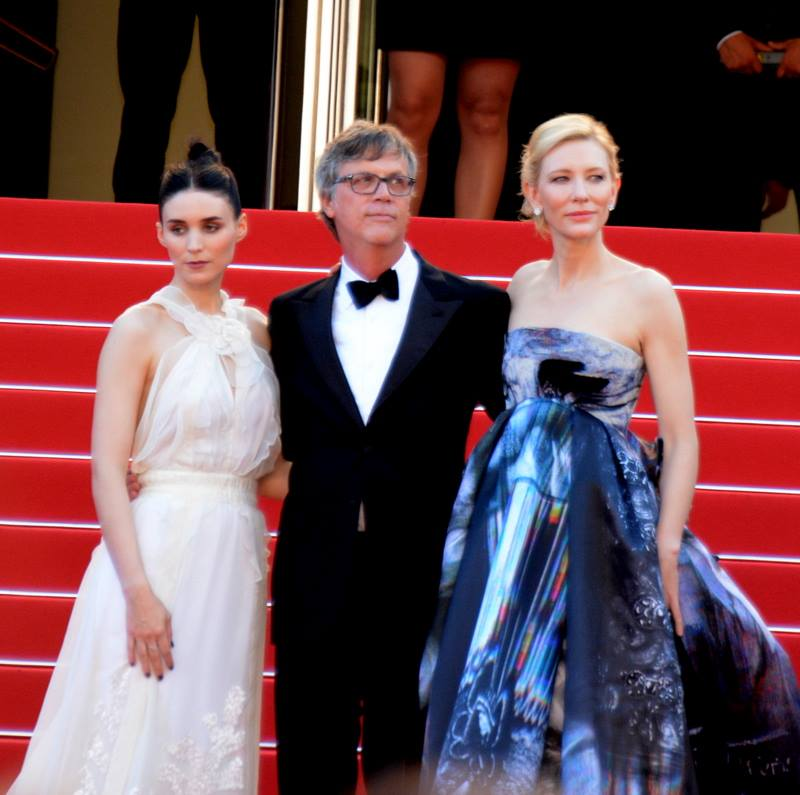
Mara attending the premiere of Carol with director Todd Haynes and Cate Blanchett at the 2015 Cannes Film Festival

Mara's sole release of 2014 was the crime drama thriller film Trash, an adaptation of the 2010 novel of the same name by Andy Mulligan directed by Stephen Daldry. The same year, Mara served as the costume designer on her then-boyfriend Charlie McDowell's feature directorial debut The One I Love. She was credited as Bree Daniel.

In 2015, Mara starred opposite Cate Blanchett in Todd Haynes's highly acclaimed film adaptation of Patricia Highsmith's The Price of Salt, Carol. The film premiered at the 2015 Cannes Film Festival, where it received a ten-minute standing ovation. She won the Cannes Film Festival Award for Best Actress for her role in the film, shared with Emmanuelle Bercot. Her performance garnered widespread critical acclaim and earned her nominations for an Academy Award, a Golden Globe Award, a British Academy Film Award and a Screen Actors Guild Award.

The same year, Mara played Tiger Lily in the Joe Wright-directed fantasy film Pan, a role for which she received a great deal of criticism; she and Wright faced accusations of "whitewashing" a Native American character. To express their concerns, Native American activists created a hashtag #NotYourTigerlily to protest Mara's casting and thousands of Native Americans participated in a "Twitterstorm" to share memes addressing their concerns about the portrayal of Native women in film. Mara would later apologize for her role in the film.

In 2016, Mara voiced The Sisters in the stop motion animated film Kubo and the Two Strings. She then starred alongside Ben Mendelsohn in Benedict Andrews' Una, which had its world premiere at the Telluride Film Festival on September 2, 2016. Mara next starred in Lion alongside Dev Patel and Nicole Kidman, and The Secret Scripture, directed by Jim Sheridan. The former was well-received by critics, with praise for the acting, emotion, visuals and cinematography. It received six Oscar nominations at the 89th Academy Awards, including Best Picture and Best Adapted Screenplay.

=== 2017–present: Hiatus and further film career ===
In 2017, Mara appeared in The Discovery, directed by Charlie McDowell, and A Ghost Story, with Casey Affleck, directed by David Lowery. Both had their world premieres at the 2017 Sundance Film Festival. Mara starred with Ryan Gosling, Natalie Portman, Cate Blanchett and Val Kilmer in Terrence Malick's Song to Song, which had a limited release.

Mara appeared in Don't Worry, He Won't Get Far on Foot, directed by Gus Van Sant, opposite Joaquin Phoenix, Jonah Hill and Jack Black. The film had its world premiere at the 2018 Sundance Film Festival. and was later released by Amazon Studios. That same year, Mara starred opposite Phoenix again in Mary Magdalene, written by Helen Edmundson and directed by Garth Davis. This same year, she also collaborated with Joaquin Phoenix, Sia, Sadie Sink and Kat von D to narrate Chris Delforce's animal rights documentary Dominion. For her contribution to the documentary, she was granted the 2018 Award of Excellence for Narration by Hollywood International Independent Documentary Awards.

Following a brief hiatus, Mara co-starred in the neo-noir psychological thriller Nightmare Alley (2021), an adaptation of the 1946 novel of the same name directed by Guillermo del Toro. The film received critical acclaim and was included in the Top 10 Films of the year by the American Film Institute Awards, but fared badly at the box office. It received four nominations at the 94th Academy Awards, including Best Picture. In 2022, Mara starred with Frances McDormand, Claire Foy, Jessie Buckley and Ben Whishaw in Sarah Polley's feature adaptation of Miriam Toews' bestselling novel Women Talking. In 2024, she starred in La cocina, an adaptation of Arnold Wesker's 1975 play The Kitchen directed by Alonso Ruizpalacios. She will also star in the upcoming film Bucking Fastard, directed by Werner Herzog, alongside her sister Kate Mara.

Mara is a signatory of the Film Workers for Palestine boycott pledge that was published in September 2025.

== Other work ==
In February 2018, it was announced Mara, Sara Schloat, and Chrys Wong had started a vegan clothing line named Hiraeth Collective, consisting of clothing, shoes, and accessories, designed by themselves. The clothing line is produced in Los Angeles, California. The clothing line was made available in select Barneys New York stores and online, beginning in August 2018.

Mara founded the charity Faces of Kibera, which aimed to provide housing, food, and medical care for orphans in Kibera, a slum in Nairobi, Kenya. The charity's goal was to build an orphanage in the region, for which 6 acres of land have been purchased. The charity auctioned memorabilia from the Steelers and Giants, as well as training camp events on eBay to raise money. She visited the area as a volunteer in 2006 and was moved to help the orphans, many of whom lost parents to AIDS and HIV-related illnesses. She began the charity due to her frustration with the growing number of nonprofits that are just business opportunities. "The people who need help aren't really getting it. So I started my own", she told Interview magazine in 2009. Mara later found it challenging to balance her charity work and acting career. "I need to do both; I can't just do acting," she stated to The Journal News. In January 2011, Faces of Kibera merged with Uweza Foundation which runs community-based empowerment programs in Kibera, including soccer leagues and after-school tutoring. Uweza is a Swahili word meaning opportunity, ability, and power. Mara serves as the president of the board of directors for the foundation.

== Personal life ==
Mara moved to Los Angeles in early 2007 and lived with her sister temporarily. Mara felt that the experience brought them closer together, and by 2010 they were regularly discussing the film business and movie scripts. In January 2012, Mara lived in the Los Feliz neighborhood of Los Angeles. She includes Gena Rowlands among the actresses who inspire her, especially her performances in A Woman Under the Influence (1974) and Opening Night (1977).

Mara is vegan. Since late 2016, she has been in a relationship with American actor Joaquin Phoenix, her co-star in Her (2013), Don't Worry, He Won't Get Far on Foot (2018), and Mary Magdalene (2018). As of September 2017, they reside in the Hollywood Hills with their two dogs, Soda and Oskar. They were engaged in 2019 and married some time after. Mara gave birth to their first child, a son, in August 2020. In June 2024, their daughter was born.

== Filmography ==
=== Film ===
Year	Title	Role	Notes	Ref.
2005	Urban Legends: Bloody Mary	Classroom Girl #1	As Patricia Mara	
2008	Dream Boy	Evelyn		
2009	Dare	Courtney		
2009	The Winning Season	Wendy Webber		
2009	Friends (With Benefits)	Tara		
2009	Youth in Revolt	Taggarty		
2009	Tanner Hall	Fernanda		
2010	A Nightmare on Elm Street	Nancy Holbrook		
2010	The Social Network	Erica Albright		
2011	The Girl with the Dragon Tattoo	Lisbeth Salander		
2013	Ain't Them Bodies Saints	Ruth Guthrie		
2013	Side Effects	Emily Taylor		
2013	Her	Catherine Klausen		
2014	Trash	Sister Olivia		
2015	Carol	Therese Belivet		
2015	Pan	Tiger Lily		
2016	Kubo and the Two Strings	Karasu / Washi	Voice roles	
2016	Una	Una Spencer		
2016	Lion	Lucy		
2016	The Secret Scripture	Roseanne "Rose" McNulty		
2017	The Discovery	Isla		
2017	A Ghost Story	M		
2017	Song to Song	Faye		
2018	Don't Worry, He Won't Get Far on Foot	Annu		
2018	Mary Magdalene	Mary Magdalene		
2018	Dominion	Narrator	Documentary	
2021	Nightmare Alley	Molly Cahill		
2022	Women Talking	Ona Friesen		
2024	La Cocina	Julia		
2025	The Voice of Hind Rajab	—N/a	Executive producer	
2026	Bucking Fastard	Joan Holbrooke		

=== Television ===
Year	Title	Role	Notes	Ref.
2006	Law & Order: Special Victims Unit	Jessica DeLay	Episode: "Fat"; credited as Tricia Mara	
2007	Women's Murder Club	Alexis Sherman	Episode: "Blind Dates and Bleeding Hearts"	
2008	The Cleaner	Rebecca Smith	Episode: "Rebecca"	
2009	ER	Megan	2 episodes	

== See also ==
- List of actors with Academy Award nominations
- List of actors with more than one Academy Award nomination in the acting categories
- List of animal rights advocates
- List of vegans
