= Women Talking (film) =

2022 film by Sarah Polley

- Theatrical release poster
- Directed by: Sarah Polley
- Screenplay by: Sarah Polley
- Based on: Women Talking by Miriam Toews
- Produced by: Dede Gardner; Jeremy Kleiner; Frances McDormand
- Starring: Rooney Mara; Claire Foy; Jessie Buckley; Judith Ivey; Ben Whishaw; Frances McDormand
- Cinematography: Luc Montpellier
- Edited by: Christopher Donaldson; Roslyn Kalloo
- Music by: Hildur Guðnadóttir
- Production companies: Orion Pictures; Plan B Entertainment; Hear/Say Productions
- Distributed by: United Artists Releasing
- Release dates: September 2, 2022 (Telluride); December 23, 2022 (United States)
- Running time: 104 minutes
- Country: United States
- Language: English
- Budget: $20 million
- Box office: $9.3 million

Women Talking is a 2022 American drama film written and directed by Sarah Polley. It is based on the 2018 novel by Miriam Toews, itself inspired by the gas-facilitated rapes that occurred at the Manitoba Colony, a remote and isolated Mennonite community in Bolivia. The film follows a group of Mennonite women who discuss their future after discovering the men have been raping the colony's women.

It features an ensemble cast that includes Rooney Mara, Claire Foy, Jessie Buckley, Judith Ivey, Ben Whishaw, and Frances McDormand, who also served as a producer on the film. It is the last film to be released by United Artists Releasing, before it was folded into MGM on March 4, 2023.

Women Talking premiered at the 49th Telluride Film Festival on September 2, 2022, and was released in the United States via select theaters on December 23, 2022, before a wide release on January 27, 2023, by United Artists Releasing. The film received positive reviews from critics, lauding Polley's screenplay and direction, the performances of the cast, and score, though it received some criticism for its message. It grossed just $9 million against a $20 million budget, making it a box-office bomb. It was named one of the top ten films of 2022 by the National Board of Review and the American Film Institute, and it won Best Adapted Screenplay at the Critics' Choice Awards, Writers Guild of America Awards, and the Academy Awards, where it was also nominated for Best Picture (Orion Pictures’ first film to be nominated for the award since The Silence of the Lambs).

== Plot ==
Set in 2010, the film opens with a young woman sleeping alone in bed who wakes to find bruises and wounds on her hips and upper inner thighs—injuries sustained from rape. The women and girls of her isolated Mennonite colony discover that the men have been using a livestock tranquilizer to subdue and rape them. The attackers are arrested and imprisoned in a nearby city. Most of the men of the colony travel to oversee the bail, leaving the women by themselves for two days to determine how they will proceed. They hold a plebiscite to decide whether to stay and do nothing, stay and fight, or leave.

The vote is tied between staying and fighting, and leaving. Eleven of the colony's women are chosen to come to a final decision and gather in a hayloft, though Scarface Janz, a woman in the "do nothing" camp, leaves the meeting after becoming disillusioned with the discussion, taking her hesitant daughter Anna and resistant granddaughter Helena with her. August, the colony's schoolteacher and one of the only remaining men, joins the women to record the meeting, as none of the women were taught to read or write.

Salome, just back from a trip to gather antibiotics to treat her assaulted four-year-old daughter, remains adamant about staying and fighting, an opinion shared by Mejal. Ona, who is pregnant after being raped, also suggests that they stay and, after winning the fight, create a new set of rules for the colony that would give the women equality. Mariche, Greta's daughter and Autje's mother, disagrees, believing that forgiveness is the only viable option. To defuse the conflict, Ona suggests that August create one document stating the pros and cons of leaving, and another document with those for staying.

The meeting is adjourned. During the break, it is revealed that August is from an excommunicated family, but was recently granted permission to return and teach the boys of the colony. He and Ona were good friends in childhood, and he has had romantic feelings for her since, but she tells him she cannot marry him as she believes that she would cease to be her true self, the person he loves, if she marries.

When some of the women go outside to be counted for the 2010 census, they learn that Klaas, Mariche's abusive husband, will return that evening to collect more bail money. The meeting resumes. Ona and Mejal change their minds in favor of leaving. Salome remains insistent upon fighting, angrily confessing that she would rather kill the men than put her daughter at risk any longer. However, she changes her opinion after being reminded by Agata, her and Ona's mother, of the principles of their faith. The only one remaining unconvinced is Mariche. An argument ensues between her and the rest of the women; it is revealed that she forgave her husband's abuse at Greta's urging. After Greta apologizes, Mariche agrees to leave.

Their reasons for leaving are transcribed by August: to ensure the safety of their children, to be steadfast in their faith, and to have freedom of thought. They decide to try to take boys aged fifteen years and younger with them, but will not force any boy over age twelve. They prepare to leave at sunrise, concealing their plans from Klaas. August, at Ona's behest, posts the documents stating the pros and cons of leaving and staying on the walls as an "artifact" of the women's time in the colony. He also declares his love to Ona and gives her a map for the women to use.

Before they can leave, Melvin (formerly Nettie), a transgender man who is selectively mute after an incestuous rape, speaking only to the colony's children, tells Salome that her teenage son Aaron has fled and hidden. He is found, but cannot be convinced to leave in enough time. Salome, breaking the rules the women set, sprays Aaron with tranquilizer, forcing him to leave with them. She reveals this only to August, who understands and does not question her. He asks her to look after Ona, and reveals his intent to kill himself once the women are gone. She instead asks him to teach the boys properly to prevent any further violence and to give him purpose. Helena and Anna join the rest of the women, while Janz and August watch as they depart. Sometime later, Ona's newborn baby is shown, and Autje is heard saying that it will live a life very different from the one the women endured.

== Cast ==
- Rooney Mara as Ona Friesen
- Claire Foy as Salome Friesen
- Jessie Buckley as Mariche Loewen
- Judith Ivey as Agata Friesen
- Sheila McCarthy as Greta Loewen
- Michelle McLeod as Mejal Loewen
- Kate Hallett as Autje Loewen
- Liv McNeil as Neitje Friesen
- August Winter as Melvin Gerbrandt
- Ben Whishaw as August Epp
- Frances McDormand as Scarface Janz
- Kira Guloien as Anna
- Shayla Brown as Helena
- Nathaniel McParland as Aaron
- Eli Ham as Klaas
- Emily Mitchell as Miep

== Production ==
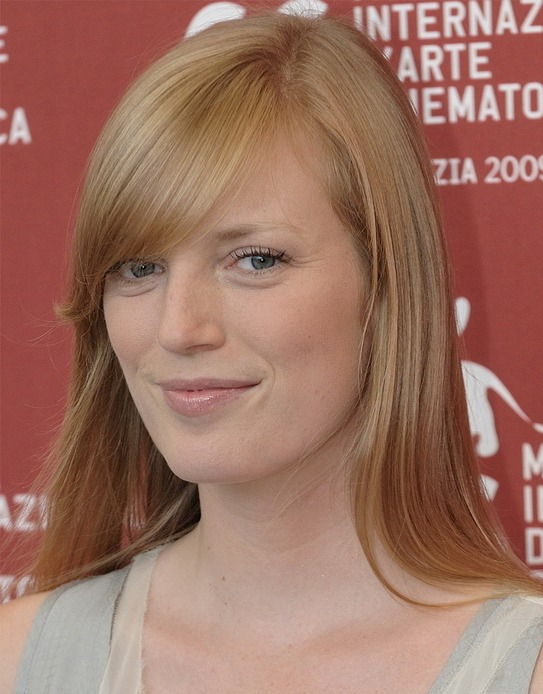
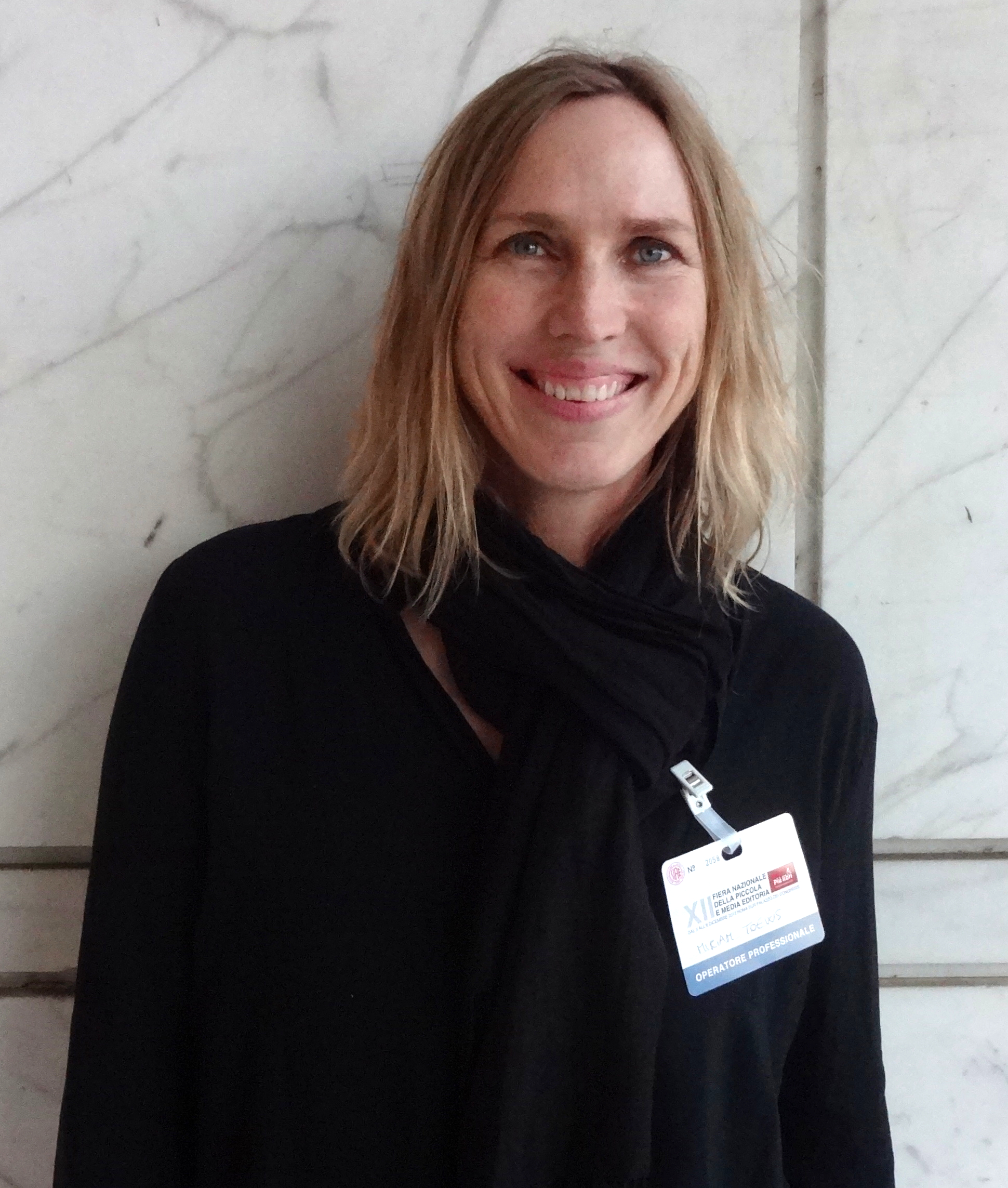
Director and screenwriter Sarah Polley (left), actress and co-producer Frances McDormand, and author of the novel Miriam Toews

In December 2020, it was reported that Frances McDormand would star in the film, which would be written and directed by Sarah Polley. In June 2021, Ben Whishaw, Rooney Mara, Claire Foy, Jessie Buckley, Judith Ivey, Sheila McCarthy and Michelle McLeod joined the cast of the film. Hildur Guðnadóttir composed the film's score.

Principal photography took place from July 19 to September 10, 2021 in Toronto with COVID-19 safety precautions in place. Costume designer Quita Alfred procured some fabric and prayer coverings from an actual Mennonite community store, using differing colors and patterns for each family to represent certain traits they held as a unit. Alfred noted that "trying to convince world-class actresses to wear long-sleeve polyester dresses in 110 degree heat was a challenge." However, she stressed that the dresses weren't as uncomfortable as one might think. "I tried them on to see how uncomfortable the cast would be. I actually came to love them. They’re so practical, but the lack of pockets is an issue for me." Women Talking is the last film released by United Artists Releasing before Amazon folded it into Orion's parent company, Metro-Goldwyn-Mayer.

=== Music ===
Hildur Guðnadóttir composed the film's score, with Skúli Sverrisson providing guitar solos. The soundtrack was among the inaugural titles released through Universal Music Group's label Mercury Classics Soundtrack & Score, which released this film's soundtrack digitally on December 23, 2022, the same day as the start of the film's limited theatrical release. It was released on physical CD later that month. The score cue "Speak Up," which served as the basis for the film's trailer music, was released digitally on November 4, 2022. The 1967 song "Daydream Believer" performed by The Monkees was featured in the film; however, it is not included on the soundtrack.

== Release ==
The film had its world premiere at the Telluride Film Festival on September 2, 2022. It screened at the 2022 Toronto International Film Festival on September 13, 2022; at the 60th New York Film Festival on October 10, 2022; and at the 2022 AFI Fest on November 5, 2022.

It began its limited theatrical release in the United States and Canada on December 23, 2022, by Orion Pictures (through United Artists Releasing), with a wide expansion on January 27, 2023. It was originally scheduled for a limited release on December 2, 2022, but was moved to December 23 to avoid competition with Avatar: The Way of Water. The film was released for VOD on February 21, 2023 and then on Blu-ray and DVD on March 7.

== Reception ==
=== Box office ===
Women Talking grossed $5.5 million in the United States and Canada, and $3.8 million in other territories, for a worldwide total of $9.3 million. On the first weekend of its limited theatrical release, it grossed $40,530 from 8 theaters, making it the worst platform opening of the year. In Deadline Hollywood, United Artists Releasing cited the proximity of Christmas and the nationwide impact of Winter Storm Elliott as contributing factors.

It expanded to 707 theatres in the nationwide expansion, grossing $970,469 with a $1,372 average at the box office until it dropped out on its nationwide second weekend with $558,071, finishing fifteenth twice. After the Academy Award nominations were announced, the film had a 164% boost in grosses.

=== Critical response ===
On the review aggregator website Rotten Tomatoes, the film holds an approval rating of 90%, based on 296 reviews, with an average rating of 8/10. The site's critics consensus reads: "While Women Talking sometimes forsakes entertaining drama in favor of simply getting its points across, its message is valuable-and effectively delivered." On Metacritic, the film has a weighted average score of 77 out of 100, based on 47 critics, indicating "generally favorable reviews".

After a Telluride Film Festival premiere of the movie, Peter Debruge from Variety wrote that the film is a "powerful act of nonviolent protest". Justin Chang of the Los Angeles Times said it is "a movie that deliberately hovers between drama and parable, the materially concrete and the spiritually abstract, and whose stark austerity sometimes gives way to bursts of salty wit and cathartic laughter". A. O. Scott from The New York Times called the film "a timely political parable with a stellar ensemble cast". He also described the film as "plain-spoken almost to the point of artlessness and turns out to be as layered and whorled as a hand-woven tapestry". Mae Abdulbaki of Screen Rant gave the film 3.5 out of 5 stars, calling it a "riveting adaptation" with "great" and "phenomenal" performances. She also wrote that the film "tackles a difficult subject with thoughtful sensitivity, levity, and spirited discussion that will leave audiences thinking about the film and its central premise for a long time after it's over".

In July 2023, CBR ranked it as the "Best Indie Film of the 2020s (So Far)," saying that the film achieved its goals thanks to "its story and the message it sends to those in similar situations." In August 2023, Collider ranked the film at No. 10 on its list of "The 20 Best Drama Movies of the 2020s So Far," writing that "While it doesn’t seem like a series of conversations would make for an engaging film, director Sarah Polley ensures that each character is defined by much more than a talking point."

== Accolades ==
Polley won the Telluride Film Festival Silver Medallion Tribute Award. Composer Hildur Guðnadóttir received a Tribute Award at the 2022 Toronto International Film Festival. At the 95th Academy Awards, the film was nominated for Best Picture with Polley winning for Best Adapted Screenplay. It was nominated for Best Screenplay and Best Original Score at the 80th Golden Globe Awards, Best Ensemble Cast of a Motion Picture at the 29th Screen Actors Guild Awards. It received six nominations at the 28th Critics' Choice Awards including Best Picture and won Best Adapted Screenplay. The film also received three nominations at the 38th Independent Spirit Awards and was the recipient of the Robert Altman Award, which is given to the film's director, casting director and ensemble cast. Women Talking was a nominee for Best Direction in a Feature Film at the 2023 Directors Guild of Canada awards.
