= Manitoba Colony, Bolivia =

Ultraconservative Mennonite community

Manitoba Colony is an ultraconservative Mennonite community in the Santa Cruz Department or eastern lowlands of Bolivia. Conservative plain dress Old Colony Mennonites from Mexico and Canada began moving to Bolivia in the 1960s. Manitoba Colony, one of dozens of Mennonite colonies in Bolivia, was founded in 1991 and named after a much larger colony in Mexico, which in turn has its origins in the Canadian province of Manitoba. The colony has a population of approximately 2,000. Members of the colony speak Plautdietsch, dress plainly and do not use electricity or automobiles.

== Serial rape case ==
Between 2005 and 2009, 151 women and girls (including small children) in Manitoba Colony were raped at night in their homes by a group of colony men who sedated them with animal anesthetic. The victims were between three and 65 years old and included a woman with an intellectual disability and a pregnant woman, whose attack caused her to deliver prematurely. Peter Weiber, a veterinarian from a neighboring colony, provided the anesthetic in spray form, and sold it to the perpetrators who then sprayed the drug through open windows, sedating the entire household. Girls and women reported waking up bruised and bloodied, but the reports were at first dismissed as "wild female imagination," or else attributed to an "act of the devil" or demons. Eventually a group of colony men were caught in the act. The colony elders, deciding that the case was too difficult to handle themselves, called local police to take the perpetrators into custody in 2011.

Eight men stood trial in August 2011, and seven were sentenced to 25 years in prison for rape. Additionally, Peter Weiber was given a 12 year sentence for supplying the drug used to debilitate the victims and for his knowledge of the role of that drug in the attacks. He has since been conditionally released. A further two men were tried and convicted in connected trials.

=== In popular culture ===
A fictional version of Manitoba Colony appears in Miriam Toews's 2018 novel, Women Talking. The novel, which Toews describes as a "reaction through fiction," imagines a group of colony women gathering secretly to discuss the nighttime attacks they have suffered, and to decide on a course of action. An eponymous film adaptation of the book by Sarah Polley was released in 2022.
