= Judith Ivey =

American actress and theatre director (born 1951)

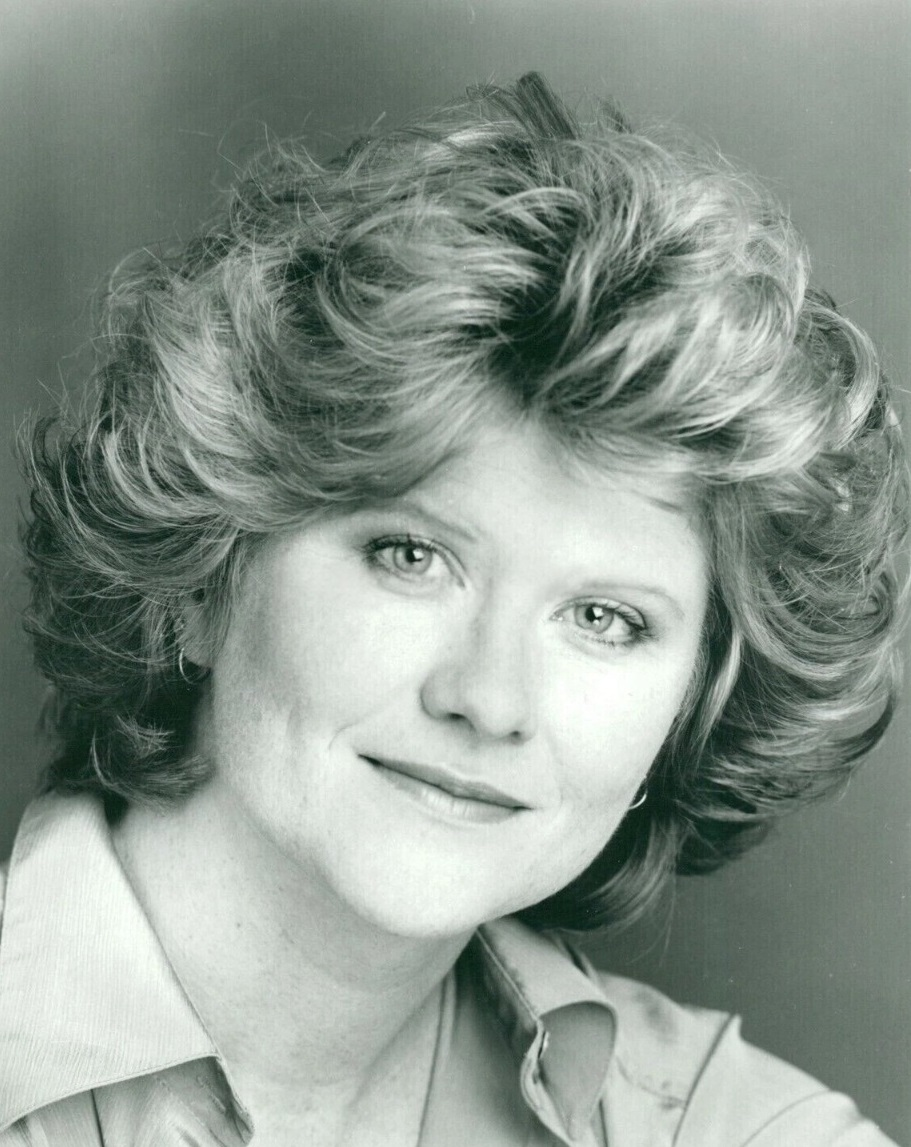
- Born: Judith Lee Ivey; September 4, 1951 (age 75); El Paso, Texas, U.S.
- Education: Illinois State University
- Occupations: Actress; theatre director
- Years active: 1974–present
- Spouses: Ricardo Gutierrez (m. 1973; div. 1978) Tim Braine (m. 1989)
- Children: 2

Judith Lee Ivey (born September 4, 1951) is an American actress and theatre director. She has twice won the Tony Award for Best Featured Actress in a Play for Steaming (1981) and Hurlyburly (1984). She also received Best Actress In A Play nomination for Park Your Car in Harvard Yard (1992) and another Best Featured Actress in a Play nomination for The Heiress. Ivey made her big screen debut playing the female lead role in the 1984 romantic comedy film, The Lonely Guy. She later appeared in the comedy films The Woman in Red (1984), Compromising Positions (1985), Brighton Beach Memoirs (1986), Sister, Sister (1987), and the drama films The Devil's Advocate (1997) and Women Talking (2022), for which she received critical acclaim. On television, Ivey played the leading role in the NBC sitcom Down Home (1990-91), and played Bonnie Jean "BJ" Poteet during the final season of CBS sitcom Designing Women (1992-93). For her role in the television film What the Deaf Man Heard (1997), she was nominated for a Primetime Emmy Award for Outstanding Supporting Actress in a Limited Series or Movie.

== Early life and education ==
Judith Lee Ivey was born on September 4, 1951, in El Paso, Texas, the daughter of Nathan Aldean Ivey, a college instructor and dean, and Dorothy Lee (née Lewis; 1922—2023), a teacher.

From 1965 to 1968, she attended Union High School through tenth grade in Dowagiac, Michigan. She graduated from Marion High School in Marion, Illinois, in 1970, and then attended John A. Logan College, Southern Illinois University (Carbondale), and Illinois State University in Normal, Illinois.

== Career ==
Ivey won two Tony Awards as Best Featured Actress in a Play for Steaming in 1983 and Hurlyburly in 1985. She was nominated for Park Your Car in Harvard Yard in 1992 and a revival of The Heiress in 2013. Other Broadway theatre credits include Piaf, Bedroom Farce, Blithe Spirit, Voices in the Dark, and Follies.

She portrayed Amanda in The Glass Menagerie at the Long Wharf Theatre and reprised the role in March 2010 at the Roundabout Theatre in New York, as well as the Mark Taper Forum in Los Angeles. She received the Lucille Lortel Award for Best Actress for that portrayal. Ivey portrayed Ann Landers in the solo play The Lady with All the Answers at the Cherry Lane Theatre (off-Broadway) in October 2009. She was nominated for Best Solo Performance for the Lucille Lortel Award and Drama Desk Award. In 2016, she returned to the Cherry Lane Theatre in Israel Horovitz's play Out of the Mouths of Babes with Estelle Parsons, directed by Barnet Kellman.

Ivey has appeared in numerous films, including Brighton Beach Memoirs, Miles from Home, Compromising Positions, Harry & Son, The Woman in Red, Sister, Sister, In Country, Hello Again, The Lonely Guy, There Goes the Neighborhood, The Devil's Advocate, What Alice Found, and Flags of Our Fathers.

Despite a long history of theater and film performances, Ivey most associated with the role of B.J. Poteet in the final season of Designing Women. She appeared on Will & Grace as the mother of Dr. Leo Markus and appeared on Grey's Anatomy, Person of Interest, White Collar, Nurse Jackie, Big Love, and Law & Order: Special Victims Unit.

Ivey played the lead role of Kate McCrorey in the two-season series Down Home (1990–1991), set in a Texas coastal town. This was followed by lead roles in single season series The 5 Mrs. Buchanans (1994-1995, "Alexandria Buchanan"), and Dave Chappelle's Buddies (1996, "Maureen DeMoss"). Ivey was also in the 1985 TV remake of The Long Hot Summer, in the role of Noel Varner (Joanne Woodward's role in the 1958 film version). The miniseries also starred Jason Robards and Don Johnson. Ivey was nominated for an Emmy for her performance in What the Deaf Man Heard, a Hallmark Hall of Fame presentation. She also provided the voice of Eleanor Sherman in the animated series The Critic. Ivey appeared in the television miniseries Rose Red (with a screenplay by Stephen King) as Cathy, one of the psychics investigating a haunted house.

== Personal life ==
As a student at Illinois State, she majored in drama and later did commercials and steady repertory work in Chicago. Ivey met and married Illinois State graduate student, Ricardo Gutierrez in 1973. They divorced and she moved to New York in 1978. She is now married to Tim Braine, and they have two children.

== Filmography ==
=== Film ===
Year	Title	Role	Notes
1984	The Lonely Guy	Iris	
1984	Harry & Son	Sally	
1984	The Woman in Red	Didi Pierce	
1985	Compromising Positions	Nancy Miller	
1986	Brighton Beach Memoirs	Blanche	
1987	Sister, Sister	Charlotte Bonnard	
1987	Hello Again	Zelda	
1988	Miles from Home	Frances	
1989	In Country	Anita	
1990	Everybody Wins	Connie	
1990	Love Hurts	Susan Volcheck	
1990	Alice	Gossiping Matron	uncredited
1992	There Goes the Neighborhood	Peedi Rutledge	
1997	Washington Square	Aunt Elizabeth Almond	
1997	The Devil's Advocate	Mrs. Alice Lomax	
1997	A Life Less Ordinary	Celine's Mom	
1998	Without Limits	Barbara Bowerman	
1999	Mystery, Alaska	Joanne Burns	
1999	The Stand-In	Mrs. Rosensweig	
2003	What Alice Found	Sandra	
2006	Flags of Our Fathers	Belle Block	
2010	The Glass Menagerie	Amanda Wingfield	direct-to-video
2011	A Bird of the Air	Eleanor Reeves	
2014	Big Stone Gap	Nan MacChesney	
2017	Cortez	Sandy	
2018	The Bit Player	Betty Shannon	documentary
2020	Through the Glass Darkly	Mama Carmichael	
2022	Women Talking	Agata Friesen	Vancouver Film Critics Circle Award for Best Supporting Female Actor in a Canadian Film; AARP Movies for Grownups Award for Best Supporting Actress; Independent Spirit Robert Altman AwardNational Board of Review Award for Best Cast; Boston Society of Film Critics Award for Best Cast; St. Louis Gateway Film Critics Association Award for Best Ensemble; Nominated—Screen Actors Guild Award for Outstanding Performance by a Cast in a Motion Picture

=== Television ===
Year	Title	Role	Notes
1980	Search for Tomorrow	Marilyn	3 episodes
1982	American Playhouse	Louise	Episode: "The Shady Hill Kidnapping"
1982	Cagney & Lacey	Gwen	Episode: "Mr. Lonelyhearts"
1983	Dixie: Changing Habits	Sister Margaret	TV movie
1984	Piaf	Madeline	TV movie
1985	The Long Hot Summer	Noel Varner	TV movie
1987	We Are the Children	Brenda Hayes	TV movie
1990	Decoration Day	Terry Novis	TV movie
1990–1991	Down Home	Kate McCrorey	19 episodes
1992	Her Final Fury: Betty Broderick, the Last Chapter	Dist. Atty. Kerry Wells	TV movie
1992	Do Not Bring That Python in the House	Mrs. Miller	TV movie
1992–1993	Designing Women	B.J. Poteet	22 episodes
1993	Frogs!	Passionatta	TV movie
1993	Frasier	Lorraine (voice only)	Episode: "I Hate Frasier Crane"
1993	CBS Schoolbreak Special	Counselor	Episode: "Other Mothers"
1994	Duckman	Mother Mirabelle	Episode: "T.V. or Not to Be"
1994	On Promised Land	Olivia	TV movie
1994–1995	The 5 Mrs. Buchanans	Alexandria Buchanan	17 episodes
1994–1995	The Critic	Eleanor Sherman	23 episodes
1995	Almost Golden: The Jessica Savitch Story	Laura McCormick	TV movie
1996	Buddies	Maureen DeMoss	14 episodes
1996	The Summer of Ben Tyler	Narrator	TV movie
1997	What the Deaf Man Heard	Lucille	Nominated — Primetime Emmy Award for Outstanding Supporting Actress in a Limited Series or Movie
1999	Half a Dozen Babies	Doris Stauffer	TV movie
2002	Rose Red	Cathy Kramer	3 episodes
2002	Will & Grace	Eleanor Markus	3 episodes
2003	Queens Supreme	Susan Kelly	Episode: "Mad About You"
2005	Related	Bob's Mom	Episode: "Have Yourself a Sorelli Little Christmas"
2005, 2013	Law & Order: Special Victims Unit	Alice Parker / Jenny's Attorney	2 episodes
2007	Pictures of Hollis Woods	Beatrice Gilcrest	TV movie
2009	Nurse Jackie	Paula	Episode: "Tiny Bubbles"
2010	Past Life	Laney	2 episodes
2010	The Whole Truth	Bernadette Peale	Episode: "Liars"
2011	Big Love	Renee Clayton	Episode: "D.I.V.O.R.C.E."
2011	Grey's Anatomy	Barbara Robbins	Episode: "White Wedding"
2012	Person of Interest	Sharon	Episode: "Many Happy Returns"
2012	White Collar	Ellen Parker	5 episodes
2012	Modern Love	Molly McElvane	TV movie
2013	Assistance	Susan Johnson	TV movie
2014	Elementary	Ruth Colville	Episode: "The Many Mouths of Aaron Colville"
2016	The Family	Mrs. Asher	4 episodes
2017	Bloodline	Belle's Mother	Episode: "Part 27"
2018	Instinct	Social Worker Sheila	Episode: "Tribal"
2019	New Amsterdam	Dr. Virginia Stauton	4 episodes
2024	Sweet Magnolias	Bonnie Townsend	4 episodes
2026	Best Medicine	Vanessa Best	season 1 episode 9 "Doc Martin"

=== Stage ===
Year	Title	Role	Notes	Ref.
1979	Bedroom Farce	Kate (Replacement)	Brooks Atkinson Theatre, Broadway	
1981	Piaf	Madeleine	Plymouth Theatre, Broadway	
1982	Steaming	Josie	Brooks Atkinson Theatre, Broadway	
1984	Hurlyburly	Bonnie	Ethel Barrymore Theatre, Broadway	
1986	Precious Sons	Bea	Longacre Theatre, Broadway	
1987	Blithe Spirit	Ruth	Neil Simon Theatre, Broadway	
1991	Park Your Car in Harvard Yard	Kathleen Hogan	Music Box Theatre, Broadway	
1999	Voices in the Dark	Lil	Longacre Theatre, Broadway	
2001	Follies	Sally Durant Plummer	Belasco Theatre, Broadway	
2009	The Lady With All the Answers	Ann Landers	Cherry Lane Theatre, Off-Broadway	
2010	The Glass Menagerie	Amanda Wingfield	Laura Pels Theatre, Off-Broadway	
2012	The Heiress	Lavinia Penniman	Walter Kerr Theatre, Broadway	
2015	The Audience	Margaret Thatcher	Gerald Schoenfeld Theatre, Broadway	
2016	Out of the Mouths of Babes	Evvie	Cherry Lane Theatre, Off-Broadway	
2017	Fireflies	Grace Bodell	Long Wharf Theater	
2019	Greater Clements	Maggie	Lincoln Center Theatre, Off-Broadway	
