= Georgia Toews =

Canadian writer (born 1990)

- Born: April 20, 1990 (age 36); Winnipeg, Manitoba, Canada
- Education: Humber College
- Occupation: Novelist
- Spouse: Mark Boucher
- Parent(s): Miriam Toews; Neal Rempel
- Writing career
- Notable works: Hey, Good Luck Out There (2022)

Georgia Elvira Toews (/ˈteɪvz/, born April 20, 1990) is a Canadian novelist based in Toronto.

Toews' debut novel, Hey, Good Luck Out There (2022), humorously recounts the author's struggle with addiction, recovery, and apartment-hunting during her late teens and early twenties. In her second novel, Nobody Asked for This (2025), Toews examines her young adulthood and tests the limits of humor itself through the lens of a wryly observant stand-up comedian named Virginia Woolard.

Toews is frequently depicted in novels by her mother, author Miriam Toews, including as the teenage character Nora Von Riesen, whose "archly lacerating exchanges" with her mother permeate All My Puny Sorrows (2014, adapted for film in 2021).

== Education ==
Toews was educated at Humber College.

== Bibliography ==
- Nobody Asked for This (Toronto: Doubleday Canada, 2025), ISBN 9780385700078
- Hey, Good Luck Out There (Toronto: Doubleday Canada, 2022), ISBN 038569671X
