= Anne with an E =

Canadian drama television series

- A title card for Anne with an E
- Also known as: Anne
- Genre: Period drama; Coming-of-age
- Created by: Moira Walley-Beckett
- Based on: Anne of Green Gables by Lucy Maud Montgomery
- Screenplay by: Moira Walley-Beckett
- Starring: Amybeth McNulty; Geraldine James; Dalila Bela; Lucas Jade Zumann; Aymeric Jett Montaz; R. H. Thomson; Corrine Koslo; Dalmar Abuzeid; Cory Grüter-Andrew; Joanna Douglas; Ashleigh Stewart
- Opening theme: "Ahead by a Century" by the Tragically Hip
- Composers: Amin Bhatia; Ari Posner
- Countries of origin: Canada; United States
- Original language: English
- No. of seasons: 3
- No. of episodes: 27

Production
- Executive producers: Elizabeth Bradley; Alex Sapot; Sally Catto; Debra Hayward; Alison Owen; Miranda de Pencier; Moira Walley-Beckett; Ken Girotti
- Producers: Susan Murdoch; John Calvert
- Production location: Canada
- Cinematography: Bobby Shore
- Running time: 44 minutes
- Production companies: Pelican Ballet; Northwood Entertainment

Original release
- Network: CBC Television; Netflix
- Release: March 19, 2017 – November 24, 2019

Anne with an E (initially titled Anne for its first season within Canada) is a Canadian period drama television series loosely adapted from Lucy Maud Montgomery's 1908 classic work of children's literature, Anne of Green Gables. It was created by Moira Walley-Beckett for CBC and Netflix; it stars Amybeth McNulty as orphan Anne Shirley, Geraldine James as Marilla Cuthbert, R. H. Thomson as Matthew Cuthbert, Dalila Bela as Diana Barry, and Lucas Jade Zumann as Gilbert Blythe.

The series premiered on March 19, 2017, on CBC and on May 12 internationally on Netflix. It was renewed for a second season in August 2017 and for a third season in August 2018. Shortly after the third season was released in 2019, CBC and Netflix announced the series had been cancelled.

Anne with an E received positive reviews and won Canadian Screen Award for Best Dramatic Series in both 2017 and 2018. The series tackles a range of issues like helping orphans, child abandonment, psychological trauma, social issues such as conformity, gender inequality, racism, religion, homosexuality, bullying, and freedom of speech.

== Synopsis ==
In 1896, elderly unmarried siblings Matthew and Marilla Cuthbert decide to adopt an orphan boy to help out around their ancestral farm of Green Gables, on the outskirts of the fictional Canadian town of Avonlea, Prince Edward Island. When Matthew goes to pick the child up at the railway station, he finds 13-year-old Anne Shirley, an imaginative, bright, high-spirited, and talkative girl, instead. Anne was orphaned when her parents died when she was a few months old, and had lived as a servant in various households before being placed in an orphanage.

While Matthew decides he would like her to stay, Marilla does not trust Anne, given her status as an unknown orphan and the perceived uselessness of a young girl on the farm. Her distrust appears confirmed when Marilla cannot locate a brooch, thus leading her to believe that Anne is a thief. The Cuthberts send her away, thus "returning" her to the orphanage. While she does arrive back at the orphanage, she is terrified to enter, haunted by the bullying she had endured there, and returns to the train station. Meanwhile, Marilla discovers that the brooch had been misplaced rather than stolen and she realizes that Anne is not a thief. Matthew consequently finds Anne and convinces her to return to Green Gables, where she is officially made part of their family. However, Anne continues to face bullying from students in the Avonlea school and class-based discrimination from Diana's parents and others in the community. Anne again returns and attempts to gain acceptance from the rest of Avonlea using her survival mechanisms of intelligence, problem-solving abilities, and imagination.

== Cast ==
=== Main ===
- Amybeth McNulty as Anne Shirley (later Anne Shirley-Cuthbert)
- Geraldine James as Marilla Cuthbert
- Dalila Bela as Diana Barry
- Lucas Jade Zumann as Gilbert Blythe
- Aymeric Jett Montaz as Jerry Baynard
- R. H. Thomson as Matthew Cuthbert
- Corrine Koslo as Rachel Lynde (seasons 2–3; recurring season 1)
- Dalmar Abuzeid as Sebastian "Bash" Lacroix (seasons 2–3)
- Cory Grüter-Andrew as Cole Mackenzie (seasons 2–3)
- Joanna Douglas as Miss Muriel Stacy (season 3; recurring season 2)
- Ashleigh Stewart as Winifred "Winnie" Rose (season 3)

=== Recurring and guest ===
- Jonathan Holmes as Mr. William Barry
- Helen Johns as Mrs. Eliza Barry
- Ryan Kiera Armstrong as Minnie May Barry
- Deborah Grover as Josephine Barry
- Wayne Best as John Blythe
- Phillip Williams as Thomas Lynde
- David Ingram as Mr. Harmon Andrews
- Janet Porter as Mrs. Andrews
- Christian Martyn as Billy Andrews
- Lia Pappas-Kemps as Jane Andrews
- Ella Jonas Farlinger as Priscilla "Prissy" Andrews
- Jim Annan as Mr. Gillis
- Fiona Byrne as Mrs. Gillis
- Kyla Matthews as Ruby Gillis
- Jacob Ursomarzo as Moody Spurgeon
- Stephen Tracey as Mr. Phillips
- Miranda McKeon as Josie Pye
- Glenna Walters as Tillie Boulter
- Katelyn Wells as Mary Joe
- Jacob Horsley as Charlie Sloane
- Taras Lavren as Nathaniel "Nate"
- Shane Carty as Mr. Dunlop
- Cara Ricketts as Mary Hanford-Lacroix
- Araya Mengesha as Elijah Hanford
- Nicky Lawrence as Jocelyn
- Lisa Codrington as Constance
- Melanie Nicholls-King as Hazel Lacroix
- Kiawenti:io Tarbell as Ka'kwet
- Brandon Oakes as Aluk
- Dana Jeffrey as Oqwatnuk
- Ian D. Clark as Stationmaster
- Andrew Shaver as Mr. Baynard
- Sophie Goulet as Mrs. Lisette Baynard
- Aidan Chase as Alexandre Baynard
- Ines Feghouli as Sandie Baynard
- Ella Sinatra Querin as Ella Baynard
- Charlie Zeltzer as Charlie Baynard
- Alice Malakhov as Alice Baynard
- Maximillian Krumme as Max Baynard
- Trenna Keating as Mrs. Pye
- Amos Crawley as Mr. Pye
- Brenda Bazinet as Jeannie Pippett
- Ted Atherton as Mr. Nigel Rose (season 3)
- Liisa Repo-Martell as Mrs. Rose (season 3)

== Episodes ==
Season	Episodes	Originally released (Canada)		Netflix release date (international)
Season	Episodes	First released	Last released	Netflix release date (international)
1	7	March 19, 2017	April 30, 2017	May 12, 2017
2	10	September 23, 2018	November 18, 2018	July 6, 2018
3	10	September 22, 2019	November 24, 2019	January 3, 2020

=== Season 1 (2017) ===
The first season was first aired on the CBC on March 19, 2017. It premiered on Netflix on May 12, 2017. Titles of the season are quotes from Charlotte Brontë, Jane Eyre.

No. overall	No. in season	Title	Directed by	Written by	Original release date
1	1	"Your Will Shall Decide Your Destiny"	Niki Caro	Moira Walley-Beckett	March 19, 2017
Thirteen-year-old Anne Shirley is a bright, over-imaginative orphan. The talkative girl is overjoyed when Marilla and Matthew Cuthbert, the aging siblings who own Green Gables farm in Avonlea, adopt her. Upon arriving, Anne discovers they expected a boy to serve as a hand to Matthew. While Matthew immediately likes the girl, Marilla is determined to send her back but relents after glimpsing what Anne's life would be. She agrees to a one-week trial period. Anne is determined to show the Cuthberts her usefulness on the farm, and Marilla eventually grows a liking to her and Anne finds a friend in Diana Barry. However, when Marilla cannot find a precious brooch, she accuses Anne of stealing it. Anne denies taking it, but when Marilla threatens to send her away unless she confesses, Anne lies and claims she lost it while playing with it outdoors. Marilla sends Anne back to the orphanage but discovers the brooch fell between the chair cushions. She sends Matthew after Anne, but he arrives at the train station too late.
2	2	"I Am No Bird, and No Net Ensnares Me"	Helen Shaver	Moira Walley-Beckett	March 26, 2017
Plagued with memories of being bullied and tormented, Anne arrives at the orphanage. Meanwhile, Matthew tries to catch up with her. Marilla, worried and anxious at Green Gables, wants to follow them, but her friend Mrs. Lynde convinces her to stay home. Meanwhile, Anne has slept outside the orphanage and convinces a milk deliveryman to take her with him, saying she has just found out about relatives who wish to adopt her. When Matthew arrives at the orphanage, the matron says Anne has not returned. The milkman tells Matthew he encountered Anne the day before, leading him to understand where she is. They reunite at the train station where Anne is reciting poems for money. Anne is reluctant to return, but when Matthew calls her his daughter, she embraces him. Back in Avonlea, Anne is saddened when Marilla does not express joy for her return; the next Sunday, Anne, Matthew, and Marilla attend a church picnic, and Anne runs away after hearing the townspeople's hateful comments about her. Marilla finds her and asks for forgiveness. The Cuthberts ask Anne to take their last name by signing the family Bible, becoming officially part of the family.
3	3	"But What Is So Headstrong as Youth?"	Sandra Goldbacher	Moira Walley-Beckett	April 2, 2017
Anne is excited to begin school and make friends, but her high hopes are met with disappointment when she gets teased and bullied for her looks and queer way of expressing herself. Marilla too, tests new waters as she accepts an invitation to join a "Progressive Mothers" group. After watching older student Prissy Andrews in an intimate moment with their teacher, Mr. Phillips, Anne naively suggests to her classmates they were having sex and recounts scenes of violence she had witnessed in the last family she served, causing her classmates and the town to isolate her even more. Because of this, Marilla is no longer invited to the "Progressive Mothers" meetings. On the way to school, Anne is threatened by Prissy's brother, Billy Andrews, but is rescued by Gilbert Blythe, who has returned to school and tries to befriend Anne. Anne refuses Gilbert's attention, remembering that he was liked by one of her other classmates, and decides to ignore him in an attempt to be accepted by her peers. At school, trying to catch her attention, Gilbert pulls one of her braids and calls her "carrots". Anne hits him over the head with her slate. After being chastised in front of the class, she runs from the classroom and arrives home crying in Marilla's arms, saying she will no longer go back to school.
4	4	"An Inward Treasure is Born"	David Evans	Moira Walley-Beckett	April 9, 2017
The Cuthberts worry about Anne's increasing isolation, as she continues to refuse to go to school. Marilla asks for advice from Mrs. Rachel Lynde, who suggests keeping Anne home, but when a distracted Anne burns a pie in the oven, Marilla resolves to have her go back to school. Anne decides to lie and pretend to go to school while she spends the days in the woods fantasizing and inventing stories. When her lies about going to school are exposed, the minister suggests that Anne be educated at home and taught to be a good wife. After a fire at the Gillis house, during which Anne runs into the burning house to close doors and windows to deprive the fire of oxygen, Ruby stays with the Cuthberts and becomes friends with Anne. After talking to Marilla, who leaves the choice up to her, Anne decides to return to school, experiencing the enthusiastic welcome she initially wished for.
5	5	"Tightly Knotted to a Similar String"	Patricia Rozema	Moira Walley-Beckett	April 16, 2017
Anne has finally caught up with the best student in her class, Gilbert Blythe, but she does not get to celebrate as she must cope with the inevitability of womanhood when she gets her first period. In an attempt to help Anne feel better, Marilla proposes that Anne invite Diana over for "grown-up" tea, but the afternoon turns into a disaster when Anne mistakes red wine for raspberry cordial and serves it to her guest, with both of them ending up drunk. When Diana's mother comes to retrieve her daughter and finds the girls drunk, she forbids Diana to see Anne again. Matthew buys Anne a present she has been longing for, a dress with puff sleeves and encounters Jeannie, an old school friend who he hasn't seen since he abandoned school after his older brother's death. Separated at school, Anne and Diana get a few moments together during recess and swear love and devotion to each other, promising they won't have another friend. Anne is overjoyed by Matthew's present, finally having realized her dream of possessing a dress with puff sleeves.
6	6	"Remorse Is the Poison of Life"	Paul Fox	Moira Walley-Beckett	April 23, 2017
When her younger sister Minnie May becomes ill with croup, Diana runs to Green Gables for help. Anne saves Minnie May through her experiences serving and amazes everyone, including Diana's visiting great-aunt Josephine, who takes a particular liking to Anne. Meanwhile, the Blythe farm sees change, as Gilbert's sick father John dies, leaving Gilbert to fend for himself. During the funeral, Marilla reminisces about her youth and her love for John Blythe, while Anne inadvertently insults Gilbert when she tries to dispense advice on how to be an orphan. Anne talks to Aunt Josephine, who just lost her lover Gertrude, and decides to take the old woman as her role model, planning to make her own path in the world. Anne, Diana, and Ruby Gillis prepare food to console Gilbert, and Anne discusses Jane Eyre with Aunt Josephine; as the girls bring the food to Gilbert, Anne refuses to face him and runs off and talks to Josephine, who reveals that she and Gertrude spent their lives together because they were in love. Marilla pays a visit to John Blythe's grave and confesses to Gilbert that his father had asked her to leave Avonlea with him, but she wasn't brave enough; Gilbert is reminded of his father's love for adventure and travel and decides to leave the farm and Avonlea. Matthew receives unsettling news when he discovers that the ship carrying his crops' results sank, and he takes out a loan on Green Gables.
7	7	"Wherever You Are Is My Home"	Amanda Tapping	Moira Walley-Beckett	April 30, 2017
Marilla and Anne learn about Matthew's doing and, during a lively confrontation with his sister, Matthew suffers a heart attack. He survives, but he's confined in bed, while Anne and Marilla visit the bank, which is going to pull the loan back. Anne and Marilla decide to raise the money to save their home by selling all precious items and putting an ad in the paper looking for boarders; Marilla grimly announces that they are to let Jerry go because they can't pay him anymore. Anne and Jerry head to Charlottetown, where Anne deals with a tough pawnbroker and invents adventurous stories about the items to up their prices. Anne decides to contribute to the cause by selling her puff-sleeved dress and meets Miss Jeannie, who recognizes her as "Matthew's Anne". Anne encounters Gilbert, who is working on the docks and trying to get on a ship: they apologize and declare a truce; meanwhile, Jerry gets attacked and his money stolen by two mysterious men. A guilt-ridden Matthew confesses to his sister that he wishes he'd die, leaving Marilla and Anne his life insurance money. Anne and beaten-up Jerry spend the night at Josephine Barry's house and, after learning about the Cuthberts' situation, Josephine hires Jerry to work at Green Gables and gifts Anne a George Eliot book containing money, claiming that "love isn't charity". A desperate Matthew tries to take his life, but he's saved by Miss Jeannie and Marilla, who angrily accuses him of wanting to leave her and Anne. Matthew apologizes and welcomes Anne back home. With Christmas approaching, Anne sells her service as a cleaner to the families of Avonlea, and the Cuthberts take in two boarders, emerging from their financial crisis. However, the two boarders are the mysterious men who had attacked and robbed Jerry.

=== Season 2 (2018) ===
The entire second season premiered on Netflix on July 6, 2018, before premiering on the CBC on September 23, 2018. Titles of the season are quotes from George Eliot, Middlemarch.

No. overall	No. in season	Title	Directed by	Written by	Original release date
8	1	"Youth is the Season of Hope"	Helen Shaver	Moira Walley-Beckett	September 23, 2018
The Cuthberts' boarders, who are conmen, claim there is gold in Avonlea. Nate, one of the boarders, offers to help the residents of Avonlea in testing their soil for gold for $150 per property. Elsewhere, Gilbert makes a new friend, Bash, at sea. Anne, Marilla, and Matthew make a trip to the beach.
9	2	"Signs are Small Measurable Things, but Interpretations are Illimitable"	Paul Fox	Shernold Edwards	September 30, 2018
The steamer lands in Trinidad, bringing Bash face to face with his mother and his past. The Barrys get behind the gold rush, but Matthew and Marilla decide not to spend the $150 to have their land tested for gold.
10	3	"The True Seeing is Within"	Ken Girotti	Kathryn Borel, Jr.	October 7, 2018
Anne goes with the Barrys to Charlottetown. There, she and Diana investigate the claims of gold in Avonlea and are told by a journalist that a scam like this had happened in another part of Canada a few years ago, and claims of gold in Avonlea are also probably fake. Anne tries to warn the Barrys but is sternly rebuffed. Mr. Barry gives all of the money to Nate, who plans to leave with Dunlop. Anne warns Marilla about Nate and Dunlop, but the men overhear her and tie them up. They escape and notify Matthew of what has happened, and he along with his neighbors ride to try to catch them. Dunlop is caught, but Nate escapes with the money.
11	4	"The Painful Eagerness of Unfed Hope"	Anne Wheeler	Jane Maggs	October 14, 2018
Pretending she is Matthew, Anne writes letters to Jeannie to try to rekindle a romance. Matthew finds out and tells Anne how hurt he is by what she has done, which devastates her, thinking he will stop loving her. Matthew meets Jeannie in town and tells her of Anne's ruse, revealing that he wants to spend his remaining years raising Anne to the best of his ability so he cannot rekindle a romantic relationship with her. Diana and Minnie May are being trained by their mother on how to be ladies. Her strict instruction brings stress to her daughters and agitates her husband. It also leads to Minnie May wetting the bed and Diana lashing out at her for it. Eliza realizes how her attempts to educate her daughters have affected them and apologizes, assuring them that she loves them. In Trinidad, Bash and Gilbert come across a young pregnant woman who is thrown out of her brothel house just as she goes into labour. Gilbert helps the woman, despite Bash's initial protests. Gilbert discovers the baby is breech; during the process of turning the baby, he comforts the woman by revealing he was born breech as well. Later, Gilbert reveals to Bash that his mother died giving birth to him.
12	5	"The Determining Acts of Her Life"	Norma Bailey	Amanda Fahey	October 21, 2018
A game of Spin the Bottle prompts burning questions about love and beauty for all the students. Billy cruelly taunts Anne and her looks while Diana gets her first kiss. Anne and Cole bond over their differences as Gilbert makes his way back to Avonlea, bringing Bash.
13	6	"I Protest Against Any Absolute Conclusion"	Ken Girotti	Naledi Jackson	October 28, 2018
Anne faces the world with very short hair, having ruined it trying to dye it raven black. The town preps for its annual Christmas pantomime. Anne is unexpectedly thrust into one of the lead roles at the last minute and shines. Gilbert and Bash have returned to Avonlea and are invited to join the Cuthberts for Christmas dinner. Bash brings a gift of curry for the Cuthberts, and everyone is surprised by the presence of a black man in their midst but gracefully accept him—most of all, Anne, who proclaims how excited she is to meet her first person of color. A jealous Billy causes Cole to fall, and he breaks his wrist. Matthew experiences memories of his long-deceased brother, Michael, which prompt him to an unaccustomed impulsiveness.
14	7	"Memory Has as Many Moods as the Temper"	Anne Wheeler	Jane Maggs	November 4, 2018
Cole accompanies the girls to Great-Aunt Josephine's for a lavish party filled with unusual guests and surprises. Diana struggles with the revelation that Josephine and Gertrude were romantic lovers. Cole struggles with the lingering effects of the wrist injury that prevents him from drawing. Later, Cole confides to Josephine that he believes he is gay. Back at home, Marilla has debilitating headaches and worries that she will be a burden to Anne, as Marilla's late mother was to her. Matthew expresses his regret to Marilla for also being a burden to her and preventing her from leaving Green Gables if she had wanted to when she was younger. Both reconcile the past and their choices while acknowledging the positive effect Anne's presence has been.
15	8	"Struggling Against the Perception of Facts"	Amanda Tapping	Shernold Edwards	November 11, 2018
Marilla sees an oculist and is given new reading glasses. Bash encounters racism in Avonlea, where he is turned away while seeking a doctor for a toothache and when Gilbert attempts to bring him by train to Charlottetown; Bash is rebuffed by the conductor until Marilla comes to their aid. Later Bash goes to "The Bog,” a neighbourhood outside Avonlea where Black people in the area live, and meets a woman named Mary. Marilla buys back a number of her family heirlooms that she sees displayed at a local pawn shop. Cole struggles with Mr. Phillips's hatred of him after they share a moment in the supply room, implying that he is actually gay and marrying Prissy to hide his preference. After being told by Mr. Phillips that she cannot go to college after they are married and witnessing his cruelty to Cole, Priscilla leaves him at the altar on their wedding day. Anne makes a pact with Cole after he reveals to her that he is gay that should, in the future, they never find romantic partners, they will marry as equals and lead the lives they want to.
16	9	"What We Have Been Makes Us What We Are"	Paul Fox	Moira Walley-Beckett	November 18, 2018
A new teacher named Miss Miriam Stacy brings unconventional methods – and a motorbike – to Avonlea. She inadvertently offends the Progressive Mothers and Rachel, who scold her for her modern ways and suggest that she may be ousted from the teaching position if she does not conform and act more conservative. Gilbert's efforts to speed up his studies leave Bash feeling lost in trying to work the Blythe farm. Anne is smitten with the new teacher because she feels Miss Stacy is a kindred spirit; however, as the class introduces themselves to Miss Stacy, Anne's enthusiasm causes her to offer tidbits of gossip about each student. Later, Miss Stacy gently chastises Anne for gossiping and sharing others’ business and instructs her to write an essay as penance. Matthew sets a trap to catch a fox which appears to have been stealing chickens. Anne is extremely upset by this, as well as by Billy's intention to hunt the fox. Anne shows the secret forest house to Marilla and Miss Stacy, who marvel at what Anne and her friends have built. While hunting the fox that night, the boys who have bullied Cole come upon the secret forest house and destroy it, along with Cole's sculptures. Cole finds a winter scarf nearby and realizes that it is Billy's. Cole returns to school and gets into a fight with Billy. Cole pushes Billy into the stove, which causes burns to Billy's ear. Bash goes to visit Mary and spends time with her, expressing his desire to buy land and create a homestead. He later leaves a note for Gilbert.
17	10	"The Growing Good of the World"	Paul Fox	Moira Walley-Beckett	November 18, 2018
Anne, Diana, and Ruby deal with the wreckage of the secret forest house. Miss Stacy makes clear that it is known that Billy and his friends destroyed the house, and she expresses the concern that she may lose her job. Anne trips on the ladder coming out of the chicken coop and drops a basket of eggs on the fox trap, destroying the eggs and causing Anne to become overwrought. Matthew then removes the trap and builds a fence around the chicken coop. A stern and unyielding new male teacher is brought in. Bash helps Mary at the boarding house and they grow closer, but a misunderstanding may derail their relationship. Gilbert goes to The Bog looking for Bash. The children sneak off to Charlottetown, and Diana and Great-Aunt Josephine have a heartfelt talk. Cole reveals that he is going to live with Great-Aunt Josephine and not return to Avonlea. Gilbert sets Bash straight about Bash's misunderstanding with Mary, with surprising results. A town hall meeting is called to decide on the fate of Miss Stacy. Miss Stacy crashes the town hall and speaks in her own defense, wearing trousers and no corset. Anne, Gilbert, and Marilla speak eloquently in Miss Stacy's defense, and the town votes to keep her as the teacher for Avonlea. Bash and Mary get married.

=== Season 3 (2019) ===
The third season was first aired on the CBC on September 22, 2019. It premiered on Netflix on January 3, 2020. Titles of the season are quotes from Mary Shelley, Frankenstein.

No. overall	No. in season	Title	Directed by	Written by	Original release date
18	1	"A Secret Which I Desired to Divine"	Anne Wheeler	Moira Walley-Beckett	September 22, 2019
As Anne's sixteenth birthday approaches, she finds herself longing to know more about her lineage, which surprises and distresses Matthew and Marilla. Nevertheless, they agree to let her go back to the orphanage to learn more, as long as she is chaperoned. Mary and Bash have a baby girl, and Marilla comes over three times a week to help them. Diana is upset that her parents will not let her study at Queens next year with the rest of her friends. Anne writes an article about a local indigenous tribe and becomes friends with one of the girls there.
19	2	"There is Something at Work in My Soul Which I Do Not Understand"	Kim Nguyen	Jane Maggs	September 29, 2019
Anne's search for her parents takes her back to the orphanage, but the matron coldly tells her that those records are no longer there. Anne finds a packet of stories she wrote that were hidden and agonizes over the bad memories she has of the place. Her bully is still there, working at the orphanage. Anne tells the bully she is sorry she is still there, but the bully appears not to have changed much. Cole suggests they come back the following week and go the local church to see if they have any information on Anne's parents. Meanwhile, Elijah pays a visit to Avonlea but resents that Mary has a new baby and gets drunk. He ends up leaving and steals some of Gilbert's valuables. While in Charlottetown, Gilbert has tea with a woman named Winifred Rose, who is his mentor's secretary. Finding Anne's article in the Gazette about her visit to the Mi’kmaq village, Marilla is angry with Anne and forbids her from continuing the search for her birth parents.
20	3	"What Can Stop the Determined Heart"	Anne Wheeler	Shernold Edwards	October 6, 2019
A cut on Mary's hand becomes infected and she is in bed with a fever, so Bash brings the baby to Marilla to be cared for. Marilla and Anne check on Mary, leaving the baby with Matthew, who is enchanted. A printing press has arrived at the school. Mary is diagnosed with sepsis, and the doctor gives her 1–2 weeks to live. Gilbert questions his ability to properly handle dealing with patients as a doctor, and Anne reassures him that caring about people is always the right thing to do. Gilbert goes to The Bog to try to find Elijah with news of Mary. A bartender lies to Gilbert that Elijah booked passage to America, but when Gilbert leaves, Elijah comes out of the back room, thinking Gilbert's message was a ruse to get him in trouble with the law for theft of the items from Gilbert. In response to Mary's pending death, the Avonlea community surprises her on Easter with a big party at the Barry residence.
21	4	"A Hope of Meeting You in Another World"	Norma Bailey	Tracey Deer	October 13, 2019
Bash and Gilbert discuss plans for Mary's funeral. Matthew puts his foot down to allow Anne to continue her search for information about her birth parents, despite Marilla's misgivings. While doing research at the church, Anne discovers that they did die when she was a baby and were originally from Scotland. Following Mary's death, Bash tries to give her letter to Elijah, but they end up in a fistfight when Elijah acts flippant and uncaring about his mother's death. Marilla has a difficult day caring for Delphine and is confronted with harsh judgment by several of the townspeople. Ka'kwet is at first excited to be going to a Canadian school for Native Americans, but she is miserable in the harsh conditions at the school. Diana fakes an ankle injury to spend time away from her parents and spends a lively evening with Jerry's Acadian family. During Mary's funeral, Elijah cries at his distillery.
22	5	"I Am Fearless and Therefore Powerful"	Paul Fox	Naledi Jackson	October 20, 2019
While the students are on a nature walk, Moody injures his leg and is helped by a Mi’kmaq healer. Marilla and Rachel are exhausted from caring for a teething Delphine; Rachel firmly suggests to Bash that he remarry quickly, but Bash writes to his mother instead to ask if she will come. Jerry walks Diana home from school, and a potential romance begins. The students practice for the County Fair barn dance, bringing their romantic anxieties to a head. Ruby is frightened that she could get pregnant by touching a boy during dancing, which makes all the girls anxious; Miss Stacy has to delicately set them straight. But the girls still have many unanswered questions about marriage and motherhood. Anne and Gilbert share a profound moment of connection during dance practice. Gilbert writes a heartfelt obituary for Mary, which is published in the Gazette. The Barrys are touched by the obituary and ponder how they can help Sebastian further. Anne and the girls celebrate Beltane by the Lake of Shining Waters, having gotten the idea from Anne's book of Scottish customs.
23	6	"The Summit of My Desires"	Norma Bailey	Amanda Fahey	October 27, 2019
Avonlea hosts the Island County Fair. Anne and Marilla are baking for the fair; Anne is baking her “Mary” cake recipe to enter in the baking competition. Matthew has grown a giant radish which is sure to win a prize. Anne is suffering from a cold. Gilbert prepares to meet Winifred's parents and is feeling tense about it. Anne consults a fortune teller at the fair about the feelings between her and Gilbert. Jerry and Diana become closer, while a jealous Anne lashes out at Gilbert when she sees him with Winifred Rose. Anne's cake contains an unpleasant surprise. Meanwhile, Billy besmirches Josie's reputation.
24	7	"A Strong Effort of the Spirit of Good"	Paul Fox	Kathryn Borel, Jr	November 3, 2019
Anne's opinion article isn't received in quite the way she planned. Her impulsive decision to publish an article about equality without getting approval from Miss Stacy not only upsets Josie but causes the town board to ban Anne from the newspaper and direct the other students about what they can and can't write. The alternative is to remove the printing press from the school. Rachel has an unpleasant moment of clarity while participating in the town board meeting. Anne apologizes to Josie but is rebuffed. Prissy Andrews comes to understand how circumscribed her life is as a woman. Anne and Diana argue about Diana's relationship with Jerry, and the argument becomes about their own friendship. They are no longer speaking. Anne organizes a protest with her friends claiming that they should have freedom of speech. After the protest, Anne thanks Gilbert for his help.
25	8	"Great and Sudden Change"	Amanda Tapping	Jane Maggs	November 10, 2019
The town elders remove the printing press from the school in secret and burn down the school. Mrs. Lynde realizes that they did it and threatens to tell everyone unless three more women are added to the town board. The students sit for the Queens entrance exams, including Diana, who is encouraged by Aunt Josephine to take it. Ka'kwet runs away from residential school and returns to her village. Bash's mother, Hazel, comes to Avonlea to help take care of Delphine. Mr. Rose gives permission to Gilbert to marry his daughter and implies that he will help pay for his medical education in Paris. Before going forward with his proposal to Winifred, Gilbert speaks with Anne to see if she might want to be with him, but Anne is unsure what to do and dismisses him. Anne and Diana patch up their quarrel.
26	9	"A Dense and Frightful Darkness"	Paul Fox	Tracey Deer & Shernold Edwards	November 17, 2019
The authorities come back to the Indian village and forcibly remove Ka'kwet and bring her back to school. Matthew and Anne journey with Ka'kwet's parents to bring Ka'kwet back. Anne writes down her feelings for Gilbert in a note, but the note is misplaced and Gilbert never reads it. Instead, he travels to Charlottetown to propose to Winifred. Bash and his mother argue about their differences. With her parents unable to gain access, Ka'kwet remains alone at her school.
27	10	"The Better Feeling of My Heart"	Amanda Tapping	Moira Walley-Beckett	November 24, 2019
Most of the students pass their test for acceptance into Queen's College. Diana is also accepted, but it takes some time before her parents will permit her to attend. Gilbert tells Winifred that he cannot ask her to marry him, as he is in love with someone else. Meanwhile, Anne rips up a note without reading it where Gilbert professes his love to her. Marilla and Matthew discover information about Anne's deceased parents. A reformed Elijah returns, and Bash and Hazel allow him to stay. Anne and Gilbert find out about each other's feelings, kiss, and promise to stay in touch while she is at Queen's College and he is at University of Toronto. In her first letter to Gilbert, Anne delightedly reports that her red hair was inherited from her late mother, Bertha.

== Production ==
=== Development ===
The production companies are listed as Northwood Anne, Northwood Entertainment and Canadian Broadcasting Corporation. The executive producers are Miranda de Pencier and series creator Moira Walley-Beckett.

According to de Pencier, the adaptation of the novel for this television series was intended to provide a different look and feel compared to past productions; they were aiming for a "documentary level of realism", as reflected in the extraordinary detail which has gone into the design of sets and costumes.

Production on the third season started in March 2019.

=== Crew ===
Besides the show itself having a larger number of female characters than male, women serving as executive producer and showrunner, the series has several female directors. Every writer on the series is also female; showrunner Moira Walley-Beckett scripted the entire first season, and was joined by a team of women writers in seasons 2 and 3.

=== Casting ===
Approximately 1800 girls on three continents auditioned for the role of Anne Shirley through an open casting call. Amybeth McNulty was chosen for her ability to deliver dialogue which is "incredibly thick and dynamic and beautiful", according to Miranda de Pencier. Walley-Beckett describes her as at once "luminous", transparent, smart, soulful and emotional. According to an interview with McNulty, an Irish Canadian whose career on stage has included roles in Annie, The Sound of Music, and Oliver!, and on screen in Agatha Raisin and Clean Break, her audition for Anne "consisted of talking to trees, chatting with flowers and building thrones out of twigs."

=== Filming ===
The series was occasionally filmed on Prince Edward Island but, for budgetary reasons, it was primarily filmed in Southern Ontario, at a Toronto studio, at outdoor locations in or near Toronto including Black Creek Pioneer Village, in Waterloo Region at locations including Doon Pioneer Village, Castle Kilbride, New Hamburg, Cambridge, and in communities such as Millbrook, Pickering, Orono, Hamilton, and Caledon.

=== Music ===
The opening theme is the song "Ahead by a Century" performed and originally composed by Canadian band The Tragically Hip. The series underscore is composed by Amin Bhatia and Ari Posner.

== Themes ==
While "many classic moments [of the novel] are dutifully re-created," Walley-Beckett constructed Anne with an E with "a darker undercurrent" than previous adaptations of Anne of Green Gables. She envisioned Anne as an antihero, adding original backstories to her adaptation that emphasized the impact of bullying, class-based discrimination, social isolation, and consequent PTSD on the construction of Anne's character (themes hinted at, but never elaborated upon, in the original novel). Walley-Beckett further states: "In this day and age, themes of identity, prejudice, bullying, being an outsider, searching for a way to be accepted and how to belong are entirely topical and super relevant, and those are themes that are built into the story of Anne". She went on to call Anne Shirley an "accidental feminist", and how she "really wanted to tell this story now". Amybeth McNulty (who portrays Anne) also stated that, "people might think [the new scenes] are quite graphic ... but I think it was time to be honest."

=== Season 2 ===
For the second season, according to what she called her "master plan", Walley-Beckett introduced an entirely new character of her own, Bash, to reflect the racial diversity present in and around Charlottetown at the time of the novel, with a view to representing a community absent from previous adaptations, achieving this by having Gilbert travel on a steamship and meet with the new character in Trinidad: "Bash is the vehicle to explore intolerance and inequality, even more when he goes to The Bog, when he learns that other black people live there." Walley-Beckett explained: "The Bog is the community that's just outside of Charlottetown, where people of color were marginalized and had their own community there."

=== Season 3 ===
In the third season, topics such as identity, feminism, bullying and gender parity were explored. The third season also focused on residential schools and treatment of Indigenous people in Canada's history.

== Release ==
The series initially premiered on March 19, 2017, on the CBC and aired on a weekly basis, the season finale airing on April 30, 2017. The series debuted on Netflix on May 12, 2017, under the title Anne with an E.

On August 3, 2017, the CBC and Netflix renewed the series for a 10-episode second season, which premiered on Netflix on July 6, 2018, and on the CBC on September 23, 2018. CBC adopted the Anne with an E name beginning in the second season.

In August 2018, the CBC and Netflix renewed the series for a 10-episode third season, which premiered on September 22, 2019, on CBC and was released on Netflix on January 3, 2020.

=== Cancellation ===
CBC president Catherine Tait stated in October 2019 that it would no longer involve itself in co-productions with Netflix, as they constitute deals "that hurt the long-term viability of our domestic industry". A day after the third season concluded its Canadian run and despite statements from the CBC previously expressing "no doubt that Canadians will continue to fall in love with this beautiful and heartwarming series for seasons to come," Netflix and the CBC announced the show's cancellation the morning after the season three finale aired in Canada, marketing the season three release on Netflix as the show's "final season".

Alternate reasons for cancellation were given on November 27 in response to a Twitter campaign to save the show, namely a lack of audience growth in the 25–54 age range, which fans on Twitter and Facebook have challenged by questioning how the CBC tracks viewers' ages, and the fact their CBC Gem app does not ask for personal information. Despite the CBC indicating that Netflix had agreed that the third season would be the show's last, fans started a concerted online and offline campaign, much of it led by Twitter fans through the hashtag #renewannewithane.

There were some fans who attempted to flood and bombard unrelated CBC and Netflix posts with the #renewannewithane hashtag (and general commentary regarding renewal) leading the CBC to block them from commenting on future posts. Netflix has never responded to campaign efforts.

A petition was started by fans to protest the cancellation of the show, and is currently the largest petition ever started by a fanbase for a cancelled television show. Some fans also created an informative website for other fans where they can keep up to date on renewal efforts.

Fans also crowdfunded to erect billboards in an effort to garner attention of current and potential new viewers, but also other television networks and the press. In January 2020 a set of billboards was put on display at the centre of Yonge and Dundas Square in Toronto, and shortly after another large billboard was on display in Times Square, New York City. The fans followed this successful run with another several days of billboards in Toronto, using various art and imagery done by fans of the show from various parts of the world. Many of the cast and crew, including McNulty and Walley-Beckett, visited the billboards in person and posted on their social media pages.

Canadian actor Ryan Reynolds and English singer Sam Smith also tweeted in support of the series.

== Reception ==
=== Critical response ===
Palak Jayswal gives the entire series five out of five stars and notes that while classic works of literature are often best left intact, Anne with an E offers a useful case study of when "the remake of a classic is done better than the original". She suggests that while "the Netflix adaptation is brutal", its portrayal is one that is "realistic of what life was like during the time period for an orphan girl". She thus states that "the reason this show is so successful is its ability to not only bring the original story to life but to add to it in a truly authentic way". Erin Maxwell concurs, arguing that in contrast to Tiger King, "Anne with an E might be the most wholesome and engaging TV show that no one in America is talking about. But it is definitely a show that needs to be consumed, discussed, and re-watched just as appreciatively". She also notes that "there are occasional changes in the narrative and attempts to be 'woke', but it wisely doesn't derail much from the original story". Chad Jones qualifies the entire series as a "cool" adaptation of the novel, noting that "from the theme song by The Tragically Hip to the assortment of timely issues – racism, feminism, bullying – that may have been hinted at in the book but have definitely been brought to the fore by creator Moira Walley-Beckett, this is not your grandmother's Green Gables". Jon Hersey at The Objective Standard writes, "If you can stand a tearjerker—and if you enjoy art that glorifies imagination, individualism, free inquiry, and the passionate pursuit of values—you may just fall in love with Walley-Beckett's Anne with an E".

==== Season 1 ====
On Rotten Tomatoes season 1 has an approval rating of 83% based on 29 critic reviews. The site's critical consensus states: "Anne with an E uses its complex central character to offer a boldly stylish, emotionally resonant spin on classic source material that satisfies in its own right." The series has received a rating of 79 on Metacritic based on fifteen reviews, indicating "generally favorable reviews".

Emily Ashby, writing for Common Sense Media, calls the series an "exceptional" and "spectacular" interpretation, giving it four out of five stars. Tasha Cerny, contributor for the Tracking Board, praises the cinematography as lush and colourful, the characters vibrant, and the plot "surprisingly thrilling for a story about a young girl living in a small secluded community in the late nineteenth century. I laughed, I cried, and I didn't expect either from a show about a little girl." Gwen Inhat of The A.V. Club calls the series "at once darker and sweeter than the original" novel, praising the core cast, reserving the highest for the series lead:

Amybeth McNulty defies her youth with a performance that's less a portrayal of Anne than an absolute possession. It can't be easy to make Anne's fanciful language sing the way she does, and McNulty captures the endearing awkwardness that enables Anne to win over everyone she comes in contact with.

Writing of the 90-minute premiere episode for the Toronto Star, Johanna Schneller was appreciative of Walley-Beckett's departures from the novel, bringing its subtext to the fore: "Reading between the novel's lines and adding verisimilitude, she gives us quick but potent glimpses of the miseries many orphans faced in 1890s imperialist culture." Hanh Nguyen, reviewing the series for IndieWire, concurred with this assessment, saying:

Rather than ruining the series, they give the context for why Anne would be filled with gratitude for the beauties of nature, basic human decency and having a family to call her own. Montgomery had based much of Anne's need for escape into imagination on her own lonely childhood, and her stories have always had an underlying poignancy that made them all the sweeter.

Jen Chaney, writing for Vulture.com, agrees, saying: "What distinguishes it from other previous Anne iterations is its willingness to harden some of the story's softness, just enough, to create an element of realism that period pieces, Gables-related or not, can be inclined to avoid." Neil Genzlinger writing for The New York Times, commenting on reports of darkness and grittiness, also praises the production: "Ms. McNulty's Anne is still wonderfully ebullient and eminently likable; she's just not the one-dimensional figure of other adaptations". Annie Hirschlag, writing for Mic, suggests that a genuinely contemporary Anne is bound to reflect the current television landscape and wider culture of its times (the 2010s): "Since today's entertainment is peppered with antiheroes — characters who are far from perfect, even occasionally villainous — it makes sense that Anne's familiar idealism is fringed with darkness and agony."

Some reviewers were more ambivalent, mainly about Walley-Beckett's changes to the story. Canadian novelist Saleema Nawaz, who reviewed the 90-minute first episode for Toronto Life, said she enjoyed it more than she expected, particularly the set designs and costumes, as well as the performances by McNulty and Thomson, and she approved of the choice of theme song as reflective of the continued relevance of the source material. She was less sure about how far the series intended to stray from that source material, and disapproved of the "manufactured drama, such as Matthew's wild horse ride". Writing for Entertainment Weekly, Isabella Beidenharn expressed similar feelings, but, "putting the source material aside, it's a fine show on its own", and she conceded that "inventing a dark side might help Anne With an E fit into today's TV landscape". Allison Keene, writing for Collider, agrees that Anne is a good drama on its own terms, but allows it is "only a fair adaptation" of the novel, at its best in the home scenes: "Anne with an E is undeniably the most stylish adaptation we've ever seen of Anne of Green Gables. But its desire to reveal more of Anne's miserable past in order to be more true to what the desperation of an orphan is like feels at odds with Montgomery's story." Writing for Variety, critic Sonia Saraiya is even more ambivalent, describing the series as on the one hand "a brilliant adaptation" which "succeeds admirably", but on the other hand, "the show can't quite sustain the brilliance, veering first into maudlin territory and then into the oddly saccharine as it tests out its tone", contending that "the show gets a bit bogged down in telling the story of Anne's dysfunction", presenting "a slightly soapy view of Anne's trials and tribulations that at times really humanize her and in others, are rather infantilizing".

Sarah Larson, writing for The New Yorker, was not at all impressed with changes made to the story, arguing that they alter Anne's character to the point of non-recognition. While she acknowledges that bringing subtext to the fore is a fine idea, she is not pleased with the execution, saying that the result is part "the Anne we know and love" and part "untrustworthy stranger", calling the alteration and addition of scenes a "betrayal" of Montgomery's novel, comparing the treatment unfavourably to Patricia Rozema's 1999 adaptation of Jane Austen's Mansfield Park. Laura Finch writing for "World", agrees, saying, "...despite some of the positive feminist themes found here (like whether or not girls should go to school), it's often hard to find the original Anne amid the extraneous storylines." For Joanna Robinson, writing for Vanity Fair, a central problem with the show is that it "seems to think that in order for Anne to be a feminist figure, she has to butt up against a straw-man-filled patriarchy," and so it turned many of the male characters into misogynists, most notably the Reverend Allan, who is considered by Anne to be a "kindred spirit" in the book: "Anne with an E seems to think Anne's triumphs are only noteworthy if she's continually told she can't succeed, when in fact her unfettered brilliance needs no such clumsy opposition. It also seems to think that Anne needs a radical feminist makeover when, in fact, the story of her success was feminist in its own right." This is part of a more general problem Robinson notes, that conflicts are exaggerated and overdone: "this series thrives on non-stop tragedy."

==== Season 2 ====
On Rotten Tomatoes, season 2 has an approval rating of 43% based on 8 critic reviews, with an average rating of 8/10. Hanh Nguyen writes that despite "periods of melancholy and turmoil, this season feels more energetic and subsequently lighter because of the faster pace. It also is more comfortable in its skin and handles humor in its everyday situations deftly while also poking fun at itself." Allison Keene, despite her misgivings about the first season's divergence from the original novel, says it grew on her; she approves of the second season's "major shift in tone" and how, in moving away from the books and expanding the world, "it also moves towards excellence." Conversely, Heather Hogan, who "hated" the first season for similar reasons in her review of the first season, and despite loving the now open "gayness" of the second season, nevertheless concludes her review thus: "Anne With an E continues to use characters shoehorned in from 2018 to explain race and gender and sexuality to people on Prince Edward Island in 1908 as a way of explaining those things to people watching television on the internet in 2018. It's clunky and weird and sometimes embarrassing. The dialogue sometimes feels like it was written in an alien language and run through Google Translator. The drama is so overwrought it's ridiculous. The characters remain unrecognizable."

Meghan O'Keefe, who was "charmed" by the first season, is "baffled" by the second season's choices of new storylines: "I'm not such a purist that I need TV adaptations to hit every beat of a novel, but I do think that television made for families should understand what their own core philosophy is. While Walley-Beckett's instincts are good, I think this show is too enamored with its trappings of darkness to realize that Anne of Green Gables has endured this long because people love the small specificity of the characters' lives. Warping these details for showier TV kind of dilutes the story." Author Amy Glynn says "it's agonizing because it is visually lovely and incredibly well-acted sanctimonious twaddle."

==== Season 3 ====
On Rotten Tomatoes, season 3 has three positive (out of three) critic reviews. Alici Rengifo finds that the series ends on a fitting note, bringing Anne to a point of "real growth"; the finale is "all about how life does indeed go on". Shannon Campe lamented: "It's hard not to feel the series was ending just as it began to find its voice, even if it muddles some of its 'kid-friendly' messages on racism and other issues". Rengifo appreciates the final season's "many little twists, journeys and a vast array of characters".

It's a shame this show has to leave, it has a classic style that harkens back to books like Little Women, while updating the tone for contemporary viewers who could have a lot of fun while taking in a few life lessons along the way. Anne will be missed, hopefully she'll have heirs.

== Awards and nominations ==
Year	Award	Category	Nominee(s)	Result	Ref.
2018	Canadian Screen Awards	Best Lead Actress, Drama Series	Amybeth McNulty	Nominated	
2018	Canadian Screen Awards	Best Drama Series	Anne with an E	Won	
2018	Canadian Screen Awards	Best Supporting Actor, Drama	R. H. Thomson	Won	
2018	Canadian Screen Awards	Best Supporting Actress, Drama	Geraldine James	Nominated	
2018	Canadian Screen Awards	Best Guest Performance, Drama	Deborah Grover	Nominated	
2018	Canadian Screen Awards	Best Direction, Drama Series	Helen Shaver	Nominated	
2018	Canadian Screen Awards	Best Direction, Drama Series	Niki Caro	Nominated	
2018	Canadian Screen Awards	Best Writing, Drama Series	Moira Walley-Beckett	Nominated	
2018	Teen Choice Awards	Breakout TV Show	Anne with an E	Nominated	
2019	ACTRA Toronto Awards	Outstanding Performance – Female	Amybeth McNulty	Won	
2019	GLAAD Media Award	Outstanding Kids & Family Programming	Anne with an E	Nominated	
2019	Canadian Screen Awards	Best Drama Series	Anne with an E	Won	
2019	Canadian Screen Awards	Best Actress, Drama Series	Amybeth McNulty	Won	
2019	Canadian Screen Awards	Best Supporting Actress, Drama	Geraldine James	Won	
2019	Canadian Screen Awards	Best Supporting Actor, Drama	R. H. Thomson	Won	
2019	Canadian Screen Awards	Best Direction, Drama Series	Helen Shaver	Nominated	
2019	Canadian Screen Awards	Best Writing, Drama Series	Kathryn Borel	Nominated	
2019	Canadian Screen Awards	Best Guest Performance, Drama	Dalmar Abuzeid	Nominated	
2020	ACTRA Toronto Awards	Outstanding Performance – Female	Cara Ricketts	Won	
2020	ACTRA Toronto Awards	Outstanding Performance – Male	Dalmar Abuzeid	Won	
2020	ACTRA Toronto Awards	Outstanding Performance – Male	Araya Mengesha	Nominated	
