= East Village, Manitoba =

East Village is a fictional town in the Canadian province of Manitoba, frequently used as a setting in novels by Miriam Toews. The town was based on Toews's real-life hometown of Steinbach. East Village appears in A Complicated Kindness and All My Puny Sorrows as well as the film adaptation of All My Puny Sorrows. Toews also refers to Steinbach in Fight Night and her nonfiction work Swing Low.

Nomi Nickel, the teenaged protagonist of A Complicated Kindness, lives in the small Mennonite town of East Village, Manitoba, but longs to live in the "real East Village" in New York City. She lives with her father in a bungalow on Manitoba Highway 12, a real life highway that runs through Steinbach. While Steinbach has multiple churches, the fictional East Village is dominated by one conservative Mennonite church pastored by Hans "The Mouth" Rosenfeldt, the villain of the novel. East Village young people, according to Nomi Nickel, are banned from "media, dancing, smoking, temperate climates, movies, drinking, rock'n'roll, having sex for fun, swimming, make-up, jewellery, playing pool, going to cities or staying up past nine o'clock." East Village does have a movie theatre, although Nomi is forbidden from attending and, like the real Steinbach, has a museum, and numerous car dealerships.

The name East Village alludes to Steinbach's position as the eastern-most community of the East Reserve, a historically Mennonite block settlement. In 2024, a historic plaque was placed in front of Toews' teenage home in Steinbach, the real-life inspiration for the East Village bungalow referred to in her novels.

Steinbach has also been fictionalized as Kleindarp by Al Reimer, Edenfeld by Andrew Unger, and Rocky Creek by MaryLou Driedger.
