= Summer of My Amazing Luck =

1996 novel by Miriam Toews

- Author: Miriam Toews
- Language: English
- Published: 1996 (Turnstone Press)
- Publication place: Canada
- Media type: Print (paperback)
- Pages: 192 pp (first edition)

Summer of My Amazing Luck is the first novel by the Canadian author Miriam Toews published in 1996 by Turnstone Press.

It is a humorous novel about "welfare mothers" in a Winnipeg housing complex, who take a summer trip to Colorado. The novel was shortlisted for the Stephen Leacock Memorial Medal for Humour, and the McNally Robinson Book of the Year Award. The story was loosely-based on Toews's own experiences as a young mother.

After the success of A Complicated Kindness, Summer of My Amazing Luck and Toews's second novel A Boy of Good Breeding were re-released by Toews's current publisher Penguin Random House in 2006.
