= Amybeth McNulty =

Irish and Canadian actress (born 2001)

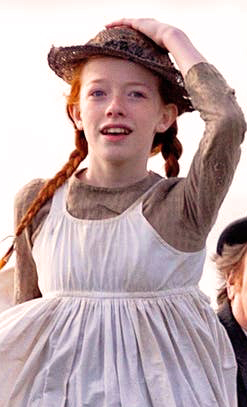
- McNulty as Anne Shirley in Anne with an E
- Born: 7 November 2001 (age 24); Letterkenny, County Donegal, Ireland
- Occupation: Actress
- Years active: 2014–present

Amybeth McNulty (born 7 November 2001) is an Irish and Canadian actress. She is known for her starring role as Anne Shirley in the CBC/Netflix drama series Anne with an E (2017–2019), based on the 1908 novel Anne of Green Gables by Lucy Maud Montgomery, and for her role as Vickie in the Netflix Sci-Fi series Stranger Things (2022–2025).

== Early life ==
Amybeth McNulty was born in Letterkenny General Hospital on 7 November 2001 and was raised in Milford, a small town in the north of County Donegal in The Republic of Ireland, the northernmost province in Ireland, the only daughter of an Irish father and a Canadian mother. She was homeschooled. She was a member of An Grianán Theatre's "Youth Theatre" in Letterkenny, where she trained in acting and ballet.

== Career ==
McNulty's stage experience began with ballet and amateur performances at An Grianán's "Youth Theatre" in Letterkenny. In 2014, McNulty co-starred in the RTÉ One series Clean Break as inquisitive child Jenny Rane. In 2015, McNulty appeared in Agatha Raisin as the younger version of the titular character and guest-starred in CBBC's The Sparticle Mystery. McNulty made her film debut in sci-fi thriller Morgan, portraying the 10-year-old iteration of the titular character. The film received mixed reviews.

From 2017 to 2019, she starred as Anne Shirley-Cuthbert in the CBC and Netflix drama series Anne with an E, an adaptation of the 1908 novel series Anne of Green Gables by Lucy Maud Montgomery. McNulty was cast from a selection of 1,800 girls for her ability to deliver dialogue which is "incredibly thick and dynamic and beautiful"; "her audition consisted of talking to trees, chatting with flowers and building thrones out of twigs." McNulty received critical acclaim for her portrayal; Gwen Inhat of The A.V. Club lauded her "absolute possession" of Anne as well as her ability to make "fanciful language sing", while Neil Genzlinger from The New York Times wrote McNulty's performance was "wonderfully ebullient and eminently likable". Her portrayal earned her the Canadian Screen Award for Best Television Actress and the ACTRA Award for Best Performance – Female.

McNulty portrayed the lead role in the 2024 indie thriller She Came Back (pre-release title Maternal), the feature directorial debut of actress Megan Follows, which was filmed in early 2020. She also starred in Black Medicine (2020), in which she portrays an alcoholic and drug-addicted Irish teenager. In December 2020, McNulty was cast in director Michael McGowan's film adaptation of All My Puny Sorrows, a novel by Canadian author Miriam Toews. In June 2021, McNulty was cast in the fourth series of the Netflix drama Stranger Things, portraying Vickie, a "cool, fast-talking band nerd". She reprised the role for its fifth and final series.

In June 2026, McNulty was announced to be starring in the forthcoming series Lucy Maud, a biopic of the Anne of Green Gables author Lucy Maud Montgomery. McNulty will star alongside Megan Follows, who also played Anne between 1985 and 2000.

== Personal life ==
At 19, McNulty moved out from her family home in County Donegal to London. In June 2020, she came out as bisexual. McNulty is a vegetarian.

In January 2026 on The Late Late Show, McNulty revealed that Stranger Things was the last audition her parents knew she did before they died. Her mother, Siobhan McNulty, died following a battle with cancer in November 2021, and her dad, Liam McNulty, died two years later in December 2023. McNulty said her parents "had a good feeling" about her audition. "They were right and that was quite nice for me."

== Filmography ==
=== Film ===
| Year | Title | Role | Note(s) |
|---|---|---|---|
| 2012 | A Risky Undertaking | Ariadne Pleasant | |
| 2014 | Morgan | young Morgan | |
| 2019 | Black Medicine | Áine | |
| 2019 | All My Puny Sorrows | Nora Von Riesen | |
| 2024 | She Came Back | Charlie McLeod | |
| 2024 | Maternal | Charley | |
| 2025 | Ballistic | Diana | |

=== Television ===
| Year | Title | Role | Note(s) |
|---|---|---|---|
| 2014 | Agatha Raisin | young Agatha Raisin | 1 episode |
| 2015 | Clean Break | Jenny Rane | 4 episodes |
| 2015 | The Sparticle Mystery | Sputnik | 2 episodes |
| 2017–2019 | Anne with an E | Anne Shirley-Cuthbert | Lead role |
| 2022–2025 | Stranger Things | Victoria "Vickie" Dunne | Recurring role (season 4); Also starring (season 5) |
| Forthcoming | Lucy Maud | TBC | Main role |

== Awards and nominations ==
| Year | Award | Category | Nominated work | Result | Ref(s) |
|---|---|---|---|---|---|
| 2018 | Canadian Screen Awards | Best Lead Actress, Drama Series | Anne with an E | Nominated | |
| 2019 | Canadian Screen Awards | Best Lead Actress, Drama Series | Anne with an E | Won | |
| 2019 | ACTRA Toronto Awards | Outstanding Performance – Female | Anne with an E | Won | |
| 2020 | Canadian Screen Awards | Best Lead Actress, Drama Series | Anne with an E | Nominated | |
