= Buium =

Buium is a surname. Notable people with the surname include:

- Orlee Buium, Canadian film editor
- Shai Buium (born 2003), American ice hockey player
- Zeev Buium (born 2005), American ice hockey player
