= Irma Voth =

2011 novel by Miriam Toews

- Author: Miriam Toews
- Original title: Irma Voth
- Cover artist: Kelly Hill
- Language: English
- Published: 2011
- Publisher: Knopf Canada
- Media type: Print (hardback & paperback)
- Pages: 255
- ISBN: 978-0-307-40068-0
- OCLC: 794664585
- Preceded by: The Flying Troutmans
- Followed by: All My Puny Sorrows

Irma Voth (2011) is the fifth novel by Canadian author Miriam Toews. The novel, about a Mennonite teenager whose life is transformed when a bohemian film crew comes to her settlement to make a film about Mennonites, was informed by Toews' experience as lead actress in Silent Light, the award-winning 2007 film written and directed by Mexican filmmaker Carlos Reygadas.

== Plot ==
In a remote Mennonite colony in the Mexican state of Chihuahua, nineteen-year-old Irma Voth has been banished to a neighbouring farm by her strict, religious father after secretly marrying a non-Mennonite Mexican. After her new husband soon disappears into the drug trade, Irma tends to the farm alone. Her world is transformed when a bohemian film crew from Mexico City arrives to make a film about Mennonites. Irma, who speaks Plautdietsch (Low German), Spanish and English, is hired by Diego, the film's director, to act as interpreter and to cook for the crew.

As Irma is drawn into the exotic world of the hip, urban filmmakers, she begins to better understand her place in the world, and to envision the possibility of some form of self-determination. She wonders, "How do I behave in this world without following the directions of my father, my husband, or God?" Her thirteen-year-old sister, Aggie, is also emboldened by the presence of the outsiders, and like Irma, comes into dangerous conflict with the local community and her father, who believes that "Art is a lie." When their father's violence escalates, and the secret tragedy that has haunted her family begins to surface, Irma flees with Aggie and her infant sister, Ximena, to Chihuahua City and Acapulco. They eventually go to Mexico City, where the Voth sisters must embrace the ways of the city in order to survive.

== Background ==
Toews has said that many of the scenes and events in Irma Voth are inspired by her experience in filming Silent Light, directed by Carlos Reygadas. Reygadas invited Toews to do a screen test for the role of Esther, a conservative Mennonite wife, after reading her novel, A Complicated Kindness, and seeing her author photo on the back flap. Despite her lack of acting experience, Toews went on to play the role and was later nominated for best actress at Mexico's Ariel Awards for her performance.

The film, which tells the story of an extramarital affair between a farmer with many children and a single woman, won a number of awards including the Jury Prize at the Cannes Film Festival. It was also selected as the Mexican entry for the Best Foreign Language Oscar at the 80th Academy Awards. Roger Ebert named the film one of the top ten independent films of 2009 as well as one of the best films of the 2000s.

Toews shares direct lineage with the Mennonites who took part in Silent Light. All of the actors in film, with the exception of Toews and Maria Pankratz, the two lead actresses, were members of the Cuauhtémoc Mennonite Settlement. Toews is a descendant of one of the 1874 families from Ukraine to first settle in Steinbach, Manitoba, the largely conservative Mennonite town where she was born and raised.

In the early 1920s, under pressure to integrate into Canada's national school system, thousands of Manitoban Mennonites chose to emigrate to Northern Mexico, where they had assurances from Mexican President Alvaro Obregon that they could retain religious independence and full control of their own school program. The majority resettled in the state of Chihuahua and established a village structure of campos, strips of houses surrounded by fields. They continue to speak Low German (Plattdeutsch) within the community in the 21st century, as well as Spanish, and many have learned English. They marry within the community. Today, most of the approximately 100,000 Mennonites in Chihuahua still work as farmers, growing corn and beans, raising cattle and horses, and producing cheese.

Given the geographical and cultural isolation of these settlements, obedience to the ministers and elders of the church is at the center of colony life, and the threat of excommunication into the outside world is much feared. Toews explains how, in Irma Voth, her protagonists come to feel allegiances beyond the limits of their community: "Irma and Aggie find their authority—God, the Bible, the religious men with all their injunctions—at home, in their Mennonite community. They find another authority in the artistic community, and it’s one that gives them more space to decide on their own beliefs and behaviours. Irma quickly sees it’s not a loving community, hypocritical like any other, but she spots the possibility of personal redemption of some kind, through art, and its transformative powers."

== Film within the novel ==
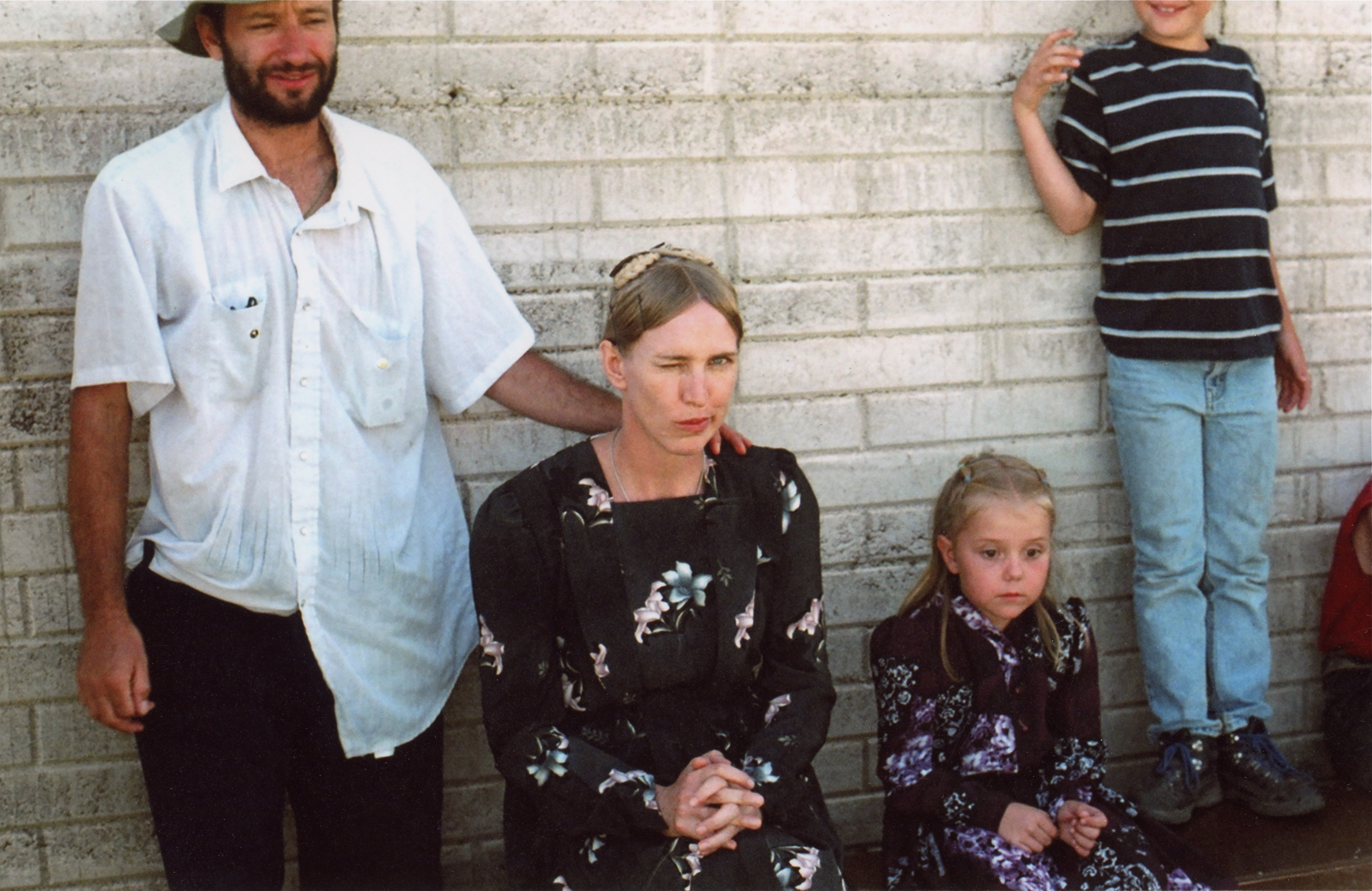
Carlos Reygadas & Miriam Toews on the set of Silent Light

Though never named or acknowledged in Irma Voth, Silent Light is recognizably the film-within-the-novel. During her many weeks on the set, Toews saw the daily realities of making a film in difficult conditions, as well as the specific dynamics of conflict and cooperation between the Spanish-Mexican film crew and the ultra-conservative Mennonites, some of whom were hostile to the presence of the outsiders.

Through the novel's eponymous narrator, Toews depicts the filming of several scenes that are part of Silent Light. However, in the context of Toews' fictional story, they take on a different character. Catherine E. Wall argues that "Two particularly notable scenes in the sensual and gorgeous Reygadas film—a long hilltop kiss and a family swimming and bathing in an idyllic location—become repulsive in Irma's retelling of the film takes." Irma Voth can be read as a companion piece to the Reygadas film in its depiction of Mennonites in Mexico. "Irma Voth and Silent Light provide interesting counterpoint views of a culture as seen through the eyes of an outsider. Of course, Reygadas and the fictional filmmaker in Irma Voth portray a society within its insular context, a culture out of time and place, while Toews and Irma Voth have learned to coexist in both worlds."

== Reception ==
Rachel Shabi, writing for the Guardian, described Irma Voth as "an unexpected mix, switching, sometimes in one sentence, from trapped despair to warm, wry humour. It chills and soothes the heart at the same time." John Barber of The Globe and Mail writes that "the characters of Irma Voth pulse with individual feeling. Irma herself—a semi-shunned single mother living alone in a trailer—is a deep study of raw courage. Most distinctively, and typical of Toews, Irma Voth is hilarious... more accessible than the art-house film with which it is entwined." Irma Voth was shortlisted for the 2012 Canadian Authors Association Award for Fiction and was a National Post Best Book.
