= A Truce That Is Not Peace =

2025 memoir by Miriam Toews

- First edition cover
- Author: Miriam Toews
- Genre: Memoir
- Publisher: Bloomsbury Publishing
- Publication date: August 26, 2025
- Pages: 192
- ISBN: 978-1-639-73474-0

A Truce That Is Not Peace is a 2025 memoir by Canadian writer Miriam Toews. It was published on August 26, 2025, and received positive reception from critics.

== Summary ==
In the memoir, Toews attempts to answer the question "why do you write?", making connections to her sister and father's respective suicides.

== Development history ==
Toews began writing the book after being rejected from a literary conference in Mexico City. The conference organizer had sent all participants a request for an essay on the question "Why do I write?" and, after rejecting three of Toews' attempted answers, rescinded her invitation altogether.

=== Publication history ===
The book was released by Bloomsbury Publishing on August 26, 2025.

== Reception ==
Kirkus Reviews published a positive review, describing the book as "sometimes wrenching but often funny." Publishers Weekly published a starred review, praising Toews' prose and the memoir's structure. Booklist also praised the book's structure. Naoise Dolan, writing in The Irish Times, was positive overall. She praised Toews' balance of delicate prose and humor but criticized the book's editing for missing what Dolan characterized as obvious mistakes. Blake Morrison wrote a positive review for The Guardian which also offered praise for Toews' comedy and the intimacy of the prose.

The Atlantic described the book as being the "culmination of Toews's career-long project of keeping her family members alive" in a positive review. The New York Times Book Review was similarly positive, comparing the book to Blue Nights by Joan Didion in its approach to grief. The Washington Independent Review of Books and The New York Review of Books both praised the book's prose, with the former describing it as "lyrical yet plainspoken" and the latter describing it as having a "bright, precise voice of indignation." The book was a finalist for the 2025 National Book Critics Circle Award for Autobiography.
