= Ballistic (film) =

2025 film by Chad Faust

- Theatrical release poster
- Directed by: Chad Faust
- Written by: Chad Faust
- Produced by: Thomas Michael
- Starring: Lena Headey; Hamza Haq; Amybeth McNulty; Jordan Kronis; Amanda Brugel; Enrico Colantoni
- Cinematography: Kristofer Bonnell
- Edited by: Mariana Urrutia
- Music by: Dillon Baldassero
- Production company: Fella Films
- Distributed by: Photon Films (Canada); Brainstorm Media (United States)
- Release dates: September 2025 (Cinéfest); April 17, 2026 (United States)
- Running time: 91 minutes
- Countries: Canada; United States
- Language: English
- Budget: $4 million

Ballistic is a 2025 action thriller film written and directed by Chad Faust and starring Lena Headey, Hamza Haq, Amybeth McNulty, Jordan Kronis, Amanda Brugel, and Enrico Colantoni. The film premiered at the 2025 Cinéfest Sudbury International Film Festival.

== Premise ==
A mother who works in a munitions factory discovers her son was killed in combat from a bullet made in her own factory.

== Cast ==
- Lena Headey as Nance Redfield
- Hamza Haq as Kahlil Nabizada
- Amybeth McNulty as Diana
- Jordan Kronis as Jesse Redfield
- Amanda Brugel as Galindo
- Enrico Colantoni as Rick Barber
- Chad Faust as SSG Buchanan

== Production ==
Producers are Thomas Michael of Fella Films and executive producers are David Tish and Lee Nelson of Envision Media Arts and Roman Kopelevich and Crystal Hill of Red Sea Media. The film was financed and executive produced by BondIt Media Capital. Lena Headey and Amybeth McNulty were cast as leads.

Principal photography began in Sudbury, Ontario in February 2024.

== Release ==
Brainstorm Media acquired the films US distribution rights. Photon Films secured the Canadian rights. The film was released in the United States in theaters and on digital on April 17, 2026.
