= Michelle Szemberg =

Canadian film editor

Michelle Szemberg is a Canadian film editor. She is most noted for the film All My Puny Sorrows, for which she and Orlee Buium won the Canadian Screen Award for Best Editing at the 10th Canadian Screen Awards in 2022.

The duo also won the Directors Guild of Canada's award for Best Editing in a Feature Film in 2021.

Her other credits have included the films For Dorian, No Stranger Than Love, Full Out, Natasha, Below Her Mouth, Kiss and Cry and Queen of the Morning Calm, and the television series Between, Backstage and Northern Rescue.
