= Black Medicine (film) =

- Directed by: Colum Eastwood
- Written by: Colum Eastwood
- Produced by: Janine Cobain
- Starring: Antonia Campbell-Hughes; Amybeth McNulty; Orla Brady
- Cinematography: Angus Mitchell
- Edited by: Fredrik Limi
- Music by: James Everett
- Distributed by: Signature Entertainment
- Release date: 18 July 2021
- Running time: 90 minutes
- Country: United Kingdom
- Language: English

Black Medicine is a 2021 British thriller film written and directed by Colum Eastwood and starring Antonia Campbell-Hughes, Amybeth McNulty and Orla Brady.

== Cast ==
- Antonia Campbell-Hughes as Jo
- Orla Brady as Bernadette
- Amybeth McNulty as Áine
- Julie Lamberton as Lucy
- Keith McErlean as Richard
- John Connors (actor) as Sean

== Release ==
The film was released on UK digital platforms on 18 July 2021.

== Reception ==
Phuong Le of The Guardian awarded the film two stars out of five.

Nikki Baughan of Screen International gave the film a positive review and wrote that it "is likely to attract modest attention for its performances and slick visual style."
