= The Corruption of Divine Providence =

- Directed by: Jeremy Torrie
- Written by: Jeremy Torrie
- Produced by: Tanya Brunel; Jeremy Torrie
- Starring: Ali Skovbye; Elyse Levesque; David La Haye
- Cinematography: Éric Cayla
- Edited by: Orlee Buium; Geoff Klein
- Music by: Alain Savoie
- Production company: White Bear Films
- Distributed by: Vortex Media
- Release date: October 16, 2020 (Reelworld)
- Running time: 96 minutes
- Country: Canada
- Languages: English; French

The Corruption of Divine Providence is a 2020 Canadian supernatural horror film, written, produced, and directed by Jeremy Torrie. Set in a small Métis community in Manitoba, the film centres on Jeanne Séraphin (Ali Skovbye), a teenage girl who becomes possessed in a spiritual battle between good and evil forces.

The cast also includes David La Haye and Elyse Levesque as Jeanne's parents Louis and Danielle, Corey Sevier as a Christian televangelist who becomes involved in Jeanne's case, and Paul Amos as Saint Francis, as well as Tantoo Cardinal, Eugene Brave Rock, Sera-Lys McArthur and Angela Narth in supporting roles.

The film premiered in October 2020 at the Reelworld Film Festival. It was subsequently screened at the 2020 Whistler Film Festival and the 2021 Canadian Film Festival, before being commercially released to video on demand platforms in May 2021. At Whistler, Skovbye and Levesque were named as Stars to Watch by the British Columbia chapter of ACTRA.
