= Silent Light =

- Film poster
- Directed by: Carlos Reygadas
- Written by: Carlos Reygadas
- Produced by: Carlos Reygadas; Jaime Romandia
- Starring: Elizabeth Fehr; Jacobo Klassen; Maria Pankratz; Miriam Toews; Cornelio Wall; Peter Wall
- Cinematography: Alexis Zabé
- Edited by: Natalia López
- Production companies: Nodream Cinema; Mantarraya Producciones
- Distributed by: Palisades Tartan; NDMantarraya
- Release dates: May 22, 2007 (Cannes Film Festival); December 20, 2007 (Mexico)
- Running time: 136 minutes
- Countries: Mexico; France; Netherlands; Germany
- Language: Plautdietsch

Silent Light (Plautdietsch: Stellet Licht) is a 2007 film written and directed by Carlos Reygadas. Filmed in a Mennonite colony close to Cuauhtémoc, Chihuahua State, Northern Mexico, Silent Light tells the story of a Mennonite married man who falls in love with another woman, threatening his place in the conservative community. The dialogue is in Plautdietsch, the Low German dialect of the Mennonites. The film was selected as the Mexican entry for the Best Foreign Language Oscar at the 80th Academy Awards, but it did not make the shortlist. The film was nominated for Best Foreign Film at the 24th Independent Spirit Awards. It gained nine nominations, including all major categories, in the Ariel Awards, the Mexican national awards.

Martin Scorsese described the work as "A surprising picture and a very moving one as well", while Barry Jenkins in 2019 named it as the best film of the 21st century. It was awarded the Jury Prize at the 2007 Cannes Film Festival. In 2017, the film was named the twenty-third "Best Film of the 21st Century So Far" by The New York Times.

== Plot ==
Silent Light begins with a long tracking shot of the sun rising over a beautiful plain. The protagonist Johan, his wife Esther, and their children sit silently saying grace, after which each member of Johan's family departs from their home except for him. Once he is alone, he stops the clock on the wall and breaks down crying. Johan goes to work and discusses with a colleague that he is having an affair with a single woman by the name of Marianne; he makes it clear that his wife knows about the affair. Johan leaves work to meet Marianne in a field, and they begin to kiss. In the next scene, Johan's children are bathing and playing along a riverbank while he and his wife watch. They call one of their children over to bathe her, and as they are doing so, Esther begins to cry.

Johan tells his father about the affair, but when they step outside to discuss it, the scene shows winter. No explanation is provided for the change of season. Johan's affair with Marianne continues; they have sex in a local hotel while Johan's children wait in a van with a stranger - someone whom Marianne seems to know and trust. As Johan is driving in his car with Esther, she confronts him about the affair. She says she is going to vomit and forces him to stop the car. She runs off taking a blue umbrella, telling him not to follow. She breaks down crying along the side of a field, has what the doctor later describes as "coronary trauma," and dies.

At her wake, friends and family are there to provide comfort. Johan visits the body, says his goodbyes, and goes outside for air. Marianne suddenly shows up at the wake and asks if she can spend a moment with Esther's body, which Johan allows. Marianne enters the room, slowly kisses Esther's body on the lips, and drops a tear on her cheek. Esther appears to return to life as Johan's father sets the clock on a nearby wall. Johan breaks down again, before one of his daughters says that "Mum wants to see him." Marianne leaves silently as Johan prepares to enter the room in which Esther waits. The final few minutes of Silent Light are another tracking shot, with the sun setting.

== Production ==
Carlos Reygadas' films are known for their long sequences, slow rhythm, and use of nonprofessional actors. Most of the performers in Silent Light are Mennonites from Chihuahua, Mexico, with the exception of two actors in the film. Maria Pankratz is German, while Miriam Toews is a Canadian author who grew up in the Mennonite community of Steinbach, Manitoba, and has written novels related to this culture. The film was an international co-production by companies from Mexico, France and the Netherlands.

== Reception ==
=== Critical response ===
On the review aggregator website Rotten Tomatoes, the film holds an approval rating of 85% based on 27 reviews. The website's consensus reads, "Silent Light demands patience -- and rewards willing viewers with a compassionate and beautifully filmed look at the human condition." On Metacritic, the film has a weighted average score of 79 out of 100, based on 14 critics, indicating "generally favorable reviews".

In the United States, Time magazine reviewer Mary Corliss praised the film's Minimalist aesthetic, writing: "This style has been responsible for many small, lugubrious films and — from directors who know how to make more of less — a few masterpieces. Silent Light is one of them." Manohla Dargis of The New York Times called the film "an apparently simple story about forgiving" in which "the images are of extraordinary beauty", and said that "The characters seem to be illuminated from the inside." The magazine Sight & Sound rated it number 6 on their list of the top films of 2007. Roger Ebert ranked the film one of the top ten independent films of 2009 as well as one of the best films of the 2000s. Jacques Mandelbaum of Le Monde gave the film a mixed review, writing that the film's stakes laid "in the encounter between the pantheistic tremor that underpins belief in Reygadas’s cinema and a Christian community whose faith has been shaken. Yet this conceptual aim overshadows the narrative too overtly, just as the love for the cinematic gesture itself seems to come at the expense of the characters. What remains is a majestic film that is, paradoxically, devoid of grace..."

Film Comment remarked on Silent Light's similarities to the film Ordet (1955) by Danish filmmaker Carl Theodor Dreyer. Among other elements, it features pastoral farm scenes, ticking clocks, slow pacing, silence, similarly named central characters (Johan and Johannes in Ordet), a focus on a large farm family, a protagonist questioning the strict piety of his minister father, the death of the protagonist's wife in seeming relation to her husband's transgression and, most saliently, the wife's apparent resurrection from the dead as brought about by a kiss. It is not a strict remake of Ordet, however, as there are numerous and substantive differences in plot. Also, Reygadas' film does not include the character of a prophetic son.

The film was nominated in nine categories, including all major ones, for the Ariel Awards in Mexico.

=== Top ten lists ===
The film appeared on several critics' top ten lists of the best films of 2008.

- 2nd - A. O. Scott, The New York Times
- 4th - Scott Foundas, LA Weekly
- 5th - Manohla Dargis, The New York Times
- 6th - David Ansen, Newsweek
- 6th - J. Hoberman, The Village Voice

=== Awards ===
- Bergen International Film Festival, Best Film
- Cannes Film Festival, Jury Prize
- Chicago International Film Festival, Gold Hugo (Best Feature)
- Cine Ceará - National Cinema Festival, Best Cinematography (Alexis ZabeBest)
- Cine Ceará - National Cinema Festival, Director (Carlos Reygadas)
- Cine Ceará - National Cinema Festival, Best Sound (Raúl Locatelli)
- Havana Film Festival, Best Cinematography (Alexis ZabeBest)
- Havana Film Festival, Best Director (Carlos Reygadas)
- Havana Film Festival, Best Sound (Raúl Locatelli)
- Havana Film Festival, Grand Coral - First Prize (Carlos Reygadas)
- Huelva Latin American Film Festival, Golden Colon (Best Feature)
- Huelva Latin American Film Festival, Silver Colon (Best Director)
- Lima Latin American Film Festival, Best Cinematography (Alexis ZabeBest)
- Lima Latin American Film Festival, Critics Award
- Lima Latin American Film Festival, Elcine First Prize
- Motovun Film Festival, Propeller of Motovun (Best Film)
- Rio de Janeiro International Film Festival, FIPRESCI Prize (Best Latin American Film)
- Stockholm International Film Festival, Best Screenplay

== Representation in other media ==
Some of the production of Silent Light appears in fictionalized form in the 2012 novel Irma Voth, written by award-winning Canadian author Miriam Toews. The novel is about a Mennonite teenager named Irma, whose isolated existence is transformed when she is hired by a bohemian film crew that comes to her settlement to make a film about Mennonites. Toews was inspired by her own experience on the set of Silent Light, in which she plays the role of Esther, Johan's wife. The "film-within-the-novel" is recognizably Silent Light. According to critic Catherine E. Wall, Toews' novel provides additional insight into the dynamics of conflict and cooperation between the Spanish-Mexican film crew and the ultra-conservative Mennonites of the Cuauhtémoc Settlement where filming took place.

== See also ==
- List of submissions to the 80th Academy Awards for Best Foreign Language Film
- List of Mexican submissions for the Academy Award for Best Foreign Language Film
