= Sally Catto =

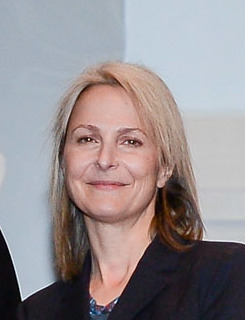
- Occupations: Lawyer, literary agent, television executives

Sally Catto is general manager for programming at the Canadian Broadcasting Corporation.

Catto has explained the balancing act she and her colleagues must tread, in choosing productions to fund that help preserve a Canadian identity.

In a profile in Playback magazine Catto described how her team had a mandate to take risks, when taking CBC programming in a new direction. The profile offered the recently broadcast Book of Negroes miniseries as an example of the success of this new initiative.

Prior to joining the CBC Catto worked as a lawyer, and as a literary agent. Prior to taking on responsibility for all programming Catto was a producer for several well-reviewed series, including Intelligence and Murdoch Mysteries.
