= Miriam Toews =

Canadian writer (born 1964)

Miriam Toews OC OM
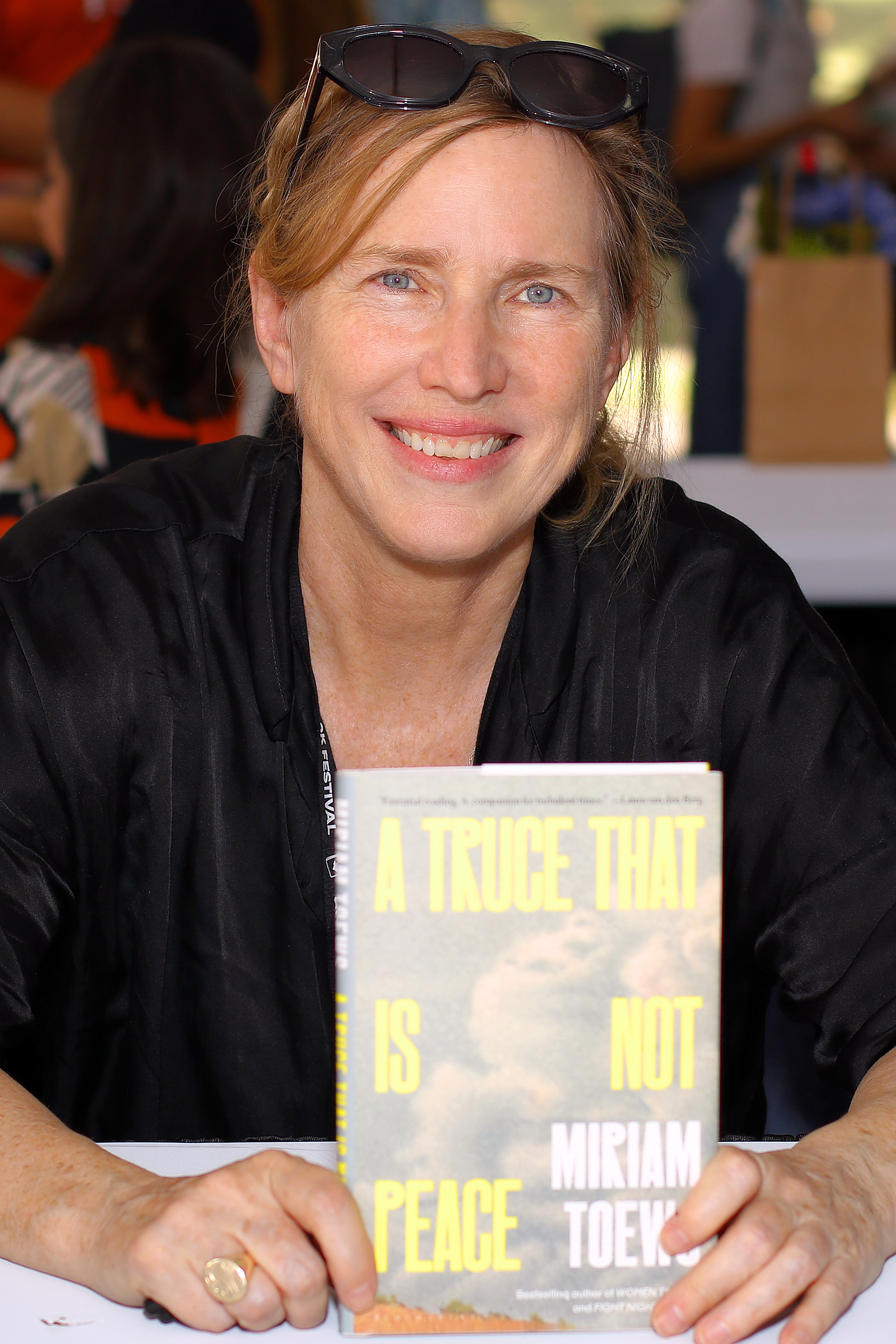
- Toews at the 2025 Texas Book Festival
- Born: May 21, 1964 (age 62); Steinbach, Manitoba, Canada
- Education: University of Manitoba; University of King's College
- Occupation: Novelist
- Partner: Erik Rutherford
- Children: Owen Toews; Georgia Toews
- Writing career
- Period: 1990s–present
- Notable works: A Complicated Kindness (2004); All My Puny Sorrows (2014); Women Talking (2018)

Miriam Toews (/teɪvz/; born May 21, 1964) is a Canadian writer and author of ten books, including A Complicated Kindness (2004), All My Puny Sorrows (2014), and Women Talking (2018). She has won a number of literary prizes including the Governor General's Award for Fiction and the Writers' Trust Engel/Findley Award for her body of work. Toews is also a three-time finalist for the Scotiabank Giller Prize and a two-time winner of the Rogers Writers' Trust Fiction Prize.

Toews had a leading role in the feature film Silent Light, written and directed by Mexican filmmaker Carlos Reygadas, and winner of the 2007 Cannes Jury Prize, an experience that informed her fifth novel, Irma Voth (2011). Her memoir A Truce That Is Not Peace was a finalist for the 2025 National Book Critics Circle Award for Autobiography.

Toews lives in Toronto and is an adjunct professor at the University of Toronto in the Faculty of Arts & Science.

== Early life ==
Toews grew up in Steinbach, Manitoba, Canada the second daughter of Mennonite parents, both part of the Kleine Gemeinde. Through her father, Melvin C. Toews, she is a direct descendant of one of Steinbach's first settlers, Klaas R. Reimer (1837–1906), who arrived in Manitoba in 1874 from Ukraine. Her mother, Elvira Loewen, is a daughter of the late C. T. Loewen, an entrepreneur who founded a lumber business that would become Loewen Windows. As a teenager, Toews rode horses and took part in provincial dressage and barrel-racing competitions and attended high school at the Steinbach Regional Secondary School. In 2024, a historic plaque was placed in front of Toews's teenage home in Steinbach.

Toews left Steinbach at eighteen, living in Montreal and London before settling in Winnipeg. She has a B.A. in Film Studies from the University of Manitoba, and a Bachelor of Journalism degree from the University of King's College, Halifax.

== Career ==
=== Early work ===
Toews wrote her first novel, Summer of My Amazing Luck (1996), while working as a freelance journalist. The novel explores the evolving friendship of two single mothers in a Winnipeg public housing complex. The novel was developed from a documentary that Toews was preparing for CBC Radio on the subject of welfare mothers. It was shortlisted for the Stephen Leacock Memorial Medal for Humour, and the McNally Robinson Book of the Year Award. Toews won the latter prize with her second novel, A Boy of Good Breeding (1998).

Toews has written for CBC's WireTap, Canadian Geographic, Geist, The Guardian, The New York Times Magazine, Intelligent Life, and Saturday Night. In 1999, she won a National Magazine Award Gold Medal for Humour. She is the author of The X Letters, a series of personal dispatches addressed to the father of her son, which were featured on This American Life in an episode about missing parents.

Toews' father died by suicide in 1998. His death inspired Toews to write a memoir in her father's voice, Swing Low: A Life. The book was greeted as an instant classic in the modern literature on mental illness, and it won the Alexander Kennedy Isbister Award for Non-Fiction and the McNally Robinson Book of the Year Award.

=== A Complicated Kindness ===
Toews' third novel, A Complicated Kindness (2004), is set in East Village, a small religious Mennonite town much like her native Steinbach. The narrator is Nomi Nickel, a curious, defiant, sardonic sixteen-year-old who dreams of hanging out with Lou Reed in the 'real' East Village of New York City. She lives alone with her doleful father, after the departure of her older sister and the unexplained disappearance of her mother. Unlike her father, who is a dutiful member of the church, Nomi is rebellious by nature, and her questioning brings her into conflict with the town's various authorities, most notably Hans Rosenfeldt, the sanctimonious church pastor.

A Complicated Kindness was highly acclaimed nationally and internationally, with the character of Nomi Nickel invoking comparisons to J. D. Salinger's Holden Caulfield. It won the 2004 Governor General's Award for Fiction, described by the jury as "an unforgettable coming-of-age story... melancholic and hopeful, as beautifully complicated as life itself." It was also shortlisted for the Scotiabank Giller Prize and longlisted for the International Dublin Literary Award. The novel was selected for the 2006 edition of Canada Reads, the first book by a female writer to win the competition.

=== The Flying Troutmans ===
The Flying Troutmans (2008) is a road-trip novel narrated by 28-year-old Hattie, who takes charge of her teenage niece and nephew after her sister Min is admitted to a psychiatric ward. Overwhelmed by the responsibility, Hattie enacts an ill-conceived plan to find the kids' long-lost father in California.

The novel was awarded the 2008 Rogers Writers' Trust Fiction Prize. The jury described the novel as "a love song to young people trying to navigate the volcanic world of adult emotions." The novel was also longlisted for the Orange Prize for Fiction, and named a Globe and Mail Best Book.

=== Irma Voth and Silent Light ===
With her fifth novel, Irma Voth (2011), Toews returned to the Mennonite community to reexamine the ways in which religious communities can limit personal freedom, and how belonging can turn to estrangement when old and new value systems clash. The novel opens in an old-order Mennonite settlement in Mexico's Chihuahuan Desert. Nineteen-year-old Irma Voth has been banished to a neighbouring farm by her strict, religious father after secretly marrying a non-Mennonite Mexican. Her new husband disappears into the drug trade and Irma is left alone to tend to the farm. Her world is transformed when a film-maker from Mexico City arrives to make a film about Mennonites. Irma is hired as a translator for the film's female protagonist, and her involvement with the wildly creative film crew brings her into dangerous conflict with her father, while at the same time helping her better understand her place in the world. When her father's violence escalates and the tragedy that has haunted her family begins to surface, Irma receives the blessing of her mother to flee the encampment, and to take her two younger sisters with her, one of whom is an infant. They eventually settle in Mexico City, where the two older sisters must embrace the ways of the city in order to survive and raise their infant sister.

Toews has said that Irma Voth was inspired in part by her experience in playing a lead role in Silent Light, the 2007 film written and directed by Mexican film-maker Carlos Reygadas. Reygadas invited Toews to do a screen test for the role of Esther, a conservative Mennonite wife, after reading her third novel, A Complicated Kindness, and seeing her author photo on the back flap of the book. The film was shot in Plautdietsch, a language neither the director nor Toews fully understood. Toews worked with her mother, a native speaker of Plautdietsch, to deliver her lines phonetically. The film won a number of international awards, including the Jury Prize at the Cannes Film Festival. Toews was nominated for Best Actress at Mexico's Ariel Awards for her performance, one of nine nominations for the film.

Filmed in the northern Mexican state of Chihuahua, the film depicts the same Mennonite community that features in Toews' novel. "Irma Voth and Silent Light provide interesting counterpoint views of a culture as seen through the eyes of an outsider. Of course Reygadas and the fictional film-maker in Irma Voth portray a society within its insular context, a culture out of time and place, while Toews and Irma Voth have learned to exist in both worlds."

=== All My Puny Sorrows ===
All My Puny Sorrows (2014) recounts the tumultuous relationship of the Von Riesen sisters, Elfrieda and Yolandi, the only children of an intellectual, free-spirited family from a conservative Mennonite community. Yolandi, the novel's narrator, has always lived in her sister's shadow. Whereas Elfrieda is a gifted, beautiful, happily married, and much celebrated concert pianist, Yolandi feels like a failure, with a floundering writing career and teenage children from separate fathers. Yet it is Elfrieda who suffers from acute depression and a desire to die, much like her father before her, who killed himself by stepping in front of a train. When Elfrieda makes a second suicide attempt on the eve of an international concert tour, Yolandi makes it her mission to save her sister, even as Elf begs her to accompany her to a Swiss clinic and enable her death. Yolandi writes: "She wanted to die and I wanted her to live and we were enemies who loved each other."

Toews has said that the novel draws heavily on events leading up to the 2010 suicide of her only sibling Marjorie.

All My Puny Sorrows received starred reviews in Library Journal, Kirkus Reviews, and Publishers Weekly and was a Reference and Users Services Association Notable Book. It also appeared on a number of year-end best-book lists, including The Globe and Mail, The Boston Globe, The Washington Post, The New Republic, and The Daily Telegraph. The novel won the 2014 Rogers Writers' Trust Fiction Prize. The jury described it as "a haunting novel of tremendous feeling, beautifully written and profoundly humane... Miriam Toews, a dazzling literary alchemist who manages to summon all the joyous and heart-breaking humanity of her characters, has produced a work of astonishing depth. Reading it is an unforgettable experience." The novel was also awarded Italy's 2015 Sinbad Prize for Foreign Fiction.

All My Puny Sorrows was shortlisted for the 2014 Scotiabank Giller Prize, the 2015 Folio Prize for Literature, and the 2015 Wellcome Book Prize. It was longlisted for the 2015 Andrew Carnegie Medal for Excellence in Fiction and the 2016 International Dublin Literary Award.

The novel's French translation, Pauvres petits chagrins, was selected for the 2019 edition of Quebec's Le Combat des livres, where it was defended by writer Deni Ellis Béchard.

A film adaptation of the book, directed by Michael McGowan, was released in 2021.

=== Women Talking ===
In a note at the start of Women Talking (2018), Toews describes the novel as "a reaction through fiction" to the historical events that took place between 2005 and 2009 on the Manitoba Colony, a remote Mennonite community in Bolivia. Girls and women would regularly wake up in the mornings to discover they had been sexually violated. The attacks were dismissed as "wild female imagination", or else attributed to ghosts or demons. Eventually it was discovered that a group of colony men had been spraying an anesthetic into neighboring houses at night, rendering everyone unconscious, and raping the women (infants, the elderly and close relatives included). The colony elders, deciding that the case was too difficult to handle themselves, called local police to take the perpetrators into custody.

Toews' novel centers on eight women of varying ages who, in the aftermath of such traumatic events, must determine what to do next. As they see it, they have three options: do nothing; stay and fight; or leave. The stakes are high, and they must come to a decision quickly. The colony men, who are away to post bail for the rapists, will soon be returning. Over the course of two days, in the privacy of a hayloft, the women have a series of fierce philosophical debates. They discuss how they will heal, protect their children, educate their sons, keep their faith, and forgive. The colony's bishop, Peters, has told them that if they refuse to forgive their offenders, they will be denied entry into heaven.

The novel is presented as the minutes of the women's meetings, which are taken by August Epp, the colony school-teacher (and the novel's narrator) who has returned to the community after being excommunicated. Unlike the women, he has experience of the outside world, and is able to read and write and speak English (the women speak only Plautdietsch, an unwritten dialect of East Low German). He performs his role of minute taker at the request of Ona Friesen, the object of his unrequited love and his childhood friend, who is one of the eight women in the hayloft. As time runs short for the women, and they begin to put their action plan into motion, August's story is also revealed.

The novel was a shortlisted finalist for the Governor General's Award for English-language fiction at the 2018 Governor General's Awards, and for the 2019 Trillium Book Award.

A film adaptation of the book, directed by Sarah Polley, and produced by and featuring Frances McDormand, Rooney Mara, and Claire Foy, was released in late 2022. At the 95th Academy Awards, Polley won the Oscar for Best Adapted Screenplay for her adaptation of Toews' novel.

=== Fight Night ===
Toews' eighth novel, Fight Night (2021), focuses on a multigenerational family of women living in Toronto: the feisty, tomboyish nine-year-old Swiv, her heavily pregnant mother (nicknamed Mooshie), and her spirited and extraordinarily lively grandmother Elvira. Recently expelled from school, Swiv helps her grandmother with bathing and chores, accompanies her around the city, and eventually travels with her to Fresno, California to meet members of their extended family. In exchange, Swiv learns about what it means to survive through the ups and downs of life, and of her grandmother's story of despair, betrayal, stolen agency, and joy. The novel's structure takes the form of a letter Swiv writes to her absent father about life in the close-knit (yet often dysfunctional) household. As Swiv records her thoughts and observations, Fight Night unspools the pain, laughter, and unconditional love in the three women's stories as they speak to what it takes to fight – painfully, joyously and ferociously – and survive in life.

== Personal life ==
Toews' father, Melvin C. Toews, suffered from bipolar disorder much of his life. He was an active and well-respected elementary school teacher who lobbied to establish Steinbach's first public library. After his death by suicide, the Steinbach Library Board opened the Melvin C. Toews Reading Garden on the grounds of the library he worked to create. Toews' older sister and only sibling, Marjorie, died by suicide in 2010, almost twelve years to the day after their father.

Toews' partner is Erik Rutherford, the screenwriter for the 2021 film Charlotte. Her daughter, Georgia Toews, and son, Owen Toews, are both writers. Georgia's debut novel, Hey, Good Luck Out There, was published in 2022, while Owen's Stolen City: Racial Capitalism and the Making of Winnipeg was published in 2019.

== Works ==
=== Novels ===
- Summer of My Amazing Luck (1996), Turnstone Press. ISBN 0-88801-205-5
- A Boy of Good Breeding (1998), Vintage Canada. ISBN 0-676-97719-7
- A Complicated Kindness (2004), Knopf Canada. ISBN 0-676-97613-1
- The Flying Troutmans (2008), Knopf Canada. ISBN 978-0-307-39749-2
- Irma Voth (2011), Knopf Canada. ISBN 978-0-307-40068-0
- All My Puny Sorrows (2014), Knopf Canada. ISBN 978-0-345-80800-4
- Women Talking (2018), Knopf Canada. ISBN 978-0-735-27396-2
- Fight Night (2021), Knopf Canada. ISBN 978-0-7352-8239-1

=== Non-fiction ===
- Swing Low: A Life (2000), a memoir about her father, published by Vintage Canada. ISBN 0-676-97718-9
- A Truce That Is Not Peace (2025), a memoir, published by Bloomsbury Publishing. ISBN 978-1-639-73474-0

=== Selected essays and anthology contributions ===
- Contribution to A/Cross Sections: New Manitoba Writing, a collection edited by Katherine Bitney and Andris Taskans.
- "Peace Shall Destroy Many" (2016), an essay about pacifism in Mennonite communities, published in Granta 137. Reprinted in The Best American Nonrequired Reading 2017, edited by Sarah Vowell.
- Contribution to Women, Walking: Notes on Lives in Motion, a collection about women's experiences of walking, edited by Zahra Ebrahim and Jane Farrow.

=== Radio contributions ===
- “The X Letters”, personal letters featured in “Tell It to the Void”, a segment of This American Life.

=== Forthcoming ===
- Examination for Discovery, a novel scheduled for publication in August 2027.

== Filmography ==
Year	Title	Director	Actress	Consultant	Notes
2007	Luz silenciosa	Carlos Reygadas	Yes	No	Role: Esther
2021	All My Puny Sorrows	Michael McGowan	No	No	Based on the novel of the same name.
2022	Women Talking	Sarah Polley	No	Yes	Based on the novel of the same name.

== Selected awards and honours ==
=== Literary awards won ===
- 1996: John Hirsch Award for Summer of My Amazing Luck.
- 1998: McNally Robinson Book of the Year Award for A Boy of Good Breeding.
- 2000: Alexander Kennedy Isbister Award for Non-Fiction for Swing Low: A Life.
- 2000: McNally Robinson Book of the Year Award for Swing Low: A Life.
- 2004: Governor General's Award for English-language fiction for A Complicated Kindness.
- 2004: McNally Robinson Book of the Year Award for A Complicated Kindness.
- 2004: Margaret Laurence Award for Fiction for A Complicated Kindness.
- 2005: Canadian Booksellers Association Libris Award for Fiction Book of the Year for A Complicated Kindness.
- 2006: Canada Reads winner for A Complicated Kindness.
- 2008: Rogers Writers' Trust Fiction Prize for The Flying Troutmans.
- 2014: Rogers Writers' Trust Fiction Prize for All My Puny Sorrows.
- 2015: Canadian Authors Association Award for Fiction for All My Puny Sorrows.
- 2015: Sinbad Prize for Foreign Fiction in Italy for I miei piccoli dispiaceri, the Italian translation of All My Puny Sorrows.

=== Shortlists and finalist nominations ===
- 2004: Scotiabank Giller Prize shortlist for A Complicated Kindness.
- 2012: Canadian Authors Association Award for Fiction finalist for Irma Voth.
- 2014: Scotiabank Giller Prize shortlist for All My Puny Sorrows.
- 2015: Folio Prize shortlist for All My Puny Sorrows.
- 2015: Wellcome Book Prize shortlist for All My Puny Sorrows.
- 2018: Governor General's Award for English-language fiction shortlist for Women Talking.
- 2021: Giller Prize shortlist for Fight Night.

=== Career honours and honorary degrees ===
- 2006: Honorary doctorate in literature from Brandon University.
- 2010: Writers' Trust Engel/Findley Award.
- 2010: Honorary doctorate in civil law from the University of King's College.
- 2013: Order of Manitoba.
- 2016: Writers' Trust of Canada Fellowship.
- 2025: Appointed an Officer of the Order of Canada.
