= Orlee Buium =

Canadian film editor

Orlee Buium is a Canadian film editor. She is most noted for the film All My Puny Sorrows, for which she and Michelle Szemberg won the Canadian Screen Award for Best Editing at the 10th Canadian Screen Awards in 2022.

The duo also won the Directors Guild of Canada's award for Best Editing in a Feature Film in 2021. She previously won the Canadian Cinema Editors Student Merit Award in 2012 for her work on Jeff Garneau's short film Young Love.

Her other credits have included the films Queen of the Morning Calm, The Corruption of Divine Providence, Run Woman Run, The Retreat and The Betrayers.
