= All My Puny Sorrows =

2014 novel

- Author: Miriam Toews
- Language: English
- Genre: Novel
- Publisher: Alfred A. Knopf
- Publication date: 2014
- Publication place: Canada
- Media type: Print (hardback & paperback)
- Preceded by: Irma Voth

All My Puny Sorrows is the sixth novel by Canadian writer Miriam Toews. The novel won the 2014 Rogers Writers' Trust Fiction Prize, and was shortlisted for the 2014 Scotiabank Giller Prize, the 2015 Folio Prize for Literature, and the 2015 Wellcome Book Prize. Toews has said that the novel draws heavily on the events leading up to the 2010 suicide of her sister, Marjorie.

== Plot ==
The novel recounts the tumultuous relationship of the Von Riesen sisters, Elfrieda and Yolandi, the only children of an intellectual, free-spirited family from a conservative Mennonite community. Yolandi, the novel's narrator, has always lived in her sister's shadow: whereas Elfrieda is a gifted, beautiful, happily married, and much celebrated concert pianist, Yolandi is something of a failure, with a floundering writing career and teenage children from separate fathers. Yet it is Elfrieda who suffers from acute depression and a desire to die, much like her father before her, who killed himself by stepping in front of a train. When Elfrieda makes a second suicide attempt on the eve of an international concert tour, Yolandi makes it her mission to save her sister, even as Elf begs her to accompany her to a Swiss clinic and enable her death. Yolandi writes: "She wanted to die and I wanted her to live and we were enemies who loved each other."

== Awards and recognition ==
It received starred reviews in Library Journal, Kirkus Reviews, and Publishers Weekly and was a Reference and Users Services Association Notable Book. It also appeared on a number of year-end best-book lists, including The Globe and Mail, The Boston Globe, The Washington Post, The New Republic, and The Daily Telegraph. Reviewing for The New York Times, Curtis Sittenfeld said the novel's "intelligence, its honesty and, above all, its compassion provide a kind of existential balm—a comfort not unlike the sort you might find by opening a bottle of wine and having a long conversation with (yes, really) a true friend." Margaret Atwood praised the novel, calling it a "high-wire act": "What do you do when your beloved and brilliant sister wants you to help her leave this world because she finds her existence too painful? How do you make that into a believable, excruciating but sometimes wildly funny work of fiction?" Naomi Klein described the novel as "shockingly funny, deeply wise and utterly heartbreaking."

All My Puny Sorrows won the 2014 Rogers Writers' Trust Fiction Prize. The jury described it as "a haunting novel of tremendous feeling, beautifully written and profoundly humane... Miriam Toews, a dazzling literary alchemist who manages to summon all the joyous and heart-breaking humanity of her characters, has produced a work of astonishing depth. Reading it is an unforgettable experience." The novel also won the 2015 Canadian Authors Association Award for Fiction and Italy's 2015 Sinbad Prize for Foreign Fiction.

All My Puny Sorrows was shortlisted for the 2014 Scotiabank Giller Prize, the 2015 Folio Prize for Literature, and the 2015 Wellcome Book Prize. It was longlisted for the 2015 Andrew Carnegie Medal for Excellence in Fiction and the 2016 International Dublin Literary Award.

Pauvres petits chagrins, the novel's French translation by Lori Saint-Martin and Paul Gagné, was a competing title in the 2019 edition of Le Combat des livres, where it was advocated by writer Deni Ellis Béchard.

All My Puny Sorrows, a film adaptation of the novel, commenced production on December 2, 2020, in North Bay, Ontario. The film, which was written, produced, and directed by Michael McGowan, stars Alison Pill, Sarah Gadon, Marin Almasi, Amybeth McNulty, Mare Winningham, Donal Logue, and Aly Mawji. It premiered at the 2021 Toronto International Film Festival.
