= A Complicated Kindness =

Canadian novel, 2004

- First edition cover
- Author: Miriam Toews
- Language: English
- Published: 2004 (Knopf Canada)
- Publication place: Canada
- Media type: Print (hardback & paperback)
- Pages: 256 pp (first edition, hardcover)
- ISBN: 0-676-97612-3 (first edition, hardcover), ISBN 0-571-22400-8 (first American edition, hardcover)
- OCLC: 53161860
- Preceded by: Swing Low: A Life
- Followed by: The Flying Troutmans

A Complicated Kindness (2004) is the third novel by Canadian author Miriam Toews. The novel won the Governor General's Award for English Fiction, the CBA Libris Fiction Award, and CBC's Canada Reads.

== Plot ==
The novel is set in a small religious Mennonite town called East Village, a fictionalized version of Toews' hometown of Steinbach, Manitoba. The narrator is Nomi Nickel, a curious, defiant, sardonic 16-year-old who dreams of hanging out with Lou Reed in the "real" East Village of New York City. She lives alone with her doleful father, Ray Nickel, who is a dutiful member of the Mennonite church. Nomi, on the other hand, is inquisitive by nature and her compulsive questioning brings her into conflict with the town's various authorities, most notably Hans Rosenfeldt, the sanctimonious church pastor.

As the story unfolds, it is revealed that Nomi's irreverent older sister Tash left town three years earlier with her boyfriend, Ian, and that Nomi's mother, Trudie, also left, though under more mysterious circumstances. Nomi is fiercely loyal to her father, and she comes to decide that she must stay in East Village for his sake.

Nomi senses that when she graduates from high school, all she'll be expected to do is work at the chicken processing plant and marry a boy from the community and become "good." She develops a relationship with Travis, who in the end is not the person he appears to be. She visits her good friend Lydia in the hospital, where she gets into confrontations with hospital staff. At school, she is met with obfuscation and anger by Mr. Quiring and other teachers and administrators. When Nomi lashes out in action or outrage, she is ignored or negated. Nomi's tragedy is the slow realization that not only will she fail to bring her family together, but she will also have to change her nature to find a place in the town she loves. In the end, her father Ray makes a heroic sacrifice so that she can be free.

== Major characters ==
- Nomi Nickel – The sixteen-year-old protagonist. She lives in a Mennonite community. She is full of curiosity and her sister calls her "Swivelhead," but her eagerness to understand is interpreted as defiance or criticism or deliberate subversion.
- Raymond "Ray" Nickel – Nomi's quiet, reserved father. He survives the unforgiving conformism of East Village by toeing the line and trying to be a perfect citizen. He is bewildered by his less obedient wife and daughters, but very much devoted to them. Inevitably, he is caught between the "laws" of the town and his love for his family.
- Natasha "Tash" Dawn Nickel – Nomi's older sister. She rejects the East Village community and its values. She isn't bothered by anybody's disapproval. She and her boyfriend, Ian, leave town in his Econoline van, happily headed for California.
- Gertrude "Trudie" Dora Nickel – Nomi's mother and Pastor Rosenfeldt's sister. She is overwhelmed by the pressure to be a model wife and citizen; her attempts to confront the 'system' only heighten her sense of entrapment. She leaves the town shortly after Natasha.
- Travis – Nomi's erstwhile boyfriend. He postures as a broad-minded Bohemian, but he proves himself to be another conventional townsman. Nomi has her first sexual experience with him.
- Hans "The Mouth" Rosenfeldt – Nomi's uncle, her mother's older brother. As the church pastor, he is a powerful, controlling presence in the community.
- Lydia "Lids" Voth – Nomi's good friend, from a more conservative Mennonite family. Nomi loves her because, unlike so many others in the community, she does not judge others. She is afflicted by a mysterious ailment that nobody can diagnose or treat effectively. She is eventually moved to a mental hospital.

== Awards ==
- 2004 Governor General's Award
- 2004 Giller Prize Finalist
- 2004 McNally Robinson Book of the Year Award
- 2004 The Margaret Laurence Award for Fiction
- 2005 Canadian Booksellers Association Libris Award for Fiction Book of the Year
- 2005 Canadian Library Association Young Adult Canadian Book Award
- 2005 Booktrust UK YoungMinds Book Award
- 2006 International Dublin Literary Award (longlist)
- 2006 Winner CBC Canada Reads
