= All My Puny Sorrows (film) =

2021 Canadian film by Michael McGowan

- Theatrical release poster
- Directed by: Michael McGowan
- Screenplay by: Michael McGowan
- Based on: All My Puny Sorrows by Miriam Toews
- Produced by: Michael McGowan; Patrice Theroux; Tyler Levine; Katelyn Cursio
- Starring: Alison Pill; Sarah Gadon; Amybeth McNulty; Mare Winningham
- Cinematography: Daniel Grant
- Edited by: Orlee Buium; Michelle Szemberg
- Music by: Jonathan Goldsmith
- Production companies: Mulmur Feed Co.; Sugar Shack Productions; Carousel Pictures
- Distributed by: Mongrel Media
- Release dates: September 10, 2021 (TIFF); April 15, 2022 (Canada)
- Running time: 103 minutes
- Country: Canada
- Language: English
- Budget: $5 million

All My Puny Sorrows is a 2021 Canadian drama film written, produced, and directed by Michael McGowan serving as an adaptation of the 2014 novel by Miriam Toews. It stars Alison Pill and Sarah Gadon as two Mennonite sisters who leave their religious lives behind. Amybeth McNulty, Mare Winningham, Donal Logue, and Aly Mawji also star in supporting roles, with Mongrel Media set to distribute the film. The film premiered at the Toronto International Film Festival on September 10, 2021, and was released in theaters in Canada on April 15, 2022. It received generally positive reviews from critics.

== Plot ==
Yolandi "Yoli" Von Riesen, a single mother, and unsuccessful author, receives a call that her sister, Elfrieda "Elf" Von Riesen, a successful concert pianist, has attempted suicide. The Von Riesen's have a history of suicide as their father killed himself years earlier.

Yoli attempts to be supportive but when Elf begs her to take her to Switzerland so that she can die by assisted suicide. Yoli grows angry and berates Elf for drowning in pain when she has a perfect life.

Yoli and Elf's aunt, Tina, has to go the hospital for surgery. While there Yoli tells Elf she has been looking into Switzerland but Elf tells her it is time to move away from that idea. Against Yoli's wishes Elf is released from the hospital.

Tina dies. Later, while out with her daughter, Yoli learns that Elf has died by jumping in front of a train, the same way their father chose to end his life.

The life insurance payout from Elf's death is enough to buy a house in Toronto and finish her latest book.

== Cast ==
- Alison Pill as Yolandi "Yoli" Von Riesen
  - Marin Almasi as Young Yoli
- Sarah Gadon as Elfrieda "Elf" Von Riesen, Yoli's younger sister
  - Gabrielle Jennings as Young Elf
- Amybeth McNulty as Nora Von Riesen
- Mare Winningham as Lottie Von Riesen
- Donal Logue as Jake Von Riesen
- Mimi Kuzyk as Tina Von Riesen, Yoli abd Elf's aunt
- Aly Mawji as Nic
- Martin Roach as Psychiatrist Johns

== Production ==
In December 2020, All My Puny Sorrows began filming in the midst of the COVID-19 pandemic in North Bay, Ontario. With a cast composed of Alison Pill, Sarah Gadon, Amybeth McNulty, Mare Winningham, Donal Logue, and Aly Mawji, filming wrapped that same month on December 16. Shot on a $5 million budget, the project was financed by multiple funding companies, including Telefilm Canada, the Northern Ontario Heritage Fund, and CBC Films. Jonathan Goldsmith composed the score for the film.

== Release ==
The film premiered at the 2021 Toronto International Film Festival, in the Special Presentations program. It was also screened as the opening film of the 2021 Cinéfest Sudbury International Film Festival and the 2021 Calgary International Film Festival.

== Reception ==
=== Critical response ===
On the review aggregator website Rotten Tomatoes, 73% of 40 reviews are positive, with an average rating of 6.3/10. The website's critical consensus reads, "A well-meaning but flawed adaptation of its source material, All My Puny Sorrows benefits from Alison Pill's searing performance." Metacritic, which uses a weighted average, assigned a score of 59 out of 100 based on 11 critics, indicating "mixed or average reviews".

=== Accolades ===
The Toronto International Film Festival listed the film in its annual year-end Canada's Top Ten list for 2021.

Accolades received by All My Puny Sorrows
Award	Date of ceremony	Category	Recipient(s)	Result	Ref.
Canadian Screen Awards	April 10, 2022	Best Art Direction / Production Design	Danny Haeberlin	Nominated	
Canadian Screen Awards	April 10, 2022	Best Cinematography	Daniel Grant	Nominated	
Canadian Screen Awards	April 10, 2022	Best Editing	Michelle Szemberg and Orlee Buium	Won	
Canadian Screen Awards	April 10, 2022	Best Original Score	Jonathan Goldsmith	Won	
Canadian Screen Awards	April 10, 2022	Best Casting in a Film	Heidi Levitt	Nominated	
Canadian Screen Awards	April 10, 2022	Best Sound Mixing	Joe Morrow, Lou Solakofski, Jonathan St. Clair, and Thomas Dube	Nominated	
Canadian Screen Awards	April 10, 2022	Best Sound Editing	Martin Gwynn Jones, Brent Pickett, Jane Tattersall, and Brennan Mercer	Nominated	
Canadian Screen Awards	April 10, 2022	Best Visual Effects	Alex Boothby	Nominated	
Cinéfest Sudbury International Film Festival	October 3, 2021	Outstanding Canadian Feature	All My Puny Sorrows	Won	
Directors Guild of Canada	October 23, 2021	Outstanding Directorial Achievement in Feature Film	Michael McGowan	Nominated	
Directors Guild of Canada	October 23, 2021	Best Picture Editing – Feature Film	Michelle Szemberg and Orlee Buium	Won	
Directors Guild of Canada	October 23, 2021	Best Sound Editing - Feature Film	Jane Tattersall, Martin Gwynn Jones, Brennan Mercer, Sue Fawcett, and Brent Pickett	Won	
Festival du Film Canadien de Dieppe	March 30, 2022	Best Film	Michael McGowan	Won	
Festival du Film Canadien de Dieppe	March 30, 2022	Best Actress	Alison Pill	Won	
Vancouver Film Critics Circle Awards	March 7, 2022	Best Canadian Film	All My Puny Sorrows	Won	
Vancouver Film Critics Circle Awards	March 7, 2022	Best Director of a Canadian Film	Michael McGowan	Nominated	
Vancouver Film Critics Circle Awards	March 7, 2022	Best Screenplay for a Canadian Film	Michael McGowan	Won	
Vancouver Film Critics Circle Awards	March 7, 2022	Best Actress in a Canadian Film	Alison Pill	Won	
Vancouver Film Critics Circle Awards	March 7, 2022	Best Supporting Actress in a Canadian Film	Sarah Gadon	Won	
