= The Gene: An Intimate History =

Book

- Cover of The Gene: An Intimate History
- Author: Siddhartha Mukherjee
- Language: English
- Subject: Genetics
- Publisher: Scribner
- Publication date: 17 May 2016
- Publication place: United States
- Pages: 592
- ISBN: 978-1-4767-3350-0 (Hardcover)

The Gene: An Intimate History is a book written by Siddhartha Mukherjee, an Indian-born American physician and oncologist. It was published on 17 May 2016 by Scribner. The book chronicles the history of the gene and genetic research, all the way from Aristotle to Crick, Watson and Franklin and then the 21st century scientists who mapped the human genome. The book discusses the power of genetics in determining people's well-being and traits. It delves into the personal genetic history of Siddhartha Mukherjee's family, including mental illness. However, it is also a cautionary message toward not letting genetic predispositions define a person or their fate, a mentality that the author says led to the rise of eugenics in history.

== Awards and honours ==
- 2016: Royal Society Prizes for Science Books shortlist
- 2016: Baillie Gifford Prize for Non-Fiction longlist
- 2016: Washington Post's "10 Best Books of 2016", The Gene.
- 2016: Goodreads Choice Award Nominee for Science & Technology
- 2017: Wellcome Book Prize shortlist
- 2017: PEN/E.O. Wilson Prize for Literary Science Writing Nominee for Longlist
- 2017: Phi Beta Kappa Society Book Award in Science

== PBS documentary ==
A documentary has been produced by Ken Burns with the same title The Gene: An Intimate History in 2020. Siddhartha Mukherjee served as a key commentator in the said documentary.

=== Episode 1 ===
In 2014, He Jiankui had intentionally altered the gene in the embryo of twin girls in the People's Republic of China. David Baltimore pontificates that it wasn't "medically necessary." Francis Collins says it would have been illegal in the United States.

KIF1A is a gene that make motor protein in the body.

The idea that in each sperm or egg is a tiny person is known as pre-formationism. Theodor Boveri was an early biologist studying chromosomes in 1900s. Later, Danish researcher Wilhelm Johannsen called the sites of heredity on chromosomes "genes."

Thomas Morgan discovers that some traits are linked in fruit flies.

David Botstein sought to trace the gene causing Huntington's disease. Genetic markers allow us to track genes. Eventually, biologists found the CAG chemical phrase on human Chromosome 4 responsible for Huntington's disease.

In 1971, Paul Berg conducted experiments in which he used "bacterial scissors."

In 1975, the Asilomar Conference on Recombinant DNA was held to discuss the implications of preventing and curing genetic diseases. One interviewee in the 1970s wondered if recombinant DNA experiments could produce "Frankensteins."

Venture capitalist Bob Swanson meets with Herbert Boyer in the 1970s to lay out his vision for Genentech. Their first drug would be insulin to help diabetic people.

=== Episode 2 ===
By the 1980s, scientists had only uncovered about 100 actual genes. In 1986, hundreds of biologists convene at the Cold Spring Harbor Laboratory (CSHL) in Long Island, New York, to discuss a plan to read out the entire human genome. In the late 1970s, Frederick Sanger and Walter Gilbert had pioneered DNA sequencing.

Bernadine Healy was the NIH director at the inception of the Human Genome Project.

François Jacob and Jacques Monod were working in Paris in the 1950s and 1960s; their goal was to understand transcription (going from DNA to RNA).

SMN2 is a gene that when mutated can cause spinal muscular atrophy (SMA).

Although some genetic diseases are caused by defect in a single gene, Richard Klausner points out that the situation gets complicated because some diseases are caused by defects in many genes. David B. Goldstein (geneticist) says that there are over 100 genes that increase the risk of schizophrenia.

In 2013, Lettie Lassiter was diagnosed with stage 4 gallbladder cancer. Later, this cancer spreads to her brain!

Nusinersen is a medication used in treating spinal muscular atrophy (SMA).

Jesse Gelsinger who was going to die because of a liver disease known as OTC (Ornithine transcarbamylase deficiency) agreed to receive gene therapy from James Wilson. The therapy didn't succeed and Gelsinger died anyway.

Eric Lander explain that bacteria can edit DNA.

CRISPR is like a "biometric identification system" according to Samuel H. Sternberg. Emmanuelle Charpentier and Jennifer Doudna have collaborated on CRISPR work.

A dwarf mother has a "precarious feeling" that CRISPR may be used to produce children with normal heights; she prefers having dwarf children like she is.

He Jiankui has been vilified for editing the genes of Lulu and Nana to give them protection against HIV. He Jiankui, who is interviewed in this documentary, vouches that his sole objective "was to prevent HIV infection. The girls are safe, healthy." He had performed pre-implantation genetic diagnosis (PGD). His competitor peers had hostile questions for He at a conference. Aside from He's Chinese peers, Eric Lander calls He's breakthrough "unethical."

=== Cast ===
- Wendy Chung
- Andrew Berry (biologist)
- Robin Marantz Henig
- Eric Lander
- Matthew Cobb
- Shirley Tilghman
- Adam Cohen (scientist)
- Nancy Wexler
- James F. Gusella
- Ellen Jorgensen
- Richard Klausner
- Arthur Caplan
- Edward Wild (Huntington's Disease Centre)
- Matt Ridley
- Craig Venter
- Aristides Patrinos
- Thomas O. Crawford, neurologist
- Adrian R. Krainer
- Kenneth Fischbeck
- Matthew Wood, Professor of Neuroscience at the University of Oxford
- Stacey Gabriel, Broad Institute
- David B. Goldstein (geneticist)
- Luis A. Diaz
- Haritha Pabbathi
- Matthew Cobb
- Joseph L. Graves Jr.
- James Wilson (scientist)
- Alexis Thompson, Feinberg School of Medicine
- Erica Esrick, MD
- Jennifer Doudna
- Henry Greely
- Feng Zhang
- Alondra Nelson
- He Jiankui

== Reviews ==
Bryan Appleyard of The Sunday Times called it "Dramatic and precise... thrilling and comprehensive account of what seems certain to be the most radical, controversial and, to borrow from the subtitle, intimate science of our time. He is a natural storyteller... A page-turner... Read this book and steel yourself for what comes next."

Andrew Solomon wrote in the Washington Post: "With a marriage of architectural precision and luscious narrative, an eye for both the paradoxical detail and the unsettling irony, and a genius for locating the emotional truths buried in chemical abstractions, Mukherjee leaves you feeling as though you’ve just aced a college course for which you’d been afraid to register – and enjoyed every minute of it."

== Criticism and response ==
In his 2016 article 'Same but different', an excerpt from the chapter "The First Derivative of Identity" of this book, in The New Yorker, he attributed the most important genetic functions to epigenetic factors (such as histone modification and DNA methylation).

"Chance events—injuries, infections, infatuations; the haunting trill of that particular nocturne—impinge on one twin and not on the other. Genes are turned on and off in response to these events, as epigenetic marks are gradually layered above genes, etching the genome with its own scars, calluses, and freckles."

This analogy based on his mother and her twin sister, who have distinct personalities, was critiqued by geneticists such as Mark Ptashne, at the Memorial Sloan Kettering Cancer Center, and John Greally, at the Albert Einstein College of Medicine, because of over emphasis on histone modification and DNA methylation, when they really are only minor contributors. Steven Henikoff, at the Fred Hutchinson Cancer Research Center, opined that, "Mukherjee seemed not to realize that transcription factors occupy the top of the hierarchy of epigenetic information... histone modifications at most act as cogs in the machinery." In response, Mukherjee did admit "he now realizes that he erred by omitting key areas of the science, but that he didn’t mean to mislead. 'I sincerely thought that I had done it justice.' "
