= Regeneron Science Talent Search =

National science competition in the United States

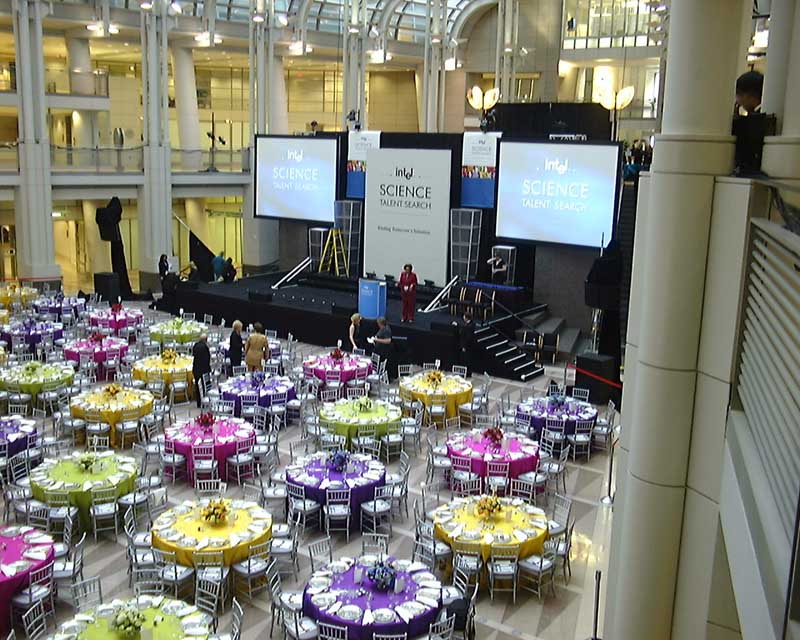
- 2002 finalist banquet at the Ronald Reagan Building in Washington, D.C.
- Location: Washington, D.C.
- Country: United States
- Formerly called: Westinghouse Science Talent Search (1942–1998); Intel Science Talent Search (1999–2016)
- Website: Society for Science page

The Regeneron Science Talent Search, known from its establishment in 1942 to 1998 as the Westinghouse Science Talent Search and from 1999 to 2016 as the Intel Science Talent Search, is a research-based science competition in the United States for high school seniors hosted by the Society for Science. It has been referred to as "the nation's oldest and most prestigious" science competition and several of its alumni have gone on to be scientists prominent in their fields. In his speech at a dinner honoring the 1991 winners, President George H. W. Bush called the competition the "Super Bowl of science."

== History ==
While attending the 1939 New York World's Fair, Society for Science director Watson Davis met Edward Pendray, a Westinghouse Electric Corporation executive. Together, they brainstormed ways to encourage youth to go into scientific fields and expand science fair competitions to the national level, and created the Westinghouse Science Talent Search (Westinghouse STS). The first competition was held in 1942, won by Paul Teschan of Shorewood, Wisconsin and Marina Meyers of Farmingdale, New York. Throughout an era of sexism in academia, the competition has always allowed male and female students to compete, though awards were given separately until 1949.

In 1998, Intel outbid several other potential sponsors and became the competition's sponsor; the name of the competition was changed from the Westinghouse Science Talent Search to the Intel Science Talent Search (Intel STS). In May 2016, it was announced that Regeneron Pharmaceuticals would be the new title sponsor. Since its founding, some 147,000 students have entered the competition. Over 22,000 have been named semifinalists and 2,920 have traveled to Washington, D.C., as contest finalists. Collectively, they have received millions of dollars in scholarships and gone on to later receive MacArthur Fellowships (20 alumni), Nobel Prizes (13 alumni), National Medals of Science (eleven alumni), the Breakthrough Prize (seven alumni), the Fields Medal (two alumni), the Lasker Award (two alumni) and numerous other accolades. Multiple alumni were later elected to the National Academy of Sciences and the National Academy of Engineering, and many have served in various government positions and as professors at top universities. Actress Natalie Portman was a semifinalist in 1998 and 1947 participant Leon Cooper's name was borrowed for Sheldon Cooper, a character on The Big Bang Theory who is portrayed as being a science prodigy.

== Competition ==
Entrants to the competition conduct original research — sometimes at home and sometimes by working with research teams at universities, hospitals and private laboratories. The selection process is highly competitive, and a research paper, letters of recommendation, essays, test scores, extracurricular activities, and high school transcripts are factored in the selection of finalists and winners.

=== Prizes ===
Each year, approximately 2,000 projects are submitted. The top 300 scholars (previously called semifinalists or honorable mentions) are announced in mid-January and each receive $2,000. In addition to the scholar award prize money, each scholar's school receives an award of $2,000 from the title sponsor for each scholar named. In late January, the top 40 finalists (the award winners) are announced. In March, finalists are flown to Washington, D.C., for a week, where they are interviewed by a judging panel about their projects and to assess their STEM knowledge, creativity and problem-solving abilities. Past judges have included Glenn T. Seaborg and Joseph Hooton Taylor, Jr., both Nobel laurates. The top 40 finalists each receive prizes starting at $25,000 and the winners are announced at an awards ceremony.

Prizes (as of 2026)
| Award | Prize |
|---|---|
| 1st place | $250,000 |
| 2nd place | $175,000 |
| 3rd place | $150,000 |
| 4th place | $100,000 |
| 5th place | $90,000 |
| 6th place | $80,000 |
| 7th place | $70,000 |
| 8th place | $60,000 |
| 9th place | $50,000 |
| 10th place | $40,000 |
| 30 finalists | $25,000 |
| 300 scholars | $2,000 |

== Demography ==
The Science Talent Search is open to high school seniors living in the United States, and US citizens living abroad. Since the beginning of the competition, a large number of winners have come from New York, representing nearly one-third of the finalists in the years that Westinghouse sponsored the competition. New York has continued to lead the states in finalists in more recent years, more closely followed by California, and with significant numbers of finalists from Maryland, Texas, Massachusetts, New Jersey, Florida, Virginia, and Illinois.

Top states for finalists
| State | Total finalists | Westinghouse (1942–1998) | Intel (1999–2016) | Regeneron (2017–2026) |
|---|---|---|---|---|
| New York | 1043 | 752 | 215 | 76 |
| California | 339 | 163 | 103 | 73 |
| Illinois | 174 | 149 | 24 | 1 |
| Pennsylvania | 134 | 101 | 18 | 15 |
| New Jersey | 132 | 87 | 24 | 21 |
| Maryland | 127 | 65 | 45 | 17 |
| Florida | 125 | 84 | 24 | 16 |
| Virginia | 121 | 82 | 16 | 23 |
| Texas | 111 | 54 | 32 | 25 |
| Massachusetts | 110 | 68 | 24 | 18 |
| Ohio | 93 | 78 | 10 | 5 |
| Oregon | 61 | 30 | 20 | 11 |
| Wisconsin | 60 | 48 | 9 | 3 |
| Michigan | 59 | 37 | 15 | 7 |
| Connecticut | 57 | 30 | 18 | 9 |
| Indiana | 56 | 43 | 9 | 4 |

Finalists by state (1942–2026)
| State | 1942 | 1943 | 1944 | 1945 | 1946 | 1947 | 1948 | 1949 | 1950 | 1951 | 1952 | 1953 | 1954 | 1955 | 1956 | 1957 | 1958 | 1959 | 1960 | 1961 | 1962 | 1963 | 1964 | 1965 | 1966 | 1967 | 1968 | 1969 | 1970 | 1971 | 1972 | 1973 | 1974 | 1975 | 1976 | 1977 | 1978 | 1979 | 1980 | 1981 | 1982 | 1983 | 1984 | 1985 | 1986 | 1987 | 1988 | 1989 | 1990 | 1991 | 1992 | 1993 | 1994 | 1995 | 1996 | 1997 | 1998 | 1999 | 2000 | 2001 | 2002 | 2003 | 2004 | 2005 | 2006 | 2007 | 2008 | 2009 | 2010 | 2011 | 2012 | 2013 | 2014 | 2015 | 2016 | 2017 | 2018 | 2019 | 2020 | 2021 | 2022 | 2023 | 2024 | 2025 | 2026 |
|---|---|---|---|---|---|---|---|---|---|---|---|---|---|---|---|---|---|---|---|---|---|---|---|---|---|---|---|---|---|---|---|---|---|---|---|---|---|---|---|---|---|---|---|---|---|---|---|---|---|---|---|---|---|---|---|---|---|---|---|---|---|---|---|---|---|---|---|---|---|---|---|---|---|---|---|---|---|---|---|---|---|---|---|---|---|
| Alabama | 0 | 0 | 2 | 0 | 0 | 0 | 0 | 0 | 0 | 0 | 0 | 0 | 0 | 0 | 0 | 0 | 1 | 0 | 0 | 0 | 0 | 0 | 0 | 0 | 0 | 0 | 0 | 1 | 0 | 0 | 1 | 0 | 1 | 0 | 0 | 0 | 0 | 0 | 1 | 1 | 1 | 1 | 0 | 0 | 1 | 0 | 1 | 0 | 0 | 2 | 0 | 0 | 1 | 0 | 0 | 0 | 0 | 0 | 0 | 0 | 1 | 0 | 0 | 0 | 1 | 1 | 0 | 0 | 1 | 0 | 0 | 0 | 0 | 0 | 0 | 0 | 0 | 0 | 0 | 0 | 0 | 0 | 1 | 0 | 0 |
| Alaska | 0 | 0 | 0 | 0 | 0 | 0 | 0 | 0 | 0 | 0 | 0 | 0 | 0 | 0 | 0 | 0 | 0 | 0 | 0 | 0 | 0 | 0 | 0 | 1 | 0 | 0 | 0 | 0 | 0 | 1 | 1 | 0 | 0 | 0 | 0 | 0 | 0 | 0 | 0 | 0 | 0 | 0 | 0 | 0 | 0 | 0 | 0 | 0 | 0 | 0 | 0 | 0 | 0 | 0 | 0 | 0 | 0 | 0 | 0 | 0 | 0 | 0 | 0 | 0 | 0 | 0 | 0 | 0 | 0 | 0 | 0 | 0 | 0 | 0 | 0 | 0 | 0 | 0 | 0 | 0 | 0 | 0 | 0 | 0 | 0 |
| Arizona | 0 | 0 | 1 | 1 | 0 | 0 | 1 | 0 | 1 | 0 | 2 | 1 | 1 | 0 | 2 | 1 | 1 | 0 | 2 | 1 | 2 | 1 | 1 | 0 | 1 | 0 | 0 | 0 | 0 | 0 | 0 | 1 | 0 | 0 | 0 | 0 | 0 | 0 | 0 | 0 | 0 | 0 | 0 | 0 | 0 | 0 | 0 | 0 | 0 | 0 | 0 | 0 | 0 | 0 | 0 | 0 | 1 | 0 | 0 | 0 | 1 | 0 | 0 | 1 | 1 | 0 | 0 | 1 | 0 | 1 | 0 | 0 | 0 | 1 | 0 | 0 | 0 | 0 | 1 | 0 | 1 | 1 | 2 | 0 | 1 |
| Arkansas | 0 | 0 | 0 | 0 | 0 | 0 | 0 | 0 | 0 | 0 | 0 | 0 | 0 | 0 | 0 | 0 | 0 | 0 | 1 | 0 | 0 | 0 | 0 | 0 | 0 | 0 | 0 | 0 | 0 | 0 | 0 | 0 | 0 | 0 | 0 | 0 | 0 | 1 | 1 | 0 | 0 | 0 | 0 | 0 | 1 | 0 | 0 | 1 | 0 | 0 | 0 | 0 | 0 | 0 | 0 | 0 | 0 | 0 | 1 | 0 | 0 | 0 | 0 | 0 | 0 | 0 | 0 | 0 | 0 | 0 | 0 | 0 | 0 | 0 | 0 | 0 | 0 | 0 | 0 | 0 | 1 | 0 | 0 | 0 | 0 |
| California | 3 | 2 | 1 | 1 | 5 | 3 | 3 | 3 | 2 | 4 | 3 | 3 | 2 | 3 | 4 | 1 | 4 | 3 | 2 | 0 | 5 | 5 | 3 | 3 | 1 | 3 | 5 | 4 | 2 | 2 | 3 | 4 | 2 | 5 | 3 | 1 | 3 | 3 | 5 | 4 | 4 | 0 | 1 | 3 | 3 | 1 | 3 | 1 | 4 | 3 | 4 | 2 | 1 | 3 | 6 | 2 | 4 | 5 | 4 | 4 | 1 | 2 | 3 | 4 | 3 | 3 | 0 | 5 | 8 | 11 | 10 | 7 | 12 | 11 | 10 | 6 | 7 | 8 | 2 | 9 | 7 | 9 | 8 | 6 | 10 |
| Colorado | 0 | 0 | 0 | 0 | 1 | 0 | 1 | 0 | 0 | 0 | 0 | 0 | 0 | 1 | 0 | 1 | 0 | 2 | 0 | 1 | 0 | 0 | 0 | 0 | 1 | 1 | 0 | 0 | 0 | 1 | 1 | 1 | 1 | 0 | 0 | 0 | 2 | 1 | 0 | 0 | 0 | 0 | 0 | 0 | 0 | 1 | 0 | 0 | 0 | 1 | 0 | 1 | 1 | 0 | 0 | 1 | 1 | 1 | 0 | 0 | 1 | 0 | 0 | 0 | 1 | 1 | 0 | 0 | 0 | 0 | 0 | 1 | 0 | 1 | 0 | 0 | 3 | 0 | 1 | 0 | 0 | 1 | 1 | 0 | 1 |
| Connecticut | 0 | 1 | 0 | 0 | 2 | 2 | 1 | 0 | 1 | 0 | 1 | 0 | 2 | 3 | 0 | 0 | 0 | 0 | 1 | 0 | 0 | 1 | 0 | 1 | 0 | 0 | 1 | 0 | 1 | 0 | 0 | 1 | 0 | 0 | 0 | 0 | 1 | 0 | 1 | 1 | 1 | 0 | 1 | 0 | 1 | 1 | 0 | 0 | 1 | 1 | 0 | 1 | 1 | 0 | 0 | 0 | 0 | 1 | 0 | 2 | 1 | 2 | 1 | 0 | 2 | 1 | 0 | 1 | 1 | 2 | 1 | 1 | 1 | 0 | 1 | 2 | 0 | 0 | 1 | 2 | 0 | 2 | 1 | 0 | 1 |
| Delaware | 0 | 0 | 0 | 0 | 0 | 0 | 0 | 0 | 0 | 0 | 0 | 0 | 0 | 1 | 0 | 0 | 0 | 0 | 0 | 0 | 0 | 0 | 0 | 0 | 0 | 0 | 1 | 0 | 0 | 0 | 0 | 0 | 0 | 0 | 0 | 0 | 0 | 0 | 0 | 0 | 0 | 0 | 0 | 0 | 0 | 0 | 0 | 0 | 0 | 0 | 0 | 0 | 1 | 0 | 0 | 0 | 1 | 0 | 0 | 0 | 0 | 0 | 0 | 0 | 0 | 0 | 1 | 0 | 0 | 0 | 0 | 0 | 0 | 0 | 0 | 0 | 0 | 1 | 0 | 1 | 1 | 0 | 1 | 0 | 0 |
| District of Columbia | 0 | 0 | 1 | 0 | 1 | 1 | 0 | 2 | 0 | 0 | 1 | 0 | 1 | 0 | 1 | 0 | 1 | 0 | 1 | 1 | 0 | 1 | 0 | 0 | 0 | 1 | 0 | 0 | 1 | 0 | 0 | 0 | 0 | 0 | 0 | 0 | 0 | 0 | 0 | 0 | 0 | 0 | 0 | 0 | 0 | 0 | 0 | 0 | 0 | 0 | 0 | 0 | 0 | 0 | 0 | 0 | 0 | 0 | 1 | 0 | 0 | 1 | 1 | 0 | 0 | 0 | 0 | 0 | 0 | 0 | 0 | 0 | 0 | 0 | 0 | 0 | 0 | 0 | 0 | 0 | 0 | 0 | 0 | 0 | 0 |
| Florida | 0 | 1 | 1 | 0 | 0 | 0 | 0 | 0 | 0 | 0 | 0 | 0 | 0 | 0 | 0 | 0 | 1 | 0 | 2 | 2 | 5 | 2 | 2 | 1 | 1 | 2 | 2 | 3 | 1 | 3 | 4 | 2 | 1 | 3 | 1 | 4 | 0 | 2 | 2 | 3 | 0 | 4 | 1 | 3 | 4 | 2 | 3 | 1 | 0 | 1 | 1 | 1 | 1 | 3 | 3 | 2 | 3 | 1 | 2 | 2 | 0 | 5 | 0 | 4 | 1 | 0 | 1 | 1 | 0 | 2 | 1 | 1 | 0 | 1 | 2 | 3 | 2 | 0 | 1 | 1 | 2 | 3 | 2 | 2 | 0 |
| Georgia | 0 | 0 | 1 | 0 | 0 | 0 | 0 | 0 | 0 | 0 | 1 | 2 | 0 | 0 | 1 | 1 | 0 | 0 | 0 | 2 | 0 | 2 | 0 | 1 | 2 | 1 | 0 | 0 | 1 | 0 | 1 | 0 | 0 | 1 | 0 | 1 | 0 | 0 | 0 | 0 | 1 | 0 | 1 | 0 | 1 | 0 | 1 | 0 | 0 | 0 | 1 | 0 | 0 | 0 | 0 | 0 | 0 | 1 | 0 | 2 | 0 | 0 | 1 | 1 | 0 | 0 | 1 | 0 | 0 | 0 | 1 | 2 | 1 | 0 | 0 | 0 | 0 | 1 | 0 | 0 | 1 | 0 | 0 | 0 | 0 |
| Hawaii | 0 | 0 | 0 | 0 | 0 | 0 | 0 | 0 | 0 | 0 | 0 | 0 | 0 | 0 | 0 | 0 | 0 | 0 | 0 | 0 | 0 | 1 | 0 | 0 | 0 | 0 | 0 | 0 | 0 | 0 | 1 | 2 | 0 | 2 | 0 | 1 | 1 | 0 | 1 | 0 | 0 | 0 | 0 | 0 | 0 | 0 | 0 | 0 | 1 | 0 | 0 | 1 | 0 | 0 | 0 | 0 | 0 | 1 | 1 | 0 | 0 | 1 | 0 | 0 | 0 | 0 | 1 | 0 | 0 | 0 | 0 | 0 | 1 | 0 | 0 | 0 | 1 | 0 | 0 | 0 | 0 | 0 | 0 | 1 | 0 |
| Idaho | 1 | 0 | 0 | 0 | 0 | 0 | 0 | 0 | 1 | 0 | 0 | 0 | 0 | 0 | 0 | 0 | 0 | 0 | 0 | 1 | 0 | 0 | 0 | 0 | 0 | 0 | 0 | 1 | 0 | 0 | 0 | 0 | 1 | 0 | 0 | 0 | 0 | 0 | 0 | 0 | 0 | 0 | 0 | 0 | 0 | 0 | 0 | 0 | 0 | 0 | 0 | 0 | 0 | 0 | 0 | 0 | 0 | 0 | 0 | 0 | 0 | 0 | 0 | 0 | 1 | 0 | 0 | 0 | 0 | 0 | 0 | 0 | 0 | 0 | 1 | 0 | 0 | 0 | 0 | 0 | 0 | 0 | 0 | 0 | 0 |
| Illinois | 3 | 3 | 2 | 6 | 4 | 4 | 3 | 2 | 0 | 1 | 4 | 2 | 3 | 5 | 3 | 5 | 3 | 4 | 4 | 4 | 2 | 1 | 1 | 4 | 2 | 4 | 3 | 4 | 7 | 6 | 2 | 2 | 1 | 3 | 3 | 0 | 3 | 2 | 2 | 2 | 5 | 1 | 2 | 3 | 0 | 5 | 2 | 3 | 1 | 2 | 2 | 1 | 0 | 0 | 0 | 2 | 1 | 1 | 0 | 0 | 5 | 0 | 0 | 4 | 3 | 1 | 0 | 2 | 2 | 1 | 2 | 1 | 1 | 1 | 0 | 0 | 0 | 0 | 0 | 0 | 0 | 1 | 0 | 0 | 0 |
| Indiana | 3 | 0 | 0 | 0 | 0 | 0 | 1 | 0 | 1 | 0 | 2 | 2 | 1 | 1 | 3 | 3 | 1 | 2 | 2 | 2 | 0 | 0 | 1 | 0 | 2 | 1 | 1 | 1 | 0 | 0 | 1 | 1 | 0 | 0 | 1 | 2 | 0 | 0 | 1 | 0 | 1 | 1 | 1 | 0 | 0 | 0 | 0 | 0 | 0 | 0 | 0 | 2 | 0 | 1 | 0 | 0 | 1 | 0 | 0 | 1 | 1 | 0 | 1 | 0 | 0 | 0 | 0 | 0 | 1 | 0 | 2 | 1 | 1 | 0 | 1 | 1 | 0 | 0 | 2 | 0 | 1 | 0 | 0 | 0 | 0 |
| Iowa | 0 | 1 | 0 | 0 | 0 | 0 | 0 | 1 | 0 | 0 | 0 | 0 | 0 | 0 | 1 | 0 | 1 | 0 | 0 | 1 | 0 | 0 | 0 | 1 | 1 | 0 | 0 | 0 | 1 | 0 | 0 | 0 | 0 | 1 | 0 | 0 | 1 | 0 | 0 | 0 | 0 | 0 | 0 | 0 | 0 | 0 | 1 | 0 | 0 | 1 | 0 | 0 | 0 | 2 | 0 | 0 | 0 | 1 | 1 | 0 | 0 | 0 | 1 | 0 | 0 | 0 | 1 | 0 | 0 | 0 | 0 | 0 | 0 | 0 | 0 | 0 | 0 | 0 | 0 | 1 | 1 | 0 | 0 | 0 | 0 |
| Kansas | 1 | 0 | 0 | 0 | 2 | 0 | 0 | 1 | 0 | 1 | 0 | 0 | 0 | 1 | 0 | 1 | 0 | 0 | 0 | 0 | 1 | 1 | 0 | 0 | 0 | 0 | 0 | 0 | 0 | 0 | 0 | 0 | 0 | 0 | 0 | 0 | 0 | 0 | 0 | 0 | 0 | 1 | 1 | 0 | 0 | 0 | 0 | 0 | 0 | 0 | 1 | 1 | 0 | 1 | 0 | 0 | 0 | 0 | 0 | 0 | 0 | 0 | 0 | 0 | 0 | 0 | 0 | 0 | 0 | 0 | 0 | 0 | 0 | 0 | 0 | 0 | 0 | 0 | 0 | 0 | 0 | 0 | 0 | 0 | 0 |
| Kentucky | 0 | 0 | 0 | 0 | 0 | 0 | 0 | 0 | 0 | 0 | 0 | 0 | 1 | 0 | 0 | 0 | 0 | 0 | 0 | 1 | 0 | 0 | 0 | 2 | 1 | 0 | 0 | 0 | 1 | 0 | 0 | 0 | 0 | 0 | 1 | 0 | 0 | 0 | 0 | 0 | 0 | 0 | 0 | 0 | 0 | 0 | 0 | 0 | 0 | 0 | 0 | 0 | 0 | 0 | 0 | 0 | 0 | 0 | 1 | 0 | 0 | 0 | 0 | 0 | 0 | 1 | 0 | 0 | 0 | 0 | 0 | 1 | 0 | 0 | 0 | 0 | 0 | 2 | 0 | 1 | 0 | 0 | 0 | 0 | 1 |
| Louisiana | 0 | 0 | 0 | 0 | 0 | 0 | 0 | 1 | 0 | 0 | 0 | 0 | 0 | 0 | 0 | 0 | 0 | 0 | 0 | 0 | 0 | 0 | 0 | 0 | 2 | 0 | 0 | 0 | 0 | 0 | 1 | 0 | 1 | 2 | 0 | 0 | 0 | 0 | 0 | 0 | 0 | 0 | 0 | 0 | 1 | 0 | 0 | 0 | 0 | 0 | 0 | 0 | 0 | 0 | 0 | 0 | 0 | 1 | 0 | 1 | 1 | 0 | 0 | 0 | 1 | 0 | 0 | 0 | 0 | 0 | 0 | 0 | 0 | 0 | 0 | 0 | 0 | 0 | 0 | 0 | 1 | 0 | 1 | 0 | 0 |
| Maine | 0 | 1 | 0 | 0 | 0 | 1 | 0 | 0 | 0 | 2 | 0 | 0 | 0 | 0 | 1 | 0 | 0 | 0 | 0 | 0 | 0 | 0 | 0 | 0 | 0 | 0 | 0 | 0 | 0 | 0 | 0 | 0 | 0 | 0 | 0 | 1 | 0 | 0 | 0 | 0 | 0 | 0 | 1 | 0 | 0 | 0 | 0 | 0 | 0 | 0 | 0 | 0 | 0 | 0 | 0 | 0 | 0 | 0 | 0 | 0 | 1 | 0 | 0 | 0 | 0 | 0 | 0 | 0 | 0 | 0 | 0 | 0 | 0 | 0 | 2 | 0 | 0 | 0 | 0 | 1 | 0 | 0 | 0 | 0 | 0 |
| Maryland | 0 | 0 | 0 | 0 | 0 | 0 | 0 | 0 | 0 | 1 | 0 | 0 | 2 | 0 | 1 | 0 | 2 | 2 | 0 | 2 | 0 | 1 | 4 | 1 | 2 | 1 | 1 | 1 | 1 | 0 | 0 | 1 | 0 | 1 | 2 | 1 | 2 | 3 | 2 | 1 | 1 | 1 | 2 | 0 | 0 | 2 | 0 | 2 | 4 | 1 | 5 | 5 | 0 | 1 | 2 | 0 | 4 | 6 | 3 | 2 | 4 | 1 | 4 | 4 | 4 | 3 | 2 | 0 | 1 | 0 | 1 | 1 | 4 | 2 | 3 | 3 | 5 | 3 | 1 | 2 | 0 | 0 | 1 | 0 | 2 |
| Massachusetts | 0 | 0 | 0 | 0 | 0 | 1 | 2 | 1 | 1 | 2 | 1 | 1 | 0 | 1 | 1 | 1 | 3 | 2 | 3 | 2 | 2 | 4 | 2 | 1 | 3 | 2 | 3 | 1 | 1 | 0 | 2 | 0 | 0 | 2 | 2 | 1 | 2 | 0 | 0 | 0 | 0 | 1 | 2 | 3 | 0 | 1 | 2 | 1 | 1 | 0 | 1 | 0 | 4 | 0 | 2 | 0 | 0 | 2 | 2 | 1 | 1 | 1 | 2 | 1 | 1 | 0 | 1 | 1 | 1 | 1 | 1 | 2 | 3 | 1 | 2 | 1 | 4 | 1 | 3 | 1 | 1 | 2 | 1 | 3 | 1 |
| Michigan | 0 | 0 | 1 | 1 | 0 | 0 | 1 | 0 | 0 | 0 | 0 | 0 | 0 | 0 | 1 | 1 | 1 | 0 | 0 | 0 | 0 | 0 | 0 | 0 | 0 | 1 | 3 | 0 | 0 | 0 | 0 | 0 | 0 | 1 | 1 | 0 | 1 | 1 | 2 | 0 | 1 | 2 | 1 | 2 | 3 | 3 | 1 | 1 | 0 | 1 | 0 | 0 | 1 | 3 | 1 | 0 | 1 | 0 | 0 | 0 | 0 | 1 | 1 | 1 | 1 | 3 | 1 | 0 | 1 | 1 | 3 | 1 | 0 | 0 | 1 | 1 | 0 | 1 | 1 | 1 | 1 | 2 | 0 | 0 | 1 |
| Minnesota | 1 | 0 | 0 | 0 | 1 | 1 | 0 | 0 | 0 | 1 | 0 | 1 | 2 | 0 | 2 | 0 | 0 | 0 | 2 | 0 | 0 | 0 | 0 | 1 | 2 | 1 | 0 | 0 | 0 | 0 | 0 | 0 | 2 | 0 | 0 | 1 | 0 | 0 | 0 | 0 | 0 | 1 | 0 | 0 | 0 | 0 | 0 | 1 | 0 | 0 | 0 | 3 | 2 | 1 | 0 | 1 | 1 | 0 | 0 | 1 | 1 | 1 | 1 | 1 | 0 | 0 | 0 | 2 | 0 | 1 | 1 | 0 | 0 | 0 | 0 | 0 | 0 | 0 | 0 | 0 | 1 | 0 | 0 | 0 | 0 |
| Mississippi | 0 | 0 | 0 | 0 | 0 | 0 | 0 | 0 | 0 | 0 | 0 | 0 | 1 | 2 | 0 | 0 | 0 | 0 | 0 | 0 | 0 | 0 | 0 | 0 | 0 | 0 | 0 | 0 | 0 | 0 | 0 | 0 | 0 | 0 | 0 | 0 | 0 | 1 | 0 | 0 | 0 | 0 | 1 | 0 | 0 | 0 | 0 | 0 | 0 | 0 | 0 | 2 | 0 | 1 | 0 | 2 | 0 | 0 | 0 | 0 | 0 | 0 | 0 | 0 | 0 | 0 | 0 | 0 | 0 | 0 | 0 | 0 | 0 | 0 | 0 | 0 | 1 | 0 | 0 | 0 | 0 | 0 | 0 | 0 | 0 |
| Missouri | 0 | 2 | 0 | 1 | 1 | 0 | 1 | 2 | 0 | 0 | 0 | 1 | 0 | 0 | 0 | 1 | 0 | 0 | 1 | 1 | 0 | 0 | 0 | 0 | 0 | 0 | 0 | 0 | 0 | 0 | 0 | 1 | 0 | 1 | 0 | 0 | 2 | 0 | 0 | 0 | 1 | 0 | 1 | 1 | 0 | 0 | 0 | 1 | 0 | 0 | 0 | 0 | 1 | 0 | 0 | 0 | 0 | 0 | 0 | 1 | 0 | 0 | 0 | 0 | 0 | 0 | 1 | 1 | 0 | 0 | 0 | 0 | 0 | 0 | 1 | 0 | 0 | 0 | 1 | 0 | 0 | 0 | 0 | 0 | 0 |
| Montana | 0 | 0 | 0 | 0 | 0 | 0 | 0 | 0 | 0 | 0 | 1 | 0 | 0 | 0 | 1 | 1 | 1 | 2 | 0 | 0 | 0 | 0 | 0 | 0 | 0 | 0 | 0 | 0 | 0 | 0 | 0 | 1 | 0 | 0 | 0 | 0 | 0 | 0 | 2 | 0 | 0 | 0 | 1 | 1 | 0 | 0 | 0 | 1 | 1 | 0 | 0 | 0 | 1 | 0 | 0 | 1 | 0 | 0 | 1 | 0 | 0 | 0 | 0 | 0 | 0 | 0 | 0 | 0 | 0 | 0 | 0 | 0 | 0 | 0 | 0 | 0 | 0 | 0 | 0 | 0 | 0 | 0 | 0 | 0 | 0 |
| Nebraska | 0 | 0 | 0 | 2 | 0 | 0 | 0 | 0 | 0 | 0 | 2 | 0 | 0 | 1 | 0 | 1 | 1 | 0 | 0 | 1 | 0 | 0 | 1 | 1 | 0 | 1 | 0 | 0 | 0 | 0 | 0 | 1 | 0 | 0 | 0 | 0 | 0 | 1 | 0 | 1 | 0 | 1 | 0 | 0 | 1 | 0 | 0 | 0 | 0 | 1 | 0 | 0 | 1 | 0 | 0 | 0 | 0 | 0 | 0 | 0 | 0 | 0 | 0 | 0 | 0 | 0 | 0 | 0 | 0 | 1 | 0 | 0 | 0 | 0 | 0 | 0 | 0 | 0 | 0 | 0 | 0 | 0 | 0 | 0 | 0 |
| Nevada | 0 | 0 | 0 | 0 | 0 | 0 | 0 | 0 | 0 | 0 | 0 | 0 | 0 | 0 | 0 | 0 | 0 | 0 | 0 | 0 | 0 | 0 | 1 | 0 | 0 | 0 | 1 | 0 | 0 | 0 | 0 | 0 | 0 | 0 | 0 | 0 | 0 | 0 | 0 | 0 | 0 | 0 | 0 | 0 | 0 | 0 | 0 | 0 | 0 | 0 | 0 | 0 | 0 | 0 | 0 | 0 | 0 | 0 | 0 | 0 | 0 | 0 | 0 | 0 | 0 | 0 | 0 | 0 | 0 | 0 | 0 | 0 | 0 | 0 | 0 | 0 | 0 | 0 | 1 | 0 | 0 | 0 | 1 | 0 | 0 |
| New Hampshire | 0 | 1 | 0 | 0 | 0 | 1 | 0 | 0 | 0 | 1 | 0 | 1 | 1 | 0 | 0 | 0 | 0 | 0 | 0 | 0 | 0 | 0 | 0 | 0 | 0 | 0 | 0 | 0 | 0 | 0 | 0 | 0 | 0 | 0 | 0 | 0 | 0 | 0 | 0 | 0 | 0 | 0 | 0 | 0 | 1 | 0 | 0 | 0 | 0 | 0 | 0 | 0 | 1 | 0 | 0 | 0 | 0 | 0 | 0 | 0 | 0 | 0 | 0 | 0 | 0 | 1 | 0 | 0 | 0 | 0 | 0 | 0 | 0 | 0 | 1 | 2 | 1 | 0 | 0 | 1 | 1 | 0 | 3 | 0 | 1 |
| New Jersey | 2 | 2 | 4 | 1 | 3 | 3 | 3 | 2 | 1 | 3 | 3 | 2 | 2 | 3 | 2 | 1 | 2 | 1 | 3 | 0 | 0 | 2 | 3 | 2 | 1 | 0 | 2 | 1 | 0 | 1 | 1 | 1 | 2 | 1 | 3 | 0 | 2 | 1 | 0 | 2 | 2 | 0 | 3 | 2 | 0 | 0 | 1 | 1 | 2 | 3 | 1 | 0 | 0 | 1 | 1 | 2 | 0 | 1 | 0 | 0 | 2 | 0 | 0 | 0 | 0 | 3 | 1 | 3 | 2 | 3 | 1 | 2 | 2 | 4 | 0 | 3 | 0 | 2 | 4 | 1 | 2 | 0 | 1 | 3 | 5 |
| New Mexico | 0 | 1 | 0 | 0 | 0 | 0 | 0 | 0 | 0 | 0 | 0 | 0 | 0 | 0 | 0 | 0 | 1 | 0 | 0 | 0 | 0 | 0 | 1 | 0 | 0 | 0 | 0 | 0 | 0 | 1 | 0 | 0 | 0 | 0 | 1 | 1 | 0 | 0 | 0 | 0 | 0 | 1 | 0 | 0 | 0 | 2 | 0 | 1 | 0 | 1 | 0 | 1 | 0 | 1 | 0 | 1 | 1 | 0 | 0 | 0 | 0 | 1 | 0 | 1 | 0 | 0 | 1 | 0 | 1 | 0 | 0 | 1 | 0 | 0 | 0 | 0 | 0 | 0 | 2 | 0 | 0 | 0 | 0 | 1 | 0 |
| New York | 17 | 9 | 14 | 15 | 11 | 14 | 14 | 13 | 23 | 14 | 18 | 15 | 13 | 10 | 8 | 11 | 9 | 9 | 8 | 11 | 14 | 10 | 12 | 10 | 9 | 7 | 6 | 9 | 14 | 11 | 11 | 12 | 9 | 10 | 13 | 14 | 14 | 15 | 14 | 17 | 15 | 19 | 17 | 12 | 15 | 15 | 16 | 19 | 19 | 14 | 20 | 7 | 14 | 15 | 15 | 18 | 15 | 12 | 17 | 13 | 15 | 20 | 18 | 13 | 13 | 12 | 15 | 9 | 11 | 7 | 10 | 7 | 7 | 8 | 8 | 8 | 5 | 9 | 8 | 6 | 10 | 8 | 9 | 8 | 5 |
| North Carolina | 0 | 0 | 0 | 0 | 0 | 0 | 0 | 0 | 0 | 0 | 0 | 0 | 0 | 0 | 0 | 0 | 0 | 0 | 1 | 0 | 0 | 0 | 0 | 0 | 0 | 0 | 0 | 0 | 0 | 1 | 0 | 0 | 0 | 0 | 0 | 0 | 0 | 1 | 0 | 0 | 0 | 0 | 0 | 0 | 0 | 0 | 0 | 1 | 0 | 1 | 0 | 2 | 0 | 2 | 0 | 0 | 0 | 0 | 2 | 0 | 0 | 1 | 0 | 0 | 0 | 1 | 1 | 0 | 1 | 2 | 0 | 0 | 2 | 1 | 0 | 1 | 0 | 1 | 0 | 0 | 1 | 4 | 0 | 3 | 1 |
| North Dakota | 1 | 0 | 0 | 0 | 0 | 0 | 0 | 0 | 0 | 0 | 0 | 0 | 0 | 0 | 0 | 0 | 0 | 0 | 0 | 0 | 0 | 0 | 0 | 0 | 0 | 0 | 0 | 0 | 0 | 0 | 0 | 1 | 0 | 0 | 0 | 0 | 0 | 0 | 0 | 0 | 0 | 0 | 0 | 0 | 0 | 0 | 0 | 0 | 0 | 0 | 0 | 0 | 0 | 0 | 0 | 0 | 0 | 0 | 0 | 0 | 0 | 0 | 0 | 0 | 0 | 1 | 0 | 0 | 1 | 0 | 0 | 0 | 0 | 0 | 0 | 0 | 0 | 0 | 0 | 0 | 0 | 0 | 0 | 0 | 0 |
| Ohio | 0 | 4 | 3 | 1 | 0 | 3 | 4 | 3 | 2 | 3 | 0 | 1 | 0 | 2 | 0 | 3 | 1 | 3 | 0 | 3 | 3 | 1 | 0 | 2 | 3 | 4 | 2 | 2 | 1 | 2 | 1 | 1 | 2 | 0 | 3 | 1 | 1 | 0 | 0 | 0 | 3 | 0 | 1 | 0 | 2 | 2 | 1 | 1 | 0 | 1 | 0 | 1 | 1 | 0 | 0 | 0 | 0 | 0 | 0 | 2 | 0 | 0 | 0 | 1 | 1 | 1 | 0 | 3 | 0 | 0 | 0 | 0 | 0 | 1 | 1 | 0 | 1 | 0 | 1 | 1 | 0 | 0 | 0 | 2 | 0 |
| Oklahoma | 0 | 2 | 0 | 0 | 1 | 0 | 0 | 1 | 0 | 0 | 0 | 1 | 1 | 0 | 1 | 1 | 0 | 0 | 1 | 0 | 0 | 1 | 0 | 0 | 1 | 0 | 0 | 1 | 1 | 0 | 0 | 0 | 2 | 1 | 1 | 1 | 0 | 1 | 0 | 0 | 1 | 0 | 0 | 0 | 0 | 0 | 1 | 0 | 0 | 0 | 0 | 0 | 0 | 0 | 0 | 0 | 2 | 0 | 0 | 0 | 0 | 1 | 0 | 0 | 0 | 1 | 0 | 1 | 1 | 0 | 0 | 0 | 0 | 0 | 0 | 1 | 0 | 2 | 1 | 0 | 0 | 0 | 0 | 0 | 0 |
| Oregon | 1 | 0 | 0 | 1 | 1 | 1 | 1 | 1 | 2 | 2 | 0 | 1 | 2 | 0 | 1 | 2 | 1 | 0 | 0 | 1 | 0 | 1 | 0 | 1 | 0 | 0 | 0 | 0 | 0 | 0 | 2 | 0 | 1 | 1 | 0 | 0 | 0 | 0 | 1 | 0 | 0 | 0 | 1 | 1 | 0 | 0 | 0 | 0 | 0 | 0 | 0 | 0 | 0 | 2 | 0 | 1 | 0 | 1 | 0 | 1 | 0 | 1 | 2 | 0 | 2 | 1 | 1 | 2 | 1 | 2 | 0 | 3 | 0 | 2 | 1 | 1 | 2 | 0 | 2 | 3 | 0 | 0 | 1 | 1 | 1 |
| Pennsylvania | 2 | 6 | 3 | 2 | 4 | 2 | 1 | 3 | 1 | 3 | 0 | 2 | 2 | 1 | 1 | 1 | 2 | 3 | 1 | 0 | 3 | 1 | 2 | 1 | 2 | 3 | 5 | 3 | 4 | 4 | 1 | 1 | 4 | 2 | 1 | 3 | 2 | 0 | 0 | 0 | 1 | 0 | 0 | 3 | 4 | 2 | 1 | 2 | 2 | 1 | 1 | 0 | 1 | 0 | 0 | 1 | 0 | 1 | 1 | 2 | 0 | 0 | 0 | 0 | 0 | 0 | 4 | 1 | 0 | 2 | 1 | 3 | 0 | 1 | 2 | 2 | 2 | 2 | 0 | 0 | 3 | 0 | 2 | 1 | 3 |
| Rhode Island | 0 | 0 | 0 | 1 | 0 | 0 | 0 | 0 | 1 | 0 | 0 | 0 | 0 | 0 | 0 | 0 | 0 | 1 | 0 | 0 | 0 | 0 | 0 | 0 | 0 | 0 | 0 | 0 | 0 | 0 | 1 | 1 | 1 | 0 | 0 | 0 | 1 | 0 | 0 | 0 | 0 | 0 | 0 | 0 | 0 | 1 | 0 | 0 | 0 | 0 | 0 | 0 | 0 | 0 | 1 | 0 | 0 | 0 | 0 | 0 | 0 | 0 | 0 | 0 | 0 | 1 | 0 | 0 | 0 | 0 | 0 | 0 | 0 | 0 | 0 | 0 | 0 | 0 | 0 | 0 | 0 | 0 | 0 | 1 | 0 |
| South Carolina | 0 | 0 | 0 | 0 | 0 | 0 | 0 | 0 | 0 | 0 | 0 | 0 | 0 | 0 | 0 | 0 | 0 | 1 | 0 | 0 | 0 | 0 | 0 | 0 | 0 | 0 | 0 | 0 | 0 | 1 | 1 | 1 | 0 | 0 | 0 | 1 | 0 | 1 | 0 | 0 | 0 | 0 | 0 | 0 | 0 | 0 | 0 | 0 | 0 | 0 | 0 | 0 | 0 | 0 | 1 | 0 | 0 | 0 | 0 | 0 | 0 | 0 | 0 | 0 | 0 | 0 | 1 | 0 | 0 | 0 | 0 | 0 | 0 | 0 | 0 | 0 | 0 | 0 | 2 | 0 | 0 | 0 | 0 | 0 | 0 |
| South Dakota | 0 | 0 | 0 | 0 | 0 | 0 | 1 | 0 | 1 | 0 | 0 | 1 | 0 | 0 | 0 | 0 | 0 | 0 | 0 | 0 | 0 | 0 | 1 | 0 | 0 | 0 | 0 | 0 | 0 | 0 | 0 | 0 | 0 | 0 | 0 | 0 | 0 | 0 | 0 | 0 | 0 | 0 | 0 | 0 | 0 | 0 | 0 | 0 | 0 | 0 | 0 | 0 | 1 | 0 | 0 | 0 | 0 | 0 | 0 | 0 | 0 | 0 | 0 | 0 | 0 | 0 | 0 | 0 | 0 | 0 | 0 | 0 | 1 | 0 | 0 | 0 | 0 | 0 | 0 | 0 | 0 | 0 | 0 | 0 | 0 |
| Tennessee | 0 | 0 | 0 | 1 | 0 | 1 | 0 | 1 | 1 | 1 | 0 | 0 | 0 | 1 | 0 | 0 | 0 | 1 | 0 | 0 | 0 | 0 | 0 | 1 | 0 | 1 | 1 | 0 | 0 | 0 | 1 | 0 | 1 | 0 | 1 | 0 | 0 | 1 | 1 | 0 | 0 | 1 | 0 | 0 | 0 | 1 | 0 | 0 | 0 | 0 | 0 | 0 | 0 | 0 | 0 | 0 | 0 | 0 | 0 | 0 | 0 | 0 | 0 | 0 | 0 | 0 | 0 | 0 | 0 | 0 | 0 | 2 | 1 | 0 | 1 | 0 | 0 | 1 | 0 | 0 | 0 | 1 | 0 | 1 | 0 |
| Texas | 0 | 0 | 0 | 0 | 0 | 0 | 0 | 1 | 0 | 0 | 0 | 1 | 1 | 0 | 0 | 1 | 0 | 1 | 1 | 2 | 1 | 1 | 1 | 2 | 0 | 3 | 1 | 4 | 2 | 1 | 3 | 1 | 3 | 0 | 0 | 1 | 1 | 2 | 1 | 3 | 1 | 2 | 0 | 0 | 0 | 0 | 1 | 0 | 1 | 1 | 0 | 2 | 1 | 2 | 2 | 1 | 1 | 0 | 2 | 2 | 2 | 1 | 1 | 2 | 0 | 2 | 3 | 2 | 3 | 3 | 3 | 1 | 3 | 1 | 1 | 3 | 2 | 1 | 1 | 5 | 2 | 2 | 1 | 2 | 6 |
| Utah | 0 | 0 | 0 | 0 | 0 | 0 | 0 | 1 | 0 | 0 | 0 | 0 | 0 | 0 | 0 | 0 | 0 | 0 | 0 | 0 | 0 | 0 | 0 | 0 | 0 | 0 | 0 | 0 | 0 | 0 | 0 | 1 | 0 | 0 | 0 | 0 | 0 | 0 | 0 | 0 | 0 | 0 | 0 | 0 | 0 | 0 | 1 | 0 | 0 | 0 | 0 | 0 | 2 | 0 | 0 | 0 | 0 | 0 | 0 | 0 | 0 | 0 | 0 | 0 | 1 | 0 | 0 | 0 | 0 | 0 | 0 | 0 | 0 | 1 | 0 | 0 | 0 | 0 | 0 | 0 | 0 | 0 | 0 | 0 | 0 |
| Vermont | 0 | 0 | 0 | 0 | 0 | 0 | 0 | 0 | 0 | 0 | 0 | 0 | 0 | 0 | 0 | 0 | 0 | 0 | 0 | 0 | 0 | 0 | 0 | 0 | 0 | 0 | 0 | 0 | 1 | 0 | 0 | 0 | 0 | 0 | 0 | 0 | 0 | 0 | 0 | 0 | 0 | 0 | 0 | 0 | 0 | 0 | 0 | 0 | 0 | 0 | 0 | 0 | 0 | 0 | 0 | 0 | 0 | 0 | 0 | 0 | 0 | 0 | 1 | 0 | 0 | 0 | 0 | 0 | 0 | 0 | 0 | 0 | 0 | 0 | 0 | 0 | 0 | 0 | 0 | 0 | 0 | 0 | 0 | 0 | 0 |
| Virginia | 0 | 1 | 0 | 1 | 0 | 0 | 0 | 0 | 0 | 0 | 1 | 1 | 0 | 0 | 2 | 0 | 1 | 1 | 1 | 1 | 0 | 1 | 4 | 1 | 2 | 3 | 2 | 3 | 0 | 3 | 0 | 1 | 2 | 1 | 2 | 3 | 1 | 2 | 2 | 2 | 0 | 1 | 0 | 4 | 2 | 1 | 3 | 1 | 2 | 4 | 2 | 4 | 2 | 1 | 4 | 3 | 3 | 2 | 0 | 2 | 0 | 0 | 2 | 0 | 1 | 1 | 1 | 2 | 1 | 0 | 1 | 1 | 0 | 1 | 1 | 1 | 4 | 3 | 2 | 3 | 2 | 3 | 2 | 3 | 1 |
| Washington | 0 | 0 | 0 | 0 | 2 | 0 | 0 | 0 | 1 | 0 | 0 | 0 | 1 | 0 | 1 | 0 | 0 | 0 | 0 | 0 | 1 | 2 | 0 | 0 | 0 | 0 | 0 | 1 | 0 | 0 | 0 | 0 | 0 | 1 | 0 | 1 | 0 | 0 | 0 | 1 | 0 | 0 | 0 | 0 | 0 | 0 | 0 | 1 | 1 | 0 | 0 | 1 | 0 | 1 | 0 | 1 | 0 | 1 | 1 | 0 | 0 | 0 | 0 | 1 | 1 | 0 | 1 | 0 | 1 | 0 | 1 | 0 | 0 | 1 | 0 | 1 | 0 | 1 | 0 | 1 | 1 | 1 | 1 | 2 | 0 |
| West Virginia | 2 | 1 | 1 | 0 | 1 | 1 | 0 | 0 | 0 | 1 | 0 | 0 | 1 | 2 | 0 | 1 | 0 | 0 | 1 | 0 | 0 | 0 | 0 | 0 | 1 | 0 | 0 | 0 | 0 | 0 | 0 | 0 | 0 | 0 | 1 | 0 | 0 | 1 | 0 | 1 | 0 | 0 | 0 | 0 | 0 | 0 | 0 | 0 | 0 | 0 | 0 | 1 | 0 | 0 | 2 | 0 | 0 | 0 | 0 | 0 | 0 | 0 | 0 | 0 | 0 | 1 | 0 | 0 | 0 | 0 | 0 | 1 | 0 | 0 | 0 | 0 | 0 | 0 | 0 | 0 | 0 | 0 | 0 | 0 | 0 |
| Wisconsin | 3 | 2 | 4 | 5 | 0 | 1 | 2 | 1 | 0 | 0 | 0 | 1 | 0 | 2 | 2 | 1 | 1 | 2 | 1 | 0 | 1 | 0 | 0 | 2 | 0 | 0 | 0 | 0 | 0 | 2 | 0 | 1 | 1 | 1 | 0 | 1 | 0 | 0 | 1 | 1 | 1 | 1 | 1 | 1 | 0 | 0 | 1 | 0 | 0 | 0 | 1 | 1 | 1 | 0 | 0 | 1 | 0 | 0 | 0 | 0 | 1 | 0 | 0 | 1 | 1 | 0 | 1 | 3 | 1 | 0 | 0 | 0 | 0 | 1 | 0 | 0 | 0 | 1 | 2 | 0 | 0 | 0 | 0 | 0 | 0 |
| Wyoming | 0 | 0 | 1 | 0 | 0 | 0 | 0 | 0 | 0 | 0 | 0 | 0 | 0 | 0 | 0 | 0 | 1 | 0 | 1 | 0 | 0 | 0 | 0 | 0 | 0 | 0 | 0 | 0 | 0 | 0 | 0 | 0 | 2 | 0 | 0 | 0 | 0 | 0 | 0 | 0 | 0 | 0 | 0 | 0 | 0 | 0 | 0 | 0 | 0 | 0 | 0 | 0 | 0 | 0 | 0 | 0 | 0 | 0 | 0 | 1 | 0 | 0 | 0 | 0 | 0 | 0 | 0 | 0 | 0 | 0 | 0 | 0 | 0 | 0 | 0 | 0 | 0 | 0 | 0 | 0 | 0 | 0 | 0 | 0 | 0 |
| Puerto Rico | 0 | 0 | 0 | 0 | 0 | 0 | 0 | 0 | 0 | 0 | 0 | 0 | 0 | 0 | 0 | 0 | 0 | 0 | 0 | 0 | 0 | 0 | 0 | 0 | 0 | 0 | 0 | 0 | 0 | 0 | 0 | 0 | 0 | 0 | 0 | 0 | 0 | 0 | 0 | 0 | 0 | 1 | 0 | 1 | 0 | 0 | 0 | 0 | 0 | 0 | 0 | 0 | 0 | 0 | 0 | 0 | 0 | 1 | 0 | 0 | 0 | 0 | 0 | 0 | 0 | 0 | 0 | 0 | 0 | 0 | 0 | 0 | 0 | 0 | 0 | 0 | 0 | 0 | 0 | 0 | 0 | 0 | 0 | 0 | 0 |
| Guam | 0 | 0 | 0 | 0 | 0 | 0 | 0 | 0 | 0 | 0 | 0 | 0 | 0 | 0 | 0 | 0 | 0 | 0 | 0 | 0 | 0 | 0 | 0 | 0 | 0 | 0 | 0 | 0 | 0 | 0 | 0 | 0 | 0 | 0 | 0 | 0 | 0 | 0 | 0 | 0 | 0 | 0 | 0 | 0 | 0 | 0 | 0 | 0 | 0 | 0 | 0 | 0 | 0 | 0 | 0 | 0 | 0 | 0 | 0 | 0 | 1 | 0 | 0 | 0 | 0 | 0 | 0 | 0 | 0 | 0 | 0 | 0 | 0 | 0 | 0 | 0 | 0 | 0 | 0 | 0 | 0 | 0 | 0 | 0 | 0 |

Certain high schools have been particularly successful at placing semifinalists and finalists in the Science Talent Search. From the early years of the competition, two specialized high schools in New York City dominated the competition: Bronx High School of Science and Stuyvesant High School. Other New York schools have also had notable success in the competition, including Ward Melville High School in East Setauket, Byram Hills High School in Armonk, Jericho High School in Jericho, and Paul D. Schreiber Senior High School in Port Washington. In the 1980s and 1990s, other specialized STEM schools, including Virginia's Thomas Jefferson High School for Science and Technology and Maryland's Montgomery Blair High School, began to produce large numbers of finalists to rival the New York schools. In the 21st century, a new group of specialized STEM schools have had growing success in the competition, including New Jersey's Bergen County Academies, and the private Harker School in California.

== List of winners ==
=== 1942–1948 ===
First-place winners from 1942 to 1948
| Year | Top boy | | Top girl | | Ref. |
| Year | Name | Home city | Name | Home city | Ref. |
|---|---|---|---|---|---|
| 1942 | Paul Teschan | Shorewood, Wisconsin | Marina Meyers | Farmingdale, New York | |
| 1943 | Reinhart Schiff | New Rochelle, New York | Gloria Lauer | Ames, Iowa | |
| 1944 | Amber Davidson | Fort Bridger, Wyoming | Anne Van Buren | New York City | |
| 1945 | Edward Kosower | Brooklyn | Marion Joswick | Brooklyn | |
| 1946 | Jules Kernen | St. Louis | E. Marilyn Curran | Elizabethtown, Pennsylvania | |
| 1947 | Martin Karplus | West Newton, Massachusetts | Vera Dyson-Hudson | Cold Spring Harbor, New York | |
| 1948 | Andrew Kende | Evanston, Illinois | Barbara Searle | Flushing, Queens | |

=== 1949–present ===
First-place winners from 1949–present
| Year | 1st place | Home city or high school | Ref. |
|---|---|---|---|
| 1949 | Dwight Taylor | Altadena, California | |
| 1950 | Saul Sternberg | The Bronx | |
| 1951 | Robert J. Kolenkow | Niagara Falls, New York | |
| 1952 | Karl Muench | Evanston, Illinois | |
| 1953 | Edward Phillips | Lincoln, Massachusetts | |
| 1954 | Alan Haught | Bethesda, Maryland | |
| 1955 | Frederick Greenleaf | Allentown, Pennsylvania | |
| 1956 | Robert Moore | Silver Spring, Maryland | |
| 1957 | Brett Nordgren | South Bend, Indiana | |
| 1958 | Reinier Beeuwkes III | Newton, Massachusetts | |
| 1959 | John Letcher | Lexington, Virginia | |
| 1960 | Jerome Spitzner | St. James, Minnesota | |
| 1961 | Joshua Wallman | New York City | |
| 1962 | Christopher Cherniak | Eau Gallie, Florida | |
| 1963 | Sylvain Cappell | New York City | |
| 1964 | Robert Sproull | Alexandria, Virginia | |
| 1965 | Larry Howard | Canoga Park, Los Angeles | |
| 1966 | Henry Wagner Jr. | Gwynedd Valley, Pennsylvania | |
| 1967 | Nevin Summers Jr. | Jacksonville, Florida | |
| 1968 | Roger Y. Tsien | Livingston High School | |
| 1969 | Lane P. Hughston | Dallas | |
| 1970 | Kirk Shinsky | Allentown, Pennsylvania | |
| 1971 | James Van Aken | Western Springs, Illinois | |
| 1972 | Nina F. Schor | Douglaston–Little Neck, Queens | |
| 1973 | Arvind Srivastava | Fort Collins, Colorado | |
| 1974 | Eric Lander | Stuyvesant High School | |
| 1975 | Paul Zeitz | Stuyvesant High School | |
| 1976 | Edward Phinney III | Leverett, Massachusetts | |
| 1977 | Richard Schirato | Dallas | |
| 1978 | Michael Briggs | Adelphi, Maryland | |
| 1979 | Ron Unz | North Hollywood High School | |
| 1980 | Lisa Randall | Stuyvesant High School | |
| 1981 | Amy Reichel | New York City | |
| 1982 | Reena Gordon | Brooklyn | |
| 1983 | Paul Ning | New York City | |
| 1984 | Christopher Montanaro | South Paris, Maine | |
| 1985 | Alan Hu | La Jolla | |
| 1986 | Wendy Chung | Miami Killian Senior High School | |
| 1987 | Louise Chang | Westmont, Illinois | |
| 1988 | Chetan Nayak | New York City | |
| 1989 | Christopher Skinner | Little Rock, Arkansas | |
| 1990 | Matthew Headrick | University of Chicago Laboratory Schools | |
| 1991 | Ashley Reiter | Charlotte, North Carolina | |
| 1992 | Kurt Thorn | Wading River, New York | |
| 1993 | Elizabeth Pine | Chicago | |
| 1994 | Forrest Anderson | Helena, Montana | |
| 1995 | Irene Chen | San Diego | |
| 1996 | Jacob Lurie | Montgomery Blair High School | |
| 1997 | Adam Cohen | New York City | |
| 1998 | Christopher Mihelich | Carmel, Indiana | |
| 1999 | Natalia Toro | Boulder, Colorado | |
| 2000 | Viviana Risca | Port Washington, New York | |
| 2001 | Mariangela Lisanti | Westport, Connecticut | |
| 2002 | Ryan Patterson | Grand Junction, Colorado | |
| 2003 | Jamie Rubin | Fort Myers, Florida | |
| 2004 | Herbert Mason Hedberg | North Attleborough, Massachusetts | |
| 2005 | David Bauer | The Bronx | |
| 2006 | Shannon Babb | Highland, Utah | |
| 2007 | Mary Masterman | Oklahoma City | |
| 2008 | Shivani Sud | Durham, North Carolina | |
| 2009 | Eric Larson | Eugene, Oregon | |
| 2010 | Erika DeBenedictis | Albuquerque, New Mexico | |
| 2011 | Evan O'Dorney | Danville, California | |
| 2012 | Nithin Tumma | Fort Gratiot Township, Michigan | |
| 2013 | Sarah Volz | Colorado Springs, Colorado | |
| 2014 | Eric Chen | San Diego | |
| 2015 | Noah Golowich | Lexington, Massachusetts | |
| 2015 | Andrew Jin | San Jose, California | |
| 2015 | Michael Hofmann Winer | Silver Spring, Maryland | |
| 2016 | Amol Punjabi | Worcester, Massachusetts | |
| 2016 | Paige Brown | Bangor, Maine | |
| 2016 | Maya Varma | San Jose, California | |
| 2017 | Indrani Das | Oradell, New Jersey | |
| 2018 | Benjamin Firester | New York City | |
| 2019 | Ana Humphrey | Alexandria, Virginia | |
| 2020 | Lillian Petersen | Los Alamos, New Mexico | |
| 2021 | Yunseo Choi | Exeter, New Hampshire | |
| 2022 | Christine Ye | Sammamish, Washington | |
| 2023 | Neel Moudgal | Saline, Michigan | |
| 2024 | Achyuta Rajaram | Exeter, New Hampshire | |
| 2025 | Matteo Paz | Pasadena High School | |
| 2026 | Connor Hill | Port Matilda, Pennsylvania | |

=== Other past winners ===
Notable finalists, semifinalists, and other top participants
| Name | Year | Placed | High school | Notability |
|---|---|---|---|---|
| Evelyne Pease Tyner | 1942 | Finalist | | Environmentalist who conserved large areas of native prairie with an ecology centre named after her, awarded the LEED award. |
| Robert Kraichnan | 1944 | 2nd boy | | National Academy of Sciences |
| Ben Mottelson | 1944 | Finalist | Lyons Township High School | 1975 Nobel Prize in Physics |
| Andrew Sessler | 1945 | Finalist | Forest Hills High School | National Academy of Sciences |
| Gerald Edelman | 1946 | Honorable mention | John Adams High School | 1972 Nobel Prize in Physiology or Medicine |
| Leon Cooper | 1947 | Finalist | Bronx High School of Science | 1972 Nobel Prize in Physics |
| Ronald Breslow | 1948 | Finalist | | 1991 National Medal of Science |
| R. Stephen Berry | 1948 | Finalist | East High School | 1983 MacArthur Fellowship, National Academy of Sciences |
| Fred Brooks | 1949 | Honorable mention | Greenville High School | 1985 National Medal of Technology and Innovation |
| Walter Gilbert | 1949 | Finalist | Sidwell Friends School | 1980 Nobel Prize in Chemistry |
| Paul Cohen | 1950 | Finalist | Stuyvesant High School | 1966 Fields Medal; 1967 National Medal of Science |
| Sheldon Glashow | 1950 | Finalist | Bronx High School of Science | 1979 Nobel Prize in Physics |
| Dana Scott | 1950 | Honorable Mention | C. K. McClatchy High School | 1976 Turing Award |
| John L. Hall | 1952 | Honorable Mention | South High School | 2005 Nobel Prize in Physics |
| David Mumford | 1953 | Finalist | Phillips Exeter Academy | 1974 Fields Medal |
| Joanna Russ | 1953 | Top 10 | William Howard Taft High School | Hugo and Nebula Awards, author of The Female Man |
| Alar Toomre | 1953 | Honorable mention | Sewanhaka High School | 1984 MacArthur Fellowship |
| Marcian Hoff | 1954 | Top 10 | Churchville-Chili Senior High School | 2009 National Medal of Technology and Innovation |
| Roald Hoffmann | 1955 | Finalist | Stuyvesant High School | 1981 Nobel Prize in Chemistry |
| Mary-Dell Chilton | 1956 | Finalist | Hinsdale Township High School | 2023 National Medal of Technology and Innovation |
| Leroy Hood | 1956 | Finalist | Shelby High School | 2011 National Medal of Science |
| Donald Knuth | 1956 | Honorable mention | Milwaukee Lutheran High School | 1974 Turing Award, 1979 National Medal of Science |
| Jane S. Richardson | 1958 | 3rd place | Teaneck High School | 1985 MacArthur Fellowship, National Academy of Sciences, National Academy of Medicine |
| John Henry Schwarz | 1958 | Honorable mention | North Shore High School | 1987 MacArthur Fellowship; 2014 Breakthrough Prize in Fundamental Physics |
| Kip Thorne | 1958 | Honorable mention | Logan High School | 2017 Nobel Prize in Physics |
| Charles H. Bennett | 1960 | 4th place | Croton-Harmon High School | 2023 Breakthrough Prize in Fundamental Physics |
| Robert Axelrod | 1961 | Finalist | Evanston Township High School | 2012 National Medal of Science |
| Whitfield Diffie | 1961 | Honors | Jamaica High School | 2015 Turing Award |
| Gary A. Wegner | 1963 | Honors | Bothell High School | Humboldt Prize |
| Paul L. Modrich | 1964 | Honors | Raton High School | 2015 Nobel Prize in Chemistry |
| Ray Kurzweil | 1965 | Finalist | Martin Van Buren High School | 1999 National Medal of Technology and Innovation |
| Frank Wilczek | 1967 | Finalist | Martin Van Buren High School | 2004 Nobel Prize in Physics |
| Alvin Roth | 1968 | Honors | Martin Van Buren High School | 2012 Nobel Prize in Economics |
| Gordon J. Freeman | 1969 | Finalist | Arlington Heights High School | National Academy of Sciences |
| Thomas Felix Rosenbaum | 1973 | Finalist | Forest Hills High School | President, California Institute of Technology |
| F. Thomson Leighton | 1974 | 2nd place | Stuyvesant High School | National Academy of Sciences, Akamai Technologies co-founder and CEO |
| Ronald Vale | 1976 | Finalist | Hollywood High School | National Academy of Sciences, National Academy of Medicine |
| George Yancopoulos | 1976 | Top 10 | Bronx High School of Science | National Academy of Sciences, Regeneron Pharmaceuticals co-founder and CSO |
| Richard H. Ebright | 1977 | Finalist | Muhlenberg High School | American Academy of Arts and Sciences |
| David Spergel | 1978 | Honors | John Glenn High School | 2001 MacArthur Fellow; 2018 Breakthrough Prize in Fundamental Physics |
| Brian Greene | 1980 | Finalist | Stuyvesant High School | The Elegant Universe author |
| Noam Elkies | 1982 | Finalist | Stuyvesant High School | 2004 Levi L. Conant Prize |
| Lisa Su | 1986 | Honors | Bronx High School of Science | IEEE Robert N. Noyce Medal; CEO of AMD |
| Jordan Ellenberg | 1989 | 2nd place | Winston Churchill High School | American Mathematical Society Fellow |
| David R. Liu | 1990 | 2nd place | Riverside Poly High School | National Academy of Sciences |
| Maneesh Agrawala | 1990 | Finalist | Montgomery Blair High School | 2009 MacArthur Fellowship |
| Christopher Bouton | 1992 | Finalist | Saint Ann's School (Brooklyn) | Entagen founder and CEO |
| Wei-Hwa Huang | 1993 | 6th place | Montgomery Blair High School | World Puzzle Champion 1995, 1997–1999 |
| Robert Sarvis | 1994 | 4th place | Thomas Jefferson High School for Science and Technology | Libertarian politician |
| Daniel Biss | 1995 | Finalist | Bloomington North High School | Mayor of Evanston, Illinois |
| Bill Thies | 1997 | Finalist | State College Area High School | 2016 MacArthur Fellowship |
| Parker Conrad | 1998 | 3rd place | The Collegiate School | Entrepreneur; founder and CEO of Rippling |
| Natalie Portman | 1998 | Semifinalist | Syosset High School | Actress |
| Keith Winstein | 1999 | 4th place | Illinois Mathematics and Science Academy | 2014 SIGCOMM Doctoral Dissertation Award |
| Feng Zhang | 2000 | 3rd place | Theodore Roosevelt High School | National Academy of Sciences |
| Monika Schleier-Smith | 2001 | Semifinalist | Thomas Jefferson High School for Science and Technology | 2020 MacArthur Fellow |
| Tianhui Michael Li | 2003 | 2nd place | Oregon Episcopal School | Marshall Scholar, Hertz Foundation Fellow, data scientist, founder and CEO of The Data Incubator |
| Lester Mackey | 2003 | 6th place | Half Hollow Hills High School West | 2023 MacArthur Fellowship |

== See also ==
- Broadcom MASTERS
- International Science and Engineering Fair
