= Adam Cohen =

Adam Cohen may refer to:

- Adam Cohen (journalist) (born c.1962), American journalist at The New York Times
- Adam Cohen (musician) (born 1972), Canadian born musician, the son of Leonard Cohen
- Adam Cohen (scientist) (born 1979), associate professor of chemistry and chemical biology and of physics at Harvard University
