= Siddhartha Mukherjee =

Indian-American physician, writer b. 1970

- সিদ্ধার্থ মুখার্জী
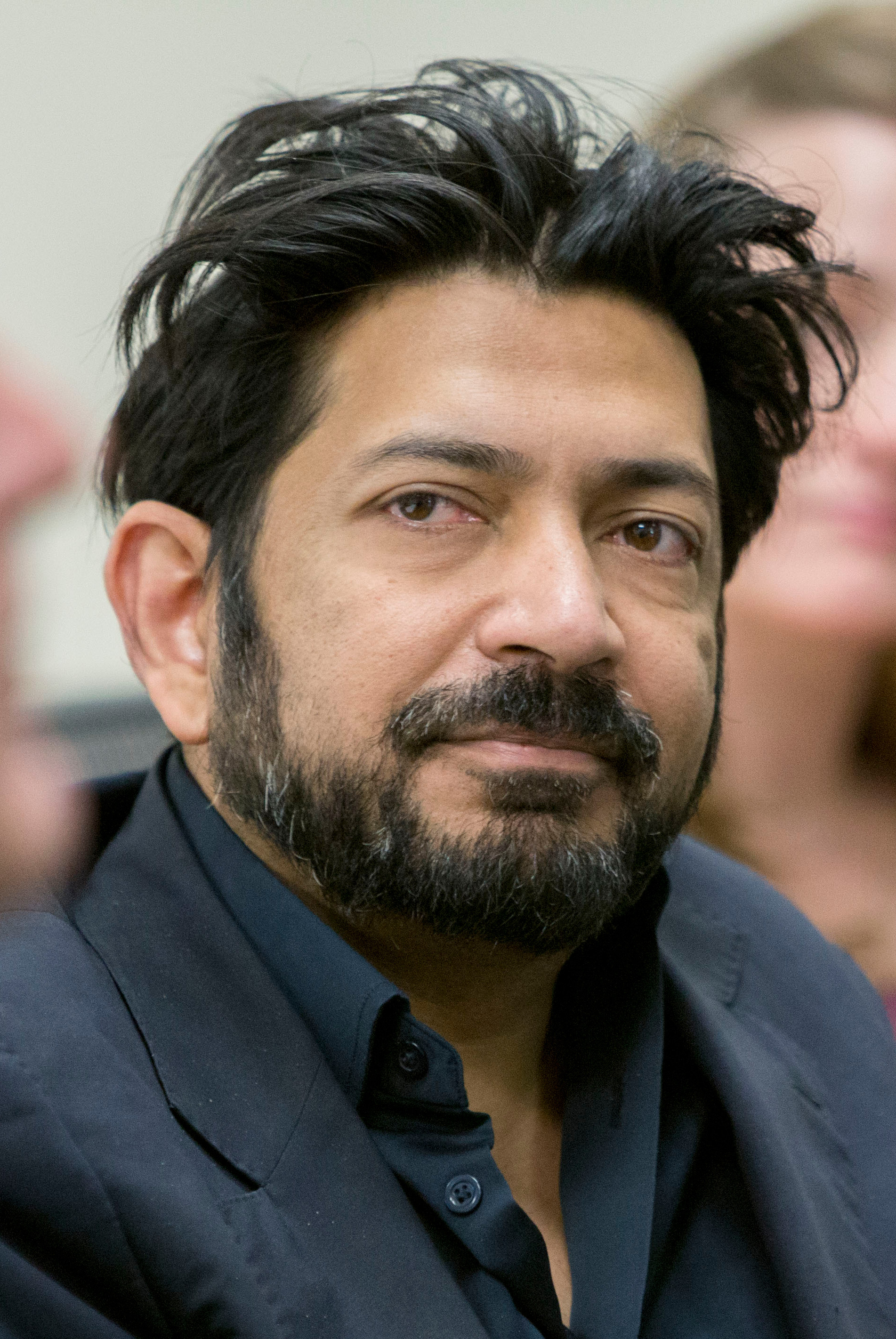
- Mukherjee in 2017
- Born: 21 July 1970 (age 56); New Delhi, India
- Education: Stanford University (BS); Magdalen College, Oxford (DPhil); Harvard University (MD)
- Known for: The Emperor of All Maladies: A Biography of Cancer; The Gene: An Intimate History; Cancer research
- Spouse: Sarah Sze (m. 2004; div. 2025)
- Children: 2
- Awards: Rhodes Scholarship; Pulitzer Prize for General Nonfiction (2011); Guardian First Book Award (2011); Padma Shri (2014)
- Scientific career
- Fields: Immunology; Cancer epidemiology Genetic epidemiology
- Workplaces: Columbia University
- Thesis: The Processing and Presentation of Viral Antigens (1997)
- Website: siddharthamukherjee.com

Siddhartha Mukherjee (Bengali: সিদ্ধার্থ মুখার্জী; born 21 July 1970) is an Indian physician, biologist, and author. His first book, The Emperor of All Maladies: A Biography of Cancer (2010), won the 2011 Pulitzer Prize for General Nonfiction, and Guardian First Book Award, among other awards. It was listed in the "All-Time 100 Nonfiction Books" (the 100 most influential books of the last century) by Time magazine in 2011. He followed it with The Gene: An Intimate History (2016), which was among The New York Times 100 best books of 2016, and a finalist for the Wellcome Trust Prize and the Royal Society Prize for Science Books. He won the 2019 Lewis Thomas Prize.

After completing secondary school education in India, Mukherjee studied biology at Stanford University, obtained a D.Phil. from University of Oxford as a Rhodes Scholar, and an M.D. from Harvard University. He joined New York–Presbyterian Hospital / Columbia University Medical Center in New York City in 2009. As of 2018, he is an associate professor of medicine in the Division of Hematology and Oncology.

Featured in the Time 100 list of most influential people in 2011, Mukherjee writes for The New Yorker and is a columnist in The New York Times. He is described as part of a select group of doctor-writers (such as Oliver Sacks and Atul Gawande) who have "transformed the public discourse on human health," and allowed a generation of readers a rare and intimate glimpse into the life of science and medicine. His research concerns the physiology of cancer cells, immunological therapy for blood cancers, and the discovery of bone- and cartilage-forming stem cells in the vertebrate skeleton.

The government of India conferred on him its fourth highest civilian award, the Padma Shri, in 2014.

== Early life and education ==
Siddhartha Mukherjee was born to a Bengali Brahmin family in New Delhi, India. His father, Sibeswar Mukherjee, was an executive with Mitsubishi, and his mother Chandana Mukherjee, was a former school teacher from Calcutta (now Kolkata). He attended St. Columba's School in Delhi, where he won the school's highest award, the 'Sword of Honour', in 1989. As a biology major at Stanford University, he worked in Nobel Laureate Paul Berg's laboratory, defining cellular genes that change the behaviours of cancer cells. He earned membership in Phi Beta Kappa in 1992, and completed his bachelor of science (BS) degree in 1993.

Mukherjee won a Rhodes Scholarship for doctoral research at Magdalen College, University of Oxford. He worked on the mechanism of activation of the immune system by viral antigens. He was awarded a DPhil in 1997 for his thesis titled The Processing and Presentation of Viral Antigens. After graduation, he attended Harvard Medical School, where he earned his doctor of medicine (MD) degree in 2000. Between 2000 and 2003 he worked as a resident in internal medicine at the Massachusetts General Hospital. From 2003 to 2006 he trained in hematology-oncology as a fellow at the Dana–Farber Cancer Institute (under Harvard Medical School) in Boston, Massachusetts.

== Career ==
In 2009, Mukherjee joined the faculty of the Department of Medicine in the Division of Hematology/Oncology at the Columbia University Medical Center as an assistant professor. The medical center is attached to the NewYork-Presbyterian Hospital in New York City.

He was previously affiliated with the Harvard Stem Cell Institute and with Massachusetts General Hospital in Boston. He has worked as the Plummer Visiting professor at the Mayo Clinic in Rochester, Minnesota, the Joseph Garland lecturer at the Massachusetts Medical Society, and an honorary visiting professor at Johns Hopkins School of Medicine. His laboratory is based at Columbia University's Herbert Irving Comprehensive Cancer Center.

In January 2025, Mukherjee launched Manas AI, an AI-enabled drug discovery startup, together with Reid Hoffman, with about $25 million in venture capital funding.

== Contributions ==
=== Cancer research ===
Mukherjee is a trained hematologist and oncologist whose research focuses on the links between normal stem cells and cancer cells. Through his findings, he had shown the roles of cells in cancer therapy. He has been investigating the microenvironment ("niche") of stem cells, particularly on blood-forming (haematopoietic) stem cells. Blood-forming stem cells are present in the bone marrow in very specific microenvironments. Osteoblasts, cells that form bone, are one of the principal components in this environment. These cells regulate the process of blood cell formation and development by providing them with signals to divide, remain quiescent, or maintain their stem cell properties. Distortion in the development of these cells results in severe blood cancers, such as myelodysplastic syndrome and leukemia. Mukherjee's research has been recognised through many grants from the National Institutes of Health and from private foundations.

Mukherjee and his co-workers have identified several genes and chemicals that can alter the microenvironment, or niche, and thereby alter the behavior of normal stem cells, as well as cancer cells. Two such chemicals—proteasome inhibitors and activin inhibitors—are under clinical trials. Mukherjee's lab has also identified novel genetic mutations in myelodysplasia and acute myelogenous leukaemia and has played a leading role in finding therapies for these diseases.

=== Bone formation ===
Mukherjee's team is also known for defining and characterizing skeletal stem/progenitor cells (also called osteochondroreticular or OCR cells). In 2015, they prospectively identified these progenitor cells from bone, and showed, using lineage tracing, that these cells can give rise to bone, cartilage, and reticular cells (hence the term "OCR" cells). They established that these cells form a part of the adult skeleton in vertebrates, and that they maintain and repair the skeleton.

OCR cells are among the newest progenitor cells to be defined in vertebrates. The work generated wide interest and was described in journals as a major breakthrough for understanding biology and for understanding diseases such as osteoporosis and osteoarthritis. Mukherjee's team have shown that OCR cells can be transplanted into animals, and they can regenerate cartilage and bone after fractures. With Daniel L. Worthley's team at the University of Adelaide and South Australian Health and Medical Research Institute they have been working on the translational cell-based research on osteoarthritis and cancer.

=== Metabolic therapies for cancer ===
Mukherjee's lab has also been investigating the interaction between cancer genetics and the microenvironment, including the metabolic environment. It has been well established that metabolism in cancer is fundamentally altered, Mukherjee's team has found the role of a high-fat, adequate-protein, low-carbohydrate diet (ketogenic diet) in cancer therapy. They showed that ketogenic diet suppressed insulin production in the body, and this in turn enhances pharmaceutical inhibition of PIK3CA, a gene which is mutated and commonly overactive in cancers.

=== Immune therapies for acute leukemia ===
Mukherjee's lab, with the help of PureTech Health plc, has been investigating chimeric antigen receptor redirected T cells (CAR-T) therapy in a joint venture called Vor BioPharma since 2016. They have combined CAR-T therapies with genetically modified hematopoietic stem cells to specifically target malignant hematopoietic lineages, while transplanted stem cells replenish the lineage but remain antigenically concealed. This technology has been developed so that, in addition to B cell malignancies, other lineage specific cancers could be targeted. This provides an important new approach to managing acute myeloid leukemia.

== Books ==
In 2010, Simon & Schuster published his book The Emperor of All Maladies: A Biography of Cancer detailing the evolution of diagnosis and treatment of human cancers from ancient Egypt to the latest developments in chemotherapy and targeted therapy. On 18 April 2011, the book won the annual Pulitzer Prize for General Nonfiction; the citation called it "an elegant inquiry, at once clinical and personal, into the long history of an insidious disease that, despite treatment breakthroughs, still bedevils medical science." It was listed in the "All-Time 100 Nonfiction Books" (the 100 most influential books of the last century) and the "Top 10 Nonfiction Books of 2010" by Time in 2011. It was also listed in "The 10 Best Books of 2010" by The New York Times and "Top 10 Books of 2010" by O, The Oprah Magazine. In 2011, it was nominated as a National Book Critics Circle Award finalist.

Based on the book, Ken Burns made the PBS documentary Cancer: The Emperor of All Maladies (2015). which was nominated for an Emmy Award.

He followed it with The Gene: An Intimate History (2016). It is a history of genetics from Gregor Mendel to Jennifer Doudna. It also delves into the personal genetic history of Mukherjee's family, including mental illness. The book discusses the power of genetics in determining people's health and attributes, but it also has a cautionary tone to not let genetic predispositions define fate, a mentality that led to the rise of eugenics in history and something he thinks lacks the nuance required to understand something as complex as human beings. Harriet Hall describes Emperor and The Gene as "the story of science itself". The Gene was shortlisted for the Royal Society Insight Investment Science Book Prize 2016, "the Nobel Prize of science writing." The book was also the recipient of the 2017 Phi Beta Kappa Society Book Award in Science.

Burns made a two-part PBS documentary, The Gene: An Intimate History in 2020.

In his book The Song of the Cell, published in 2022, Mukherjee describes the history and medical mystery from the discovery of cell. Narrated in metaphors, many of which he created, such as "gunslinging sheriff" for antibody and "gumshoe detective" to T cell, he tells the development of cell biology and how it became vital to modern medicine, from genetic engineering to immunotherapies. Suzanne O'Sullivan, reviewing in The Guardian, explains the book as a tool for "the reader to imagine they are an astronaut investigating the cell as if it is an unknown spacecraft".

=== Criticism and response ===
In his 2016 article "Same but different" in The New Yorker, Mukherjee attributed the most important genetic functions to epigenetic factors (such as histone modification and DNA methylation). Giving an analogy of his mother and her twin sister, he explains:

Chance events—injuries, infections, infatuations; the haunting trill of that particular nocturne—impinge on one twin and not on the other. Genes are turned on and off in response to these events, as epigenetic marks are gradually layered above genes, etching the genome with its own scars, calluses, and freckles.

Mukherjee also claimed that understanding of epigenetics "would overturn fundamental principles of biology, including our understanding of evolution," as he said:

Conceptually, a key element of classical Darwinian evolution is that genes do not retain an organism's experiences in a permanently heritable manner. Jean-Baptiste Lamarck, in the early nineteenth century, had supposed that when an antelope strained its neck to reach a tree its efforts were somehow passed down and its progeny evolved into giraffes. Darwin discredited that model. Giraffes, he proposed, arose through heritable variation and natural selection—a tall-necked specimen appears in an ancestral tree-grazing animal, and, perhaps during a period of famine, this mutant survives and is naturally selected. But, if epigenetic information can be transmitted through sperm and eggs, an organism would seem to have a direct conduit to the heritable features of its progeny. Such a system would act as a wormhole for evolution—a shortcut through the glum cycles of mutation and natural selection... Lamarck is being rehabilitated into the new Darwin.

The article, an excerpt from the chapter "The First Derivative of Identity" of his book The Gene: An Intimate History, "unleashed a torrent of criticism" from geneticists, as The Guardian book review wrote. As David Hornby of the University of Sheffield put it: "all (scientific) hell broke loose! It seemed to some that the slumbering giant of Lamarck was about to gain a new audience." Mukherjee foresaw the reaction, as he noted: "These fantasies should invite skepticism."

The article was critiqued by geneticists such as Mark Ptashne, at the Memorial Sloan Kettering Cancer Center, and John Greally, at the Albert Einstein College of Medicine, because of overemphasis on histone modification and DNA methylation. They commented that these two processes have only minor influences in overall gene function. Steven Henikoff, at the Fred Hutchinson Cancer Research Center, opined that, "Mukherjee seemed not to realize that transcription factors occupy the top of the hierarchy of epigenetic information," and said, "histone modifications at most act as cogs in the machinery." Omission of transcription factors was viewed as an "overarching" mistake, as Richard Mann at the Columbia University Medical Center remarked: "Only a talmudic-like reading can reveal a hint that something other than histone modifications are at play."

It is now generally believed that histone modification and DNA methylations are major factors of epigenetic functions, aging and certain diseases, and with an ability to influence transcription factors. However, they contribute little to development. In response, Mukherjee did admit that omission of transcription factors "was an error" on his part. However, The New Yorker defended the article that: "None of it negates the fundamental importance of transcription factors."

Jerry Coyne of the University of Chicago remarked: "Until there is evidence for this kind of evolutionary transformation—ANY evidence, people should stop yammering about this kind of 'Lamarckian' evolution." Phillip Ball, British science writer and editor of the journal Nature, also agreed that Mukherjee certainly "got some things wrong". Writing in the Prospect, he said, "Such claims [that some epigenetic changes can be inherited] are controversial—but even if they prove to be true, it seems highly unlikely that the effect will persist for many generations or will have long-term consequences for human evolution." According to Ute Deichmann of the Ben-Gurion University of the Negev, even if there are evidences of variation by epigenetic inheritance, they would not be counted as Lamarckian as they are not acquired or adaptive.

Mukherjee did not say that epigenetic processes have established Lamarckism, as he noted in his article that "epigenetic scratch marks are rarely, if ever, carried forward across generations." In an interview on NPR, he said, "[Lamarckian inheritance is] very rarely true and I would say almost never true".

Mukherjee also criticises the IQ test as a measure of intelligence, and endorses the theory of multiple intelligences (introduced by Howard Gardner) over general intelligence. He argues that the results of IQ tests for determining general intelligence do not represent intelligence in the real world. Reviewing the book in The Spectator, Stuart Ritchie, a psychologist at the University of Edinburgh, remarked that Gardner's theory is "debunked" and that "general intelligence is probably the most well-replicated phenomenon in all of psychological science."

== Bibliography ==
=== Books ===
- The Emperor of All Maladies: A Biography of Cancer (2010) (ISBN 978-0-00-725092-9).
- The Laws of Medicine: Field Notes from an Uncertain Science (2015) (ISBN 978-1-4711-4185-0). (Note: Siddhartha Mukherjee, The Laws of Medicine: Field Notes from an Uncertain Science, Simon & Schuster, 2015 (page visited on 10 December 2015).)
- The Gene: An Intimate History (2016) (ISBN 978-1476733500). (Note: James Gleick, "The Gene, by Siddhartha Mukherjee, New York Times May 15, 2016 review)
- The Song of the Cell: An Exploration of Medicine and the New Human (2022) (ISBN 9781982117351).

=== Essays and reporting ===
- Mukherjee, Siddhartha (1 March 2021). "The COVID conundrum: why does the pandemic seem far deadlier in some countries than in others?". Coronavirus Chronicles. The New Yorker. 97 (2): 18–24. (Note: Online version is titled "Why does the pandemic seem to be hitting some countries harder than others?".)
- Siddhartha Mukherjee, "Early Warnings: New technologies promise to catch more cancers sooner. But such screening can pose hidden hazards", The New Yorker, 23 June 2025, pp. 36–43. "In 2021... the United States spent more than forty billion dollars on cancer screening. On average, a year's worth of screening yields nine million positive results—of which 8.8 million are false. Millions endure follow-up scans, biopsies, and anxiety so that just over two hundred thousand true positives can be found, of which an even smaller fraction can be cured by local treatment, like excision. [p. 38.] Early work with cell-free DNA hints [that] blood tests... may one day tell us not only where a cancer began but whether it's likely to pose a threat to health. For now... hope still outpaces certainty and the holy grail of perfect screening remains just out of reach." (p. 43.)

———————

Bibliography notes

== Awards and honours ==
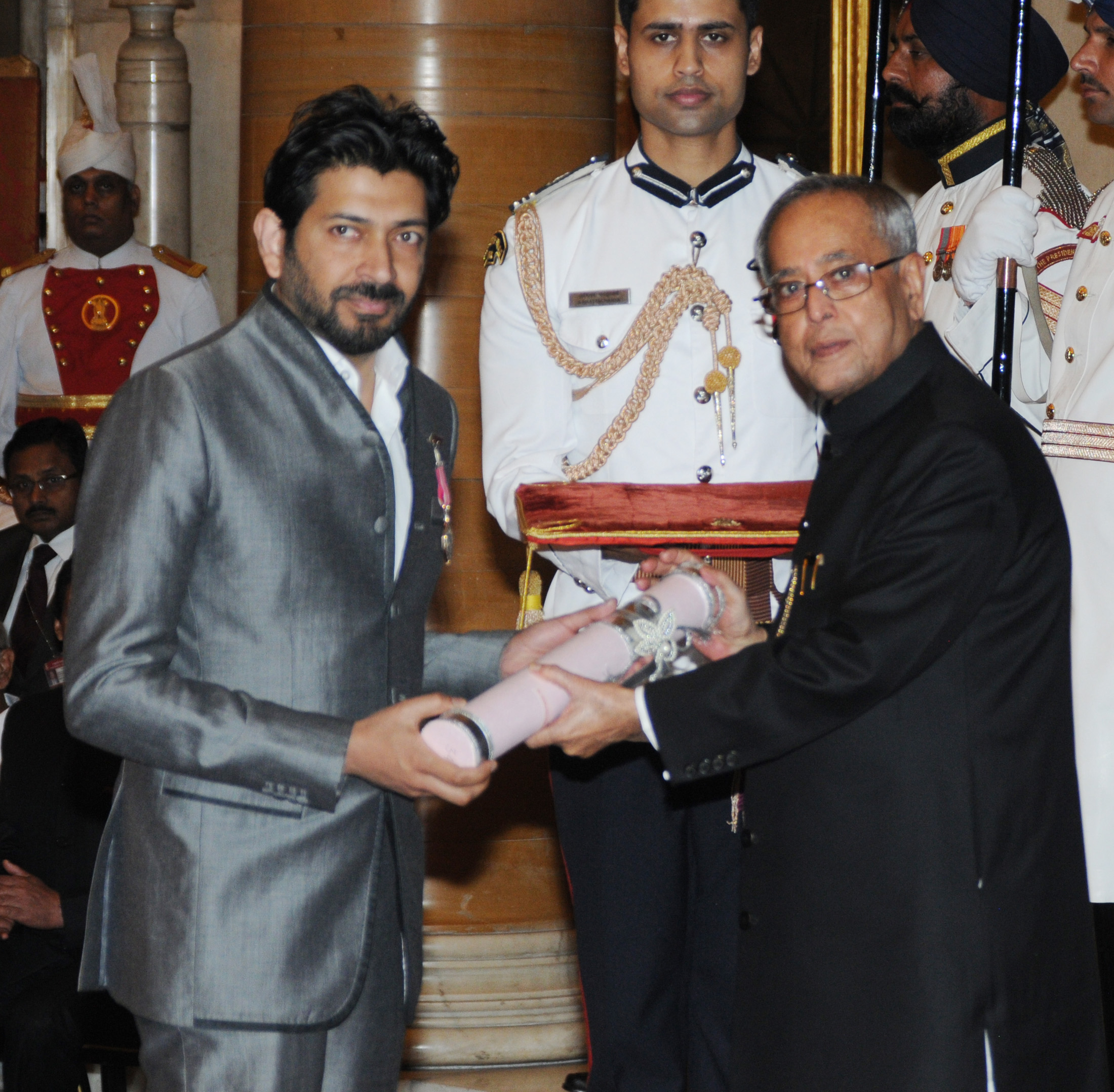
Siddhartha Mukherjee receiving Padma Shri Award from Pranab Mukherjee, President of India, at Rashtrapati Bhavan in New Delhi on 26 April 2014

Mukherjee has won many awards including:

- 1993: Rhodes Scholarship, 1993–1996.
- 2010: Gabrielle Angel's Leukemia Foundation Award 2010.
- 2010: New York Times Magazine, "100 Notable Books of 2010" for The Emperor of All Maladies.
- 2011: Los Angeles Times Book Award, Finalist in the category of Science & Technology for The Emperor of All Maladies.
- 2011: Pulitzer Prize for The Emperor of All Maladies.
- 2011: PEN/E. O. Wilson Literary Science Writing Award for The Emperor of All Maladies.
- 2011: Cancer Leadership Award (shared with Kathleen Sebelius and Orrin Hatch).
- 2011: National Book Critics Circle Award, finalist for The Emperor of All Maladies.
- 2011: Time magazine, 100 best non-fiction books of all time for The Emperor of All Maladies.
- 2011: Time 100, most influential people.
- 2011: Wellcome Trust Book Prize shortlist for The Emperor of All Maladies.
- 2011: Guardian First Book Award for The Emperor of All Maladies.
- 2012: Boston Public Library Literary Lights 2012.
- 2014: Padma Shri, the fourth highest civilian award by Government of India.
- 2016: The Royal Society Insight Investment Science Book Prize 2016 (shortlisted) for The Gene.
- 2016: Baillie Gifford Prize for Non-Fiction longlist for The Gene.
- 2016: Washington Post's "10 Best Books of 2016" for The Gene.
- 2017: Phi Beta Kappa Society Book Award in Science for The Gene.
- 2017: Wellcome Book Prize (shortlisted) for The Gene.
- 2018: Honorary doctorate degrees in medicine from the Royal College of Surgeons of Ireland, and from the University of Southern California.
- 2020 Mukherjee was named by Carnegie Corporation of New York as an honoree of the Great Immigrants Awards
- 2023: The Song of the Cell: An Exploration of Medicine and the New Human. Notable Book, American Library Association. Reference and User Services Association.
- 2023: Elected to the National Academy of Medicine.
- 2024: Will receive an honorary Doctor of Sciences from University of Pennsylvania.

== Personal life ==
Mukherjee lives in New York and has two daughters. He was divorced in 2025 from artist Sarah Sze, winner of a MacArthur "Genius" grant and representative of the United States to the 2013 Venice Biennale.

== See also ==
- Indians in the New York City metropolitan area
- List of Indian Americans
