= The Song of the Cell =

2022 book by Siddhartha Mukherjee

The Song of the Cell: An Exploration of Medicine and the New Human
- Author: Siddhartha Mukherjee
- Language: English
- Subject: Cell biology
- Genre: Nonfiction
- Publisher: The Bodley Head, Charles Scribner's Sons
- Publication date: 2 November 2022
- Publication place: United States
- Pages: 496
- ISBN: 1847925979

The Song of the Cell: An Exploration of Medicine and the New Human is a book on the history of the human understanding of cell biology, written by Siddhartha Mukherjee, an Indian-born American physician and oncologist, who is Assistant Professor of Medicine at Columbia University.

== Background ==
Song of the Cell is Mukherjee's fourth book. He is the author of the 2011 "biography of cancer" The Emperor of All Maladies, which won the Pullitzer Prize for General Nonfiction. It was published by The Bodley Head in the United Kingdom and Scribner in the United States.

== Content ==
The book tells the history of human understanding of the cell.

In recounting the early history in the field, Murkherjee focuses on telling the stories of figures such as Robert Hooke, who first coined the term cell after viewing a small piece of cork under a microscope. The book is written for a general readership and there is an emphasis on explaining the roles of cells. The book also examines current concerns, such as on the use of stem cells within regenerative medicine.

== Reception ==
Song of the Cell was positively reviewed. Tom Whipple of The Times called it "a wonderfully ambitious overview of cell biology". In The Guardian Suzanne O'Sullivan felt the imagery could sometimes be too simplistic, but praised the book as "a masterclass in cell function". Jennifer Szalai of The New York Times was especially appreciative of the metaphors, such as "gunslinging sheriff" for antibody and "gumshoe detective" for T cell, which Mukherjee uses to explain the development of cell biology. Robin McKie of The Observer called the book "free of overly complex detail" and "assured".
