= Joel E. Cohen =

American mathematician

Joel Ephraim Cohen
- Born: February 10, 1944 (age 82)
- Education: Harvard University; A.B. in applied mathematics (1965); A.M. in applied mathematics (1967); Ph.D. in applied mathematics (1970); M.P.H. (1970); Dr.P.H (1973)
- Awards: MacArthur Fellowship (1981); Fellow of the American Statistical Association (1987); Fred L. Soper Award (1997); Tyler Prize for Environmental Achievement (1999); Golden Goose Award (2015)
- Scientific career
- Workplaces: Rockefeller University; Columbia University; Harvard University
- Theses: Casual Groups of Monkeys and Men: Stochastic Models of Elemental Social Systems (1970); Population Biology of Infectious Disease: Selected Aspects of Malaria and Schistosomiasis (1973)
- Website: lab.rockefeller.edu/cohenje

Joel Ephraim Cohen NAS AAA&S APS CFR AAAS (born February 10, 1944) is a mathematical biologist. He is Abby Rockefeller Mauzé Professor of Populations at the Rockefeller University in New York City as of 2025 and at the Earth Institute of Columbia University, where he holds a joint appointment in the Department of Earth and Environmental Sciences, the Department of Ecology, Evolution and Environmental Biology, and the School of International and Public Affairs. He is also a member of the Council on Foreign Relations.

== Education ==
Cohen grew up in Washington, D.C., and Michigan and graduated from Cranbrook School in 1961. He received his Bachelor of Arts degree in applied mathematics from Harvard University in 1965, and earned a Ph.D. in applied mathematics from Harvard in 1970. In 1973, he received from Harvard another doctorate in population sciences and tropical public health. He received an honorary master's degree from the University of Cambridge in 1974.

== Research ==
Cohen has since taught or lectured at Harvard University, Yale University, Stanford University, the Technion-Israel Institute of Technology, the College of Notre Dame of Maryland, the National University of San Luis, Argentina, the Central University of Venezuela, and the University of California, Berkeley. He has also held numerous fellowships, including ones with the Harvard Society of Fellows, John Simon Guggenheim Foundation, the Japan Society for the Promotion of Science, and the John D. and Catherine T. MacArthur Foundation.

He was named "One of America's Top 100 Young Scientists" by Science Digest in 1984. His research has won him numerous awards, including the Sheps Award from the Population Association of America in 1992, the Distinguished Statistical Ecologist Award in 1994, the first Olivia Schieffelin Nordberg Award "for excellence in writing in the population sciences" in 1997, the Fred L. Soper Prize in 1998 of the Pan American Health Organization for his collaborative work on Chagas' disease, and the Tyler Prize for Environmental Achievement in 1999. He is also a member of the National Academy of Sciences, the American Academy of Arts and Sciences and the American Philosophical Society and has served on the governing boards of all three organizations.

He served as a Special Master and member of the Selection Panel in the silicone gel breast implant products liability litigation before the United States District Court, Northern District of Alabama (Southern Division) in 1996; and as a U.S. Federal Court-appointed neutral expert (under Federal Rule of Civil Procedure 706) for projection of asbestos-related claims against the Manville Personal Injury Settlement Trust, in the combined asbestos litigation in the Eastern and Southern Districts of New York, 1991–1995. He was a consultant to the law firm of Milbank, Tweed, Hadley and McCloy, New York, on the epidemiology of asbestos-related diseases from 1982 to 1986.

Cohen was a member of the Board of Directors of The Nature Conservancy, Arlington, VA, 2000–2009, during which he co-chaired the Science Council, 2005–2009. He was also a member of the Board of Trustees of the New York State Nature Conservancy, 2001–2010, the Population Reference Bureau, Washington, DC, 2004–2010, and the Committee on Science, Technology and Law of the National Research Council, Washington, DC, 2000–2009.

== Personal life ==
He was married to Audrey J. Biller from 1970 to 2002. Their son is Adam Cohen, Professor of Chemistry and Chemical Biology and of Physics at Harvard University. Their daughter is Zoe Cohen, a manager at Doximity in San Francisco.

== Publications ==
Cohen is the author or editor of 14 books and over 370 articles, including:

- Food webs and niche space
- How Many People Can the Earth Support?
- Comparison of Stochastic Matrices, with Applications in Information Theory, Statistics, Economics and Population Sciences
- Forecasting Product Liability Claims: Epidemiology and Modeling in the Manville Asbestos Case
- Educating All Children: A Global Agenda
- International Perspectives on the Goals of Universal Basic and Secondary Education
- Mathematics Is Biology's Next Microscope
- Human population: the next half century
- The population biology of invasive species
- Food web patterns and their consequences
