= Evelyne Pease Tyner =

Biochemist and environmentalist

Evelyn Pease Tyner née Pease (1924–2015) was a biochemist and environmentalist.

== Background ==
Tyner was born in Evansville, Indiana. Tyner won the first Westinghouse Science Talent Search essay assignment was “How Science Can Help Win the War” in 1942, Tyner suggested to solve the rubber shortage with “Rubber from Weeds”, and submitted three rubbery substances she had prepared, including one from the common milkweed. This enabled Tyner to work as a lab assistant during the summers in the research department of Mead Johnson & Co while attending Evansville College before transferring to the University of Michigan. Tyner went on to study a Ph.D. in Biological Chemistry on “The anti-lipotropic activity of cysteine”, graduating in 1950 and then marrying David A. Tyner, a chemistry student who had worked on the Manhattan Project. Tyner then moved to the University of Wisconsin at Madison to research the synthesis of DNA, RNA and proteins (before the structure of DNA was determined) and published a paper on the relationship between the A-T and G-C bases. In 1954 Tyner established the extracurricular Science Seminar at Niles West High School in Skokie.

== Conservation work ==
In 1963, Tyner campaigned to help save an area of virgin prairie in Glenview, which raised its profile as a valuable habitat and led to the University of Illinois at Chicago purchasing the land, which is now known as the James B. Woodworth Prairie Preserve. Tyner then campaigned to save The Grove and then a 32-acre plot at Kent Fuller Air Station Prairie in Glenview; this led to her being known as one of the “Frog and Fern Ladies”. The Evelyn Pease Tyner Interpretive Center was built in 2006, and in 2007 the project was awarded the Platinum certification for Leadership in Energy and Environmental Design (LEED) due to the center's vegetated roof which combined native and ornamental plants.
