= Entagen =

American software company

- Founded: 2008
- Founder: Christopher Bouton
- Defunct: 2013
- Headquarters: Boston, MA, USA
- Area served: Worldwide
- Products: Big Data Integration & Analytics

Entagen is an American software company founded in 2008 by Christopher Bouton. It develops software for big data integration and analytics. Entagen was purchased by Thomson Reuters in 2013.

== History ==
Entagen was founded by Christopher Bouton in 2008. Entagen's technologies were named "Innovative Technology of the Year in Big Data" in 2012 by the Massachusetts Technology Leadership Council and Entagen was named a Gartner "Cool Vendor" in the Life Sciences in 2013.

Entagen was acquired by Thomson Reuters in October, 2013 for an undisclosed amount.

== Corporate structure ==
According to Entagen, a portion of Entagen's employees were based at its Minneapolis facility where its software engineering division is located while headquarters, systems architecture and data sciences groups were located in the Boston area.

== Products and services ==
According to Entagen, it develops data integration and analytics software products including TripleMap and Extera. Following the acquisition of Entagen by Thomson Reuters, Entagen technologies were incorporated into the Cortellis family of products.
