= KIF1A =

Motor protein in humans

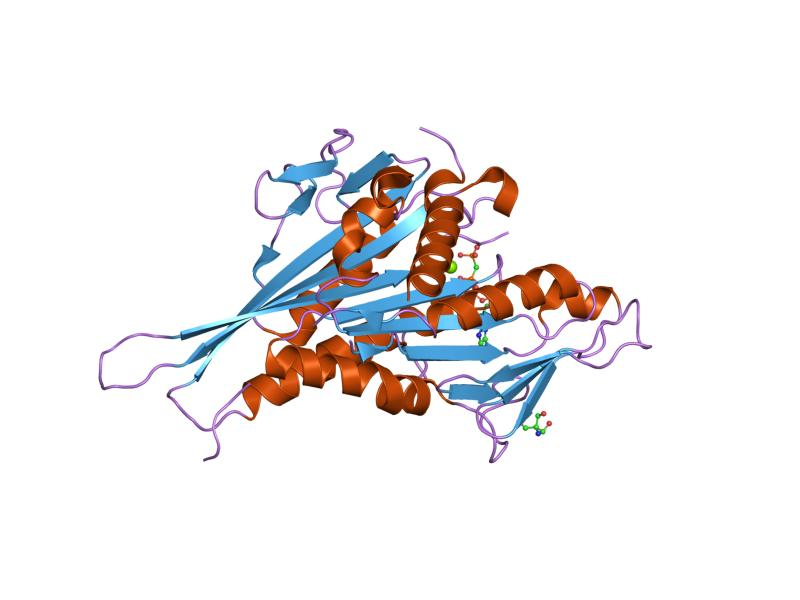

Identifiers
- Aliases: KIF1A, ATSV, C2orf20, HSN2C, MRD9, SPG30, UNC104, kinesin family member 1A
- External IDs: OMIM: 601255; MGI: 108391; GeneCards: KIF1A
Available structures
PDB	Ortholog search: PDBe RCSB
PDB	List of PDB id codes 4EGX, 4EJQ, 4UXO, 4UXP, 4UXR, 4UXS
Enzyme activity
EC #	BRENDA	ExPASy	KEGG	MetaCyc
5.6.1.3	↗	↗	↗	↗

Gene location (Human)
Chr.	Chromosome 2 (human)
Band	2q37.3	Start	240,713,761 bp
Band	2q37.3	End	240,821,036 bp

Gene location (Mouse)
Chr.	Chromosome 1 (mouse)
Band	1|1 D	Start	92,943,186 bp
Band	1|1 D	End	93,029,673 bp
RNA expression pattern
Bgee	Human / Mouse (ortholog); Top expressed in: right frontal lobe; postcentral gyrus; lateral nuclear group of thalamus; cerebellar vermis; pons; anterior cingulate cortex; pars compacta; right hemisphere of cerebellum; amygdala; dorsolateral prefrontal cortex / Top expressed in: superior frontal gyrus; dentate gyrus of hippocampal formation granule cell; neural layer of retina; cerebellar cortex; medial dorsal nucleus; primary visual cortex; habenula; dorsomedial hypothalamic nucleus; medial geniculate nucleus; pontine nuclei; More reference expression data
BioGPS	n/a
Gene ontology
Molecular function	microtubule binding; microtubule motor activity; nucleotide binding; ATPase activity; cytoskeletal motor activity; ATP binding; identical protein binding; protein homodimerization activity; plus-end-directed microtubule motor activity
Cellular component	cytoplasm; microtubule; cytoskeleton; kinesin complex; axon cytoplasm; axon; cytosol; synaptic vesicle; dendrite; soma; presynapse; postsynapse; protein-containing complex; neuron projection
Biological process	microtubule-based movement; anterograde axonal transport; interkinetic nuclear migration; protein transport along microtubule; vesicle-mediated transport; cytoskeleton-dependent intracellular transport; anterograde neuronal dense core vesicle transport; retrograde neuronal dense core vesicle transport
Sources:Amigo / QuickGO
Orthologs
Databases	NCBI: entry; OMA: entry
Species	Human	Mouse
Entrez	547	16560
Ensembl	ENSG00000130294	ENSMUSG00000014602
UniProt	Q12756	P33173
RefSeq (mRNA)	NM_001244008; NM_004321; NM_001320705; NM_001330289; NM_001330290	NM_001110315; NM_001294149; NM_001294150; NM_008440; NM_001368847
RefSeq (protein)	NP_001230937; NP_001307634; NP_001317218; NP_001317219; NP_004312	n/a
Location (UCSC)	Chr 2: 240.71 – 240.82 Mb	Chr 1: 92.94 – 93.03 Mb
PubMed search
- Wikidata
View/Edit Human	View/Edit Mouse

Kinesin-like protein KIF1A, also known as axonal transporter of synaptic vesicles or microtubule-based motor KIF1A, is a protein that in humans is encoded by the KIF1A gene.

KIF1A is a neuron-specific member of the kinesin-3 family and is a microtubule plus end-directed motor protein involved in the anterograde, long-distance transport of vesicles and organelles. Similar to other kinesin proteins, KIF1A harnesses the chemical energy released from Adenosine Triphosphate (ATP) hydrolysis to create mechanical force, allowing it to "walk" along microtubule filaments to transport cargo from the neuron cell body to its periphery. With an important role in the brain, KIF1A function is essential for physiological processes, such as neuronal survival and higher brain function.

== History ==
KIF1A was originally discovered in C. elegans as UNC-104 in 1991 as a possible novel kinesin paralog acting as a motor in the nervous system. In 1995, human KIF1A was first identified to be a monomeric, globular motor protein that was shown at the time to have the fastest anterograde motor activity. It was also found that KIF1A expressed abundantly in neurons, suggesting its role in axons as an axonal transport motor. To further elucidate the function of KIF1A, in vivo studies were conducted in mice. KIF1A knock-out mice showed deficiency in synaptic vesicle transport and early death soon after birth, suggesting KIF1A's critical role in the viability of neurons and the transport of synaptic vesicle precursors.

In 1999, a new model regarding KIF1A motility, contrary to the widely accepted dimeric, two-headed "walking model," depicted that KIF1A can move processively on microtubules as a monomer in single molecule experiments. As the debate on whether KIF1A functioned as a monomer or dimer ensued, further research in the cryo-EM field resolved the structure of KIF1A and identified the K-loop, a 12-amino acid insert at the L12 region indicated to increase KIF1A's affinity to microtubules. In other efforts to uncover the function of important KIF1A structures, it was reported that the binding of KIF1A's pleckstrin homology (PH) domain to lipids (PtdIns(4,5)P2) is necessary and sufficient for the binding and transporting of vesicles. Further investigations of how the PtdIns(4,5)P2 lipid subdomain facilitates KIF1A vesicle transport led to the idea that this membrane subdomain may cause KIF1A monomers to cluster or dimerize, which would then activate motor activity. Continuing with KIF1A's monomer vs. dimer debate, the proposition that KIF1A functioned as a monomeric motor was challenged with a mechanism similar to that found in conventional kinesin. It was then suggested that KIF1A can dimerize to operate as a two-headed motor and that motility can be regulated by motor dimerization, leading to the conclusion that KIF1A is monomeric in an inactive state, and dimeric in an active state. As to where the debate stands now, more recent research has shown that KIF1A is dimeric in both active and inactive states and that motor activity is instead regulated by autoinhibition.

== Function ==
KIF1A belongs to the kinesin-3 subfamily and is characterized by its very high microtubule binding rate and its ability to travel further and faster along microtubules compared to other kinesin family groups. With run lengths on the order of 10 um, nearly 10 times longer than those of the well-characterized kinesin-1 motor, KIF1A carries a diverse set of cargo that must be delivered in a precise spatiotemporal manner to ensure proper neuronal function and viability. As KIF1A is predominantly expressed in neurons in the brain, with low levels observed in tissues of the heart, testes, pancreas, adrenal glands, and pituitary glands, it plays a critical role in the axonal (cell body to axon terminal) and dendritic (cell body to dendrites) transport of cargo.

The main function of KIF1A is the long-distance transport of membranous cargo, such as synaptic vesicle precursors (SVPs) and dense core vesicles (DCVs), that are essential for the maintenance and viability of neurons. KIF1A is one of the many motors that helps execute the transport of organelles within the cell through axonal anterograde cargo transport and is shown to carry cargo that contain SV proteins, such as synaptophysin, synaptotagmin, and Rab3A, that are essential for SV biogenesis and membrane fusion. Another primary role of KIF1A is the axonal transport of DCVs to their appropriate subcellular sites, which are synthesized in the cell body and then transported by KIF1A to pre- and postsynaptic release sites. DCVs are important in helping with the transport, processing, and secretion of neuropeptide cargos that mediate a number of biological processes, such as neuronal development, survival, and learning and memory, making the role of KIF1A in regard to DCVs absolutely essential for normal neuronal function. In addition, KIF1A is important for sensory neuronal function and survival by transporting the TrkA neurotrophin receptor critically involved in the NGF/TrkA/Ras/PI3K signaling pathway that plays a role in pain sensation.

== Structure ==
In H. sapiens, KIF1A is a motor protein composed of 1,791 amino acids in length. Similar to other kinesins, KIF1A's structure consists of a neck, a tail, and a motor domain. At the N-terminus is a motor domain that is followed by the neck coil (NC). A series of coiled coils (CCs) and a forkhead associated (FHA) domain follows, with the order being CC1, FHA domain, CC2, and CC3. The C-terminus then ends in a pleckstrin homology (PH) domain that associates with cargo. Unique to KIF1A is its K-loop, organization of its neck region, and FHA domain located in the tail.

=== Motor domain ===
The motor domain, composed of a globular catalytic core and a neck linker, is located at the N-terminus of the molecule and combines microtubule binding and ATPase activity to power along the plus ends of microtubules. The catalytic core contains the ATPase reaction centre and the microtubule binding surface while the neck linker functions to connect the catalytic core to the remaining molecule. Within the motor domain lies a layer of β-sheets nestled in between two layers of α-helices. In the N-terminal half of the catalytic core is the ATP hydrolysis catalytic centre and the phosphate binding loop (P-loop) that forms a nucleotide binding pocket on top of the catalytic core. Located at the C-terminal end of the catalytic core are five structural elements (loop L11, α4 helix, loop L12, α5 helix, loop L13) that make up the region called switch II, which is responsible for forming the microtubule binding surface. The combined functions of switch II and the neck linker function together to produce mechanical work. Switch I, the link between the P-loop and switch II, works to catalyze ATP hydrolysis and moves to change conformation depending on the nucleotide binding pocket's nucleotide state. Salt bridge rearrangements between switch I and switch II accompany these conformational changes, which leads to larger scale repositioning and conformational changes in switch II. Overall, switch I connects the reaction centre chemical state to the microtubule binding surface of switch II.

KIF1A uses the ATP hydrolysis cycle that is coupled to the conformational changes within the motor and neck domains to convert chemical energy into mechanical work, thus allowing for forward directional movement of the motor. As a result of ATP turnover throughout the cycle, microtubule binding affinities of the motor domains change, permitting the "hand over hand" walking movement seen conserved in most kinesin motility.

=== Tail and neck domains ===
Within the tail region are several short coiled coils and an array of protein-lipid interaction domains that help with the binding of cargo and regulators. These coiled coils function to mediate and at times interfere with motor dimerization. In regard to the organization of the neck region, it consists of a helix and β-sheet. The neck coil, an α-helical region, has been shown to help to dimerize motor domains and can effectively dimerize on its own. The neck linker is used to connect the motor domain to cargo and to kinesin partner heads. These elements work together as the neck coil couples the motor domain's conformational changes regulated by ATP hydrolysis to the neck linker, which drives the hand-over-hand walking mechanism of KIF1A.

=== K-Loop ===
KIF1A also possesses a stretch of 12 lysine residues known as the K-loop located on loop 12 of the motor domain that is responsible for much of KIF1A's characteristic behavior, particularly its motility and regulation. The interaction between the positively charged lysine-rich surface and the negatively charged glutamate rich (E hook) C-terminal tail of β-tubulin has been shown to increase KIF1A's microtubule affinity. Although there is an increase in microtubule affinity, the increase in KIF1A processivity is not attributed directly to the K-loop. Rather, the increased microtubule binding rate due to the K-loop allows multiple sites of KIF1A (residues in loops L2, L7, L8, L11, L12, and α4 and α6 helices) to interact with the microtubule surface. These interactions increase affinity, which in turn increase the processivity of dimeric KIF1A. The K-loop is also required for several microtubule associated proteins (MAPs), such as septin-9 and MAP9, to exert their effects on KIF1A. Additionally, the K-loop facilitates KIF1A's interaction between the positively charged lysine-rich region and neuronal tubulin's negatively charged polyglutamylated C-terminal tails.

=== PH and FHA Domain ===
KIF1A's pleckstrin homology (PH) domain, located in the tail region, functions to bind cargo vesicles through interactions with phosphatidylinositol 4,5-bisphosphate (PtdIns(4,5)P2). The forkhead associated (FHA) domain, a small protein module located amongst the coiled coils in the tail domain, plays a structural role and functions to mediate specific cargo interactions via protein-protein interactions and phosphothreonine epitope recognition.

== Regulation ==
KIF1A has many mechanisms in place to regulate activation, deactivation, energy conservation, and specific control of directional motor activity. These mechanisms include autoinhibition, cargo binding, Rab GTPases, protein interactions.

=== Autoinhibition ===
KIF1A exists in two forms: an extended active state and a folded inactive state. It adopts a compact shape with a folded tail in its inactive state to prevent crowding on microtubules and unnecessary energy waste, which can then be extended in its active state. Although the specifics underlying the causes and regulation of KIF1A autoinhibition needs further investigation, there are two current models that explain this process. The monomer-dimer switch model states that intramolecular interactions regarding the neck and tail regions hold kinesin-3 motors in an inactive, monomeric state. When activated, the motors would then dimerize from interactions between the tail and neck coil regions. Alternatively, in the tail block model, motors act as stable dimers and are inactivated by the tail region interacting with the motor or neck domains. It has been suggested that the autoinhibited state of KIF1A involves CC2 and the FHA domain, where CC2 folds back to interact with the FHA domain and causes a disruption to motor activity. This state of autoinhibition is reversed by cargo binding, phosphorylation, or other regulatory mechanisms. As recent studies have shown that KIF1A is dimeric in both active and inactive states, the tail block model is more readily accepted to explain the process of autoinhibition. With these proposed models, there is a better understanding of the autoinhibition mechanism; however, further investigations are needed to confirm and uncover the specifics of this process in KIF1A.

=== Cargo binding ===
Autoinhibited or inactive KIF1A can be activated from cargo binding directly to the motor. Often, cargo adapter proteins are used to mediate motor activation and cargo recruitment. In UNC-104, the C. elegans homolog for KIF1A, the binding of adapter proteins such as, UNC-16 (JIP3), DNC-1 (DCTN-1/Glued), and SYD-2 (Liprin-α) to UNC-104 lead to the translocation of the motor to different subcellular regions in neuronal cells. These observations suggest that adapters can recruit UNC-104/KIF1A to their cargo and navigate transport. Additionally, studies have shown that LIN-2 (CASK) and SYD-2 positively regulate UNC-104 by increasing its velocity. LIN-2 also increases run lengths and is suggested to be an activator of UNC-104.

=== Rab GTPases ===
Rab GTPases are known to mediate the localization of vesicles from the regulation of GEFs and GAPs that alter its nucleotide state (GTP or GDP). KIF1A is known to transport Rab3-coated vesicles in the axon. Rab3 functions as a synaptic vesicle protein that controls the exocytosis of synaptic vesicles. Studies have shown that a GEF for Rab3, DENN/MAD, binds to Rab3 and KIF1A's tail domain to mediate the motor's transport to the axon terminal.

=== Other protein interactions ===
Microtubule associated proteins (MAPs) mediate the assembly and disassembly kinetics of microtubules and regulate the interactions of motors with microtubules. Several MAPs are known KIF1A-regulators. Both tau and MAP2, and MAP7 acts as a general inhibitor of KIF1A, preventing it from accessing the microtubule lattice. Three MAPs that localize within dendrites, doublecortin (DCX), doublecortin-like kinase-1 (DCLK1), and MAP9, regulate motor protein activity more broadly by differentially gating access to microtubule filaments. Specifically, DCX, DCLK1, and MAP9 permit KIF1A access to the microtubule, thereby providing a "MAP code" of kinesin regulation in neurons. DCLK1 is shown to mediate KIF1A's transport of DCVs binding to microtubules in dendrites. MAP9 is known to facilitate KIF1A translocation. Additionally, a microtubule associated septin (SEPT9), which localizes specifically in dendrites, has been shown to enhance kinesin-3 motility further into neuronal dendrites via the recognition of the K-Loop.

=== Tubulin post-translational modifications ===
Another form of KIF1A regulation is performed through tubulin post-translational modifications (PTMs), which usually occurs on the C-terminal tails of microtubule tracks. These molecular "traffic signals" include C-terminal tail polyglutamylation and help direct KIF1A motor cargo delivery via interactions between KIF1A's K-loop and microtubule's C-terminal tails. Studies have shown that polyglutamylation of the tubulin C-terminal tail regulates KIF1A by reducing KIF1A pausing as well as run lengths, suggesting a mechanism that mediates KIF1A behavior and motility. Additionally, it has been reported that α-tubulin polyglutamylation functions as a molecular traffic sign for KIF1A's cargo transport by directing the motor to its proper destination, therefore, mediating continuous synaptic transmission.

== Pathology ==
KIF1A-mediated anterograde axonal transport is of critical importance for the development and maintenance of the nervous system. With KIF1A functioning to transport synaptic vesicle precursors (SVPs) and dense core vesicles (DCVs) along neurons, defects in this motor protein can lead to the improper delivery of cargo and result in the deterioration of neuronal cells that can lead to pathologies. Studies conducted with UNC-104 have shown that loss-of-function UNC-104 mutants were not able to properly transport SVPs to synapses, which resulted in an abnormal accumulation of SVs in cell bodies and dendrites. Other studies depicted that low levels of SVPs in mice from disrupted KIF1A-mediated transport were detrimental to development and survival. Mice with homozygous inactivation of KIF1A showed severe motor and sensory disturbances; most died within 24 hours of birth and all died within 72 hours. Homozygous mice also showed reduced levels of SVPs and significant neurodegeneration and death. DCVs are also necessary for proper neuronal function, as they contain proteins such as BDNF that are essential for survival. BDNF is intimately connected with KIF1A and may provide explanation for the clinical presentation of the KIF1A knockdown phenotype. Loss of KIF1A-mediated BDNF transport results in decreased synaptogenesis and learning enhancement, whereas an up-regulation of KIF1A leads to the formation of presynaptic buttons.

In 2011, the first disease associated alleles of KIF1A were found to be related to Hereditary Spastic Paraplegia (HSP), a disorder characterized by abnormal gait and spasticity of lower limbs. With the usage of whole exome sequencing and homozygosity mapping, investigations discovered a causative mutation in KIF1A's motor domain that led to behavior characteristic of HSP. Additional studies found de novo missense mutations in KIF1A to affect protein function in cell culture systems, which suggests pathogenicity. These same mutations have also been reported in patients with intellectual disability and autism, which suggests that heterozygous KIF1A disruption may be involved in Nonsyndromic Intellectual Disability (NID). Studies regarding Hereditary Sensory and Autonomic Neuropathy type II (HSAN II), a rare autosomal-recessive disorder characterized by peripheral nerve degeneration that leads to severe distal sensory loss, found that KIF1A mutations in an alternatively spliced exon are a rare cause of HSAN II. Collectively, these investigations published in 2011 report on the relationships between KIF1A and hereditary human diseases. In contrast to the reports of KIF1A mutations resulting in loss of function behavior and reduced anterograde axonal transport, a recent study showed that some KIF1A mutations lead to hyperactivity of the KIF1A motor and increased axonal transport of SVPs, which can also be pathological. Additionally, most recent findings show that KIF1A variants, a majority of which are located in the motor domain, result in protein transport defects, such as reduced microtubule binding, reduced velocity and processivity, and increased non-motile rigor microtubule binding.

== Clinical significance ==
Various diseases and disorders are associated with KIF1A, including KIF1A-Associated Neurological Disorder (KAND), Hereditary Spastic Paraplegia, and ataxia. These disorders primarily affect the nervous system and have a diverse set of clinical presentations.

=== KIF1A-associated neurological disorder ===
KAND is a neurodegenerative disorder caused by one or more variations (mutations) in the KIF1A gene that can lead to a spectrum of symptoms, such as neurodevelopmental delay, intellectual disability, autism, microcephaly, progressive spastic paraplegia, periphery neuropathy, optic nerve atrophy, cerebral and cerebellar atrophy, and seizures. KAND has been diagnosed in over 200 patients throughout the world with the large majority being children due to the likely reason that advancements in genetic testing were only recently made more accessible. As of current, there are 119 different variants identified, but it is likely that there are many variants to be discovered. Depending on the type of variation that occurs and where it is in the gene, KAND patients experience a spectrum of symptoms, progression, and severity of disease. KAND can be inherited in an autosomal recessive or dominant pattern and is characterized as a spectrum disorder with a range of symptoms from mild to life-threatening. Because there are many KAND-causing mutations, predominantly heterozygous missense mutations in the KIF1A motor domain, diagnosis for this disease is complicated. In efforts to expand the understanding of the phenotypic spectrum of KIF1A variants, researchers discovered novel de novo KIF1A variants in patients with Rett syndrome (RTT) and severe neurodevelopmental disorder that share clinical features that overlap with KAND. From their microtubule gliding assays and neurite tip accumulation assays, they showed that these novel KIF1A variants reduced KIF1A velocity and microtubule binding and lessened the ability of KIF1A's motor domain to accumulate along neurites. The results from this study expanded the phenotypic characteristics seen in KAND individuals with KIF1A variants in the motor domain, as common clinical features were also observed in RTT individuals. Additionally, the first disease severity score for KAND was recently developed, with disease severity strongly associated with variants that occurs in protein regions involved with ATP and microtubule binding, more specifically the P-Loop, switch I, and switch II. The most severe KAND presentations are observed with mutations in KIF1A's motor domain, generally arising de novo, and the less severe variations are observed in KIF1A's stalk region and are usually inherited.

From recent studies, KIF1A variants are shown to exhibit defects such as reduced microtubule (MT) binding, reduced velocity and processivity, and increased non-motile rigor MT binding, all of which could contribute to the signs and symptoms seen in KAND patients. With a current natural history study in play and an established heuristic severity score for KAND, research efforts are progressing towards elucidating unknowns of the disorder and are pushing forward to find treatment. Because KAND can only be accurately diagnosed through genetic testing and there being similarities of its symptoms with Cerebral Palsy (CP), many patients are initially misdiagnosed. The overlap between CP and KAND, in conjunction with the prohibitive cost of genetic testing, leads to the belief that most KAND patients are yet to be correctly diagnosed, resulting in vastly underrepresented reported numbers of cases.

== Society and culture ==
KIF1A.org, a non-profit organization, dedicated to helping those affected by KAND and funding research to find a cure, was founded by Luke Rosen and Sally Jackson. In 2020, KIF1A.org was chosen to join the Rare As One Project launched by the Chan Zuckerberg Initiative (CZI). Spearheading these pre-clinical investigation efforts to find a treatment for KAND is Dr. Wendy Chung, MD, PhD, who leads the KIF1A program at Columbia University, manages the KIF1A Natural History Study, and plays a tremendous role in supporting the KAND community and organization.

On April 7, 2020, part one of The Gene: An Intimate History premiered on PBS, a Ken Burns documentary based on a book of the same name by Siddhartha Mukherjee. The documentary focuses the efforts of Rosen and Jackson, KIF1A.org, and researchers to find treatment for KAND patients.
