= Christopher Bouton =

Biologist, technologist, entrepreneur

- Born: Christopher M.L. Bouton; Chicago, Illinois
- Occupations: Technologist, entrepreneur
- Known for: Building Big Data software company Entagen, which was acquired by Thomson Reuters in October, 2013.

Christopher Bouton is the founder and CEO of Entagen, a software company in the Boston, Massachusetts area, which develops Big Data integration and analytics solutions. Entagen's technologies were named "Innovative Technology of the Year in Big Data" in 2012 by the Massachusetts Technology Leadership Council and Entagen was named a Gartner "Cool Vendor" in the Life Sciences in 2013.

Entagen was acquired by Thomson Reuters in October, 2013 for an undisclosed amount.

== Early life and education ==
Bouton's mother, Barbara Bouton, worked as an investment banker at Goldman Sachs and his father, Marshall Bouton, is a political scientist who most recently ran the Chicago Council on Global Affairs. Bouton was born in 1973 in Chicago, Illinois. His family moved from Chicago to Brooklyn, New York, New Delhi, India, Washington, DC and then back to Brooklyn.

Bouton attended Saint Ann's School (Brooklyn) for high school. While at Saint Ann's he was awarded sixth place in the Westinghouse Science Talent Search in 1992 for research that he performed at the Jackson Laboratory. He then attended Amherst College for his undergraduate education and Johns Hopkins University for his Ph.D.

While at Johns Hopkins, Bouton worked in the laboratory of Jonathan Pevsner who appeared as a Leonardo da Vinci expert and researcher on the show Doing DaVinci. While in Pevsner's lab, Bouton developed and released the "Database Referencing of Array Genes ONline" (DRAGON) database and DRAGON View analytics systems in 2002, which remains in wide use currently. During his doctoral research, Bouton also demonstrated that Synaptotagmin I, an important member of the molecular machinery which governs neurotransmitter release at the synaptic terminal, is a molecular target of lead which may in part contribute to the effects of lead poisoning. Bouton also published on the effects of lead on gene expression and the involvement of presenilins in Alzheimer's Disease.

== Career ==
Following graduation from Johns Hopkins University, Neuroscience Graduate Program, Bouton worked at LION Bioscience Research, Inc. (a subsidiary of LION bioscience AG)) and Aveo Pharmaceuticals (formerly GenPath Pharmaceuticals).

Bouton was recruited in 2004 to the position of Head of Integrative Data Mining at the Pfizer Research Technology Center in Boston, Massachusetts. While at Pfizer, Bouton is credited with having developed the Pfizerpedia, an organizational knowledge base.

In 2008, Bouton founded Entagen. Entagen developed a range of technologies that combined Linked Data and Big Data approaches including Extera and TripleMap. Entagen also participated in the hack/reduce community in the Cambridge, MA area from 2011 - 2014. Entagen's technologies were named "Innovative Technology of the Year in Big Data" in 2012 by the Massachusetts Technology Leadership Council and Entagen was named a Gartner "Cool Vendor" in the Life Sciences in 2013.

Bouton has published a number of papers about Big Data and data integration approaches.

== Personal life ==
Bouton was born in Chicago and has lived in New York, New Delhi, and Washington, DC. He currently lives in Newburyport, Massachusetts.
