= Wendy Chung =

American geneticist

- Born: Nebraska, USA
- Education: Rockefeller University, Cornell University
- Occupations: Clinical and molecular geneticist, physician
- Website: Hospital Webpage / Personal Webpage

Wendy K. Chung is an American clinical and molecular geneticist and physician. She is the Chair of the Department of Pediatrics at Boston Children's Hospital and is on the faculty at Harvard Medical School. She is the author of 700 peer-reviewed articles and 75 chapters and has won several awards as a physician, researcher, and professor. Chung helped to initiate a new form of newborn screening for spinal muscular atrophy which is used nationally and was among the plaintiffs in the Supreme Court case which banned gene patenting.

Her research "relates to rare genetic conditions including the molecular genetics of obesity and diabetes in rodents and humans, the genetic basis of congenital heart disease, cardiomyopathies, arrhythmias, long QT Syndrome, pulmonary hypertension, endocrinopathies, congenital diaphragmatic hernias, esophageal atresia/tracheoesophageal fistula, seizures, Intellectual disability, autism, inherited metabolic conditions and breast susceptibility."

== Early life and education ==
Chung was born in Nebraska and raised in southern Florida. Her parents were involved in science and medicine: her father was an organic chemistry professor and her mother worked in a medical laboratory. She was the first Miami-Dade County public high school student to win the Westinghouse Science Talent Search, the predecessor to the Regeneron Science Talent Search. In high school, Chung was valedictorian and a National Merit Scholar.

Chung earned a bachelor's degree in biochemistry and economics at Cornell University, graduating in 1990. She earned a Ph.D. in genetics from Rockefeller University in 1996 and a M.D. from Cornell University Medical College in 1998. She was a graduate student of Dr. Rudy Leibel at Rockefeller, who described her as a "triple threat" due to her capability as an "equally gifted scientist, clinician, and teacher." Chung also completed an internship, residency, and fellowship at the New York-Presbyterian Hospital, Columbia University Medical Center. Both her internship and residency were focused in pediatrics, while her two fellowships were focused in Molecular Genetics and Clinical Genetics.

== Career ==
Chung was the Kennedy Family Professor of Pediatrics at Columbia University and directed the Pediatric Neuromuscular Network Molecular Core, the New York Obesity Center Molecular Genetics Core and the Diabetes and Endocrine Research Center Molecular Genetics Core, among her positions. She holds board certifications in Clinical Genetics and Genomics (MD).

Chung's areas of expertise include newborn screening, rare genetic neurodevelopment disorders, autism, clinical genetics, developmental disorder, precision medicine, congenital anomaliess, breast cancer, cancer genetics, cardiomyopathy, esophageal atresia/tracheo esophageal atresia, congenital diaphragmatic hernia, congenital heart disease, diabetes, genetic counseling, inborn metabolic disorders, inherited arrhythmias, neurogenetics, obesity, pediatric seizures, pulmonary hypertension, rare cancer syndromes, arrhythmia, seizures, and spinal muscular atrophy. She is working on developing treatments for rare neurogenetic conditions, including KIF1A associated neurological disorder and other rare genetic diseases. She is an expert in ethical, legal and social implications of genetics and genomics.

Chung was named one of New York Magazine's "best doctors" and one of America's "top doctors" by Castle Connolly Medical Ltd. in a survey conducted when more than 250,000 "leading doctors" were asked to "name America's best physicians in various specialties."

=== Supreme Court Case Involvement ===
Chung was an original plaintiff in the Supreme Court case which overturned that ability to patent genes, Association for Molecular Pathology v. Myriad Genetics, Inc. Chung became a plaintiff with the ACLU after approaching both the NIH and Congress as she believed that the patenting of genes restricted access and quality of care the patients are eligible to receive. The court sided with the Association for Molecular Pathology unanimously, and determined that as genes are natural, they are not able to be patented. Chung believes that these decisions will allow patients to receive all the information resulting from genome sequencing, and allowing testing for specific diseases – such as the test for breast cancer – thus enabling patients to know more about their own health.

==== NewYork-Presbyterian / Columbia University Irving Medical Center ====
Chung was the Kennedy Family Professor of Pediatrics at Columbia University Vagelos College of Physicians and Surgeons (P&S) and directed the clinical genetics program until 2023. She has also received the Presidential Award for Outstanding Teaching from Columbia in recognition of her teaching and mentoring of students. Her work with children was carried out at NewYork-Presbyterian's Morgan Stanley Children's Hospital (MSCH), located at Columbia University Irving Medical Center (CUIMC).

Chung directed the fellowship program in Cytogenetics and Molecular Genetics at CUIMC, supervised medical education in human genetics at P&S, and was the director of the Clinical Cancer Genetics program and the DISCOVER and TREATMENT programs. She directs the GUARDIAN newborn screening program.

==== Simons Foundation ====
Chung directed clinical research at the Simons Foundation Autism Research Initiative. She leads both the Simons Foundation Powering Research through Knowledge (SPARK); which is seeking to create a large group of individuals with autism who contribute data in the form of genetic, medical, and behavioral information, and Simons Searchlight (previously known Simons Variation in Individuals Project) in which individuals with a variant in a specific segment of their genetic makeup increases their probability of autism are studied through various assessments and neuroimaging to identify new profiles which may be shared by these individuals. In these endeavors, Chung works to manage research programs, evaluate new treatments and medications, and develop novel outcome measures for evaluation of the new treatments. Furthermore, she seeks to identify gene associations with autism and the specific clinical features which may characterize particular gene associations. Alongside her research endeavors, Chung works with the families involved in the project to create community and help them to understand autism and its causes more completely.

== Research contributions ==
Throughout her career, Chung's research has largely focused on the genetic basis of human diseases, specifically learning the discovery of new genes and mutations associated with diseases, then implementing these revelations into clinical treatments. Throughout her career, Chung has discovered over 60 new genes that cause human diseases some of which bear her name including Okur-Chung neurodevelopmental syndrome, Chilton-Okur-Chung neurodevelopmental syndrome, and Chung–Jansen syndrome.

=== Obesity and diabetes ===
Chung worked primarily in research related to the influence of genetic variation in susceptibility to obesity and diabetes, using rodent genetic models as a foundation from which to expand research to humans. In this research, Chung was able to clone a rodent gene (leptin receptor) leading to obesity and regulation of body weight. Her later work expands to human obesity and diabetes susceptibility and prevention.

=== Inborn errors of metabolism ===
Working with less common disorders, Chung has researched mutations and disease associations with Wolfram syndrome, Wolman disease, Leigh syndrome, glycogen storage disease type III, and juvenile idiopathic arthritis.

=== Congenital anomalies ===
Chung's research on congenital anomalies focuses on determining the genetic basis of congenital anomalies, focusing predominately on congenital diaphragmatic hernia (through project DHREAMS), atresia (through project CARE) and congenital heart disease. The DHREAMS and CARE studies gained interest with distinguished international collaborators from Thomas Schaible and Andreas Heydweiller, Germany, Annelies de Klein, Netherlands, Mahmoud Elfiky, Egypt and China besides American researchers including Gudrun Aspelund, Julia Wynn and Rebecca Hernan. Preliminary results show the implications of the genes LONP1, ALYREF and MYRF in causing CDH.

Her studies on congenital heart disease have been published in the journals Nature and Science, and have shown that mutations in many different genes are a cause of congenital anomalies and can also be associated with neurodevelopmental disorders.

=== Cardiac disease ===
Chung has concentrated research efforts for cardiac disease on pulmonary arterial hypertension, inherited arrhythmias, and cardiomyopathies.

Chung has found four genes which cause pulmonary hypertension. Chung's current research is focused on identifying genes leading to pulmonary hypertension in children.

Chung's work researching cardiomyopathies describes metabolic causes, identify genetic modifiers of disease progression in children and infants with the hypertrophic cardiomyopathy and novel genes for infantile cardiomyopathy.

=== Spinal muscular atrophy ===
One of Chung's contributions within the field of genetics involves her role in the development of screenings and treatment for spinal muscular atrophy (SMA), especially in newborns. Chung led the team to develop a new screening process for newborns with spinal muscular atrophy, with a pilot study conducted with a population of infants in New York identifying and successfully treating one infant with SMA.

Chung has also conducted a natural history study to understand how spinal muscular atrophy progresses to provide a foundation for clinical trials.

=== Cancer ===
Chung focuses on a variety of cancer types, including breast cancers and pancreatic cancers, along with several rare forms of cancer and the clinical implementation of testing for cancers.

In her research focused on breast cancer, Chung works at the New York site of the Breast Cancer Family Registry, studying predominately heritable breast cancers. Genetic research in this area has been largely centered on variations of the BRCA1/BRCA2 mutations, as well as how genetics affect medical management decisions, health behaviors, and outcomes for patients.

Chung's research within the Columbia pancreas cancer genetic program discovered 27% of patients from the program had identifiable genetic causes for their pancreatic cancer.

=== Autism and neurodevelopmental disorders ===
Chung's research on neurodevelopment disorders at Columbia has resulted in the identification of novel genes associated with neurodevelopment disabilities and autism, including NR4A2, KAT6A, PPP2R5D, CSNK2A1, PHIP, CDC42BPB, TKT, DHPS, PRUNE, EMC1, AHDC1, POGZ, PURA, ARID2, DDX3X, SETD2, KIF1A, and SPATA5.

In April 2014, Chung spoke at TED2014, delivering a talk called "Autism – What we know (and what we don't know yet)." Chung discussed different ways in which genetics and autism interact, with some individuals with autism resulting from a single genetic factor, and other individuals with multifactorial autism, caused by multiple factors and genes. Additionally, Chung touched on the ameliorable effects of early detection of autism, along with new testing practices such as eye tracking test for babies which detects whether they have difficulty maintaining eye contact.

Chung also plays an instrumental role in spearheading research regarding a rare neurodegenerative disorder called KIF1A-Associated Neurological Disorder (KAND). The Chung Lab at Boston Children's Hospital houses the KAND Natural History Study and patient registry, which are key resources that aid in characterizing this rare and novel disease. On April 8, 2021, a paper was published by Lia Boyle, a KIF1A and KAND researcher in the Chung Lab, which characterizes KAND from the data collected through the Natural History Study and details the development of a KAND severity score. Additionally, Chung was featured in part one of a Ken Burns documentary called The Gene: An Intimate History, which focuses on the efforts of Luke Rosen and Sally Jackson, the founders of KIF1A.org, and researchers to find a treatment for KAND patients. Chung has also started a treatment program using an ASO to treat KAND and has a patient in an N of 1 trial to determine efficacy of this strategy.

=== Papers ===
Topic	Article Title
Congenital Heart Disease	Contribution of rare inherited and de novo variants in 2,871 congenital heart disease probands
Congenital Heart Disease	De novo mutations in congenital heart disease with neurodevelopmental and other congenital anomalies
Congenital Heart Disease	Increased Frequency of De novo Copy Number Variations in Congenital Heart Disease by Integrative Analysis of SNP Array and Exome Sequence Data
Congenital Heart Disease	De novo mutations in histone-modifying genes in congenital heart disease
Congenital Diaphragmatic Hernia	Increased burden of de novo predicted deleterious variants in complex congenital diaphragmatic hernia
Congenital Diaphragmatic Hernia	Whole exome sequencing identifies de novo mutations in GATA6 associated with congenital diaphragmatic hernia
Congenital Diaphragmatic Hernia	Variants in GATA4 are a rare cause of familial and sporadic congenital diaphragmatic hernia
Pulmonary Hypertension	Whole Exome Sequencing to Identify a Novel Gene (Caveolin-1) Associated With Human Pulmonary Arterial Hypertension
Spinal Muscular Atrophy	Pilot study of population-based newborn screening for spinal muscular atrophy in New York state
Spinal Muscular Atrophy	Spectrum of Neuropathophysiology in Spinal Muscular Atrophy Type I
Spinal Muscular Atrophy	The motor neuron response to SMN1 deficiency in spinal muscular atrophy
Autism and Neurogenetics	Autism Spectrum Disorder, Developmental and Psychiatric Features in 16p11.2 Duplication
Autism and Neurogenetics	De novo missense variants in PPP2R5D are associated with intellectual disability, macrocephaly, hypotonia, and autism
Autism and Neurogenetics	Mutations in TKT Are the Cause of a Syndrome Including Short Stature, Developmental Delay, and Congenital Heart Defects
Autism and Neurogenetics	Progress in Understanding and Treating SCN2A-Mediated Disorders
Autism and Neurogenetics	Quantifying the Effects of 16p11.2 Copy Number Variants on Brain Structure: A Multisite Genetic-First Study
Autism and Neurogenetics	De novo and inherited mutations in the X-linked gene CLCN4 are associated with syndromic intellectual disability and behavior and seizure disorders in males and females
Autism and Neurogenetics	Mutations in SPATA5 Are Associated with Microcephaly, Intellectual Disability, Seizures, and Hearing Loss
Autism and Neurogenetics	A Recurrent PDGFRB Mutation Causes Familial Infantile Myofibromatosis
	De novo mutations in CSNK2A1 are associated with neurodevelopmental abnormalities and dysmorphic features

== Recognition and awards ==
2021 American Association of Physicians

2020 National Academy of Medicine

2019 Rare Impact Award, National Organization of Rare Diseases

2018	New York Academy Medal for Distinguished Contributions in Biomedical Science
2017	Best Grand Rounds of the Year, Department of Pediatrics Columbia University
2015	American Society for Clinical Investigation
2014	Samberg Scholars in Children's Health
2014	Science Unbound Foundation's Best Paper in 2013, Gill, R; Cheung, YH; Shen, Y; Lanzano, P; Mirza, NM; Ten, S; Maclaren, NK; Motaghedi, R; Han, JC; Yanovski, JA; Leibel, RL; Chung, WK (2014). "Whole-exome sequencing identifies novel LEPR mutations in individuals with severe early onset obesity". Obesity (Silver Spring). 22 (2): 576–84. doi:10.1002/oby.20492. PMC 3791145. PMID 23616257..
2014	Dean's Distinguished Lecture in the Clinical Sciences
2012–2017	Castle Connolly's Top Doctors
2012	Member, Virginia Apgar Academy of Educators
2012	Inductee, Dade County Hall of Fame
2011	Distinguished Lecturer of the Year, Class of 2014, Columbia University
2010	Society of Pediatric Research, member
2010	Distinguished Lecturer of the Year, Class of 2013, Columbia University
2009	Presidential Award for Outstanding Teaching, Columbia University
2008	Medical Achievement Award, Bonei Olam
2008	Distinguished Lecturer, Class of 2011
2008	Glenda Garvey Teaching Academy, member
2005	American Medical Women's Association Mentor Award
2005	Best Translational Research, Columbia University Department of Pediatrics Assistant Professor Research Symposium
2001	Young Investigator Research Grant Award, American Academy of Pediatrics
1998	Dean's Research Award, Cornell University Medical College
1995	Dean's Research Award, Cornell University Medical College
1994	Louis Gibofsky Memorial Prize, Cornell University Medical College
1992	American Institute of Nutrition, Outstanding Student Research Award

== Personal life ==
She has two sons and spends most of her free time with her family, engaging in hiking, swimming, biking, solving puzzles, and going on scavenger hunts.
