= Adam Cohen (scientist) =

American scientist

Adam Ezra Cohen
- Born: New York City, New York, U.S.
- Education: Hunter College High School; Harvard University (AB); University of Cambridge (PhD); Stanford University (PhD)
- Scientific career
- Workplaces: Harvard University

Adam Ezra Cohen (born 1979) is a Professor of Chemistry, Chemical Biology, and Physics at Harvard University. He has received a Presidential Early Career Award for Scientists and Engineers and been selected by MIT Technology Review to the TR35 list of the world's top innovators under 35.

== Early life and education ==
Cohen was born in 1979 in New York City, New York. He is the son of Joel E. Cohen, Abby Rockefeller Mauze Professor of Populations at Rockefeller University in New York. He attended Hunter College Elementary School and Hunter College High School, a magnet school in New York City. He graduated Phi Beta Kappa and summa cum laude from Harvard College with an A.B. in chemistry and physics. He received a Ph.D. in theoretical physics from Cambridge University, where he was a Marshall Scholar, in 2003, and a Ph.D. in experimental physics from Stanford in 2006 with W.E. Moerner. Cohen completed a postdoctoral fellowship in chemistry at Stanford University in 2007.

== Career ==
=== Research ===
Cohen's research combines building physical tools to probe biological molecules, using nanofabrication, lasers, microfluidics, electronics and biochemistry to generate data. His current research includes single-molecule spectroscopy of microbial rhodopsins, the motion of bacteria in mucus, and new magneto-optical and chiroptical effects in organic molecules.

=== Inventions ===
In fifth grade, Cohen invented an "alarm" clock that woke him by playing a prerecorded message. In high school, Cohen created an eye-tracking apparatus for neuroscience experiments to benefit the disabled, an electrochemical hard disk drive, and a device that applies physics to allow his eye movements to maneuver his computer cursor. He also invented and built a nanoscale patterning technique using an electrochemical scanning tunneling microscope in his bedroom, which led to winning the Westinghouse Science Talent Search. His success in the Westinghouse competition led the mayor of New York City, Rudy Giuliani, to declare March 12, 1997 "Adam Ezra Cohen Day". For his dissertation at Stanford, Cohen invented the Anti-Brownian Electrokinetic trap, known as the ABEL trap, a machine capable of trapping and manipulating individual biomolecules in solution.

=== Awards ===
In high school, Cohen won the Westinghouse Science Talent Search, now the Regeneron Science Talent Search, for an invention that involved building a scanning tunneling microscope in his bedroom. He was also inducted into the National Gallery for America’s Young Inventors for the same invention in 1998. In 2007, he was named to the MIT Technology Review TR35 as one of the top 35 innovators in the world under the age of 35. In 2012, Popular Science named Cohen one of the "Brilliant 10: the 10 most promising young scientists working today". In 2010 he won a Presidential Early Career Award for Scientists and Engineers under the Department of Defense. and a NIH Director's New Innovator Award. In 2014, he won the inaugural national Blavatnik National Award for Young Scientists, awarded by the Blavatnik Family Foundation and the New York Academy of Sciences to "celebrate America’s most innovative and promising faculty-rank scientists and engineers".
