= Wellcome Book Prize =

Literary award

- Awarded for: topics of health and medicine in literature
- Sponsored by: Wellcome Trust
- Location: United Kingdom
- First award: 2009
- Website: Wellcome Book Prize

Wellcome Book Prize (2009–2019 — paused) is an annual British literary award sponsored by Wellcome Trust. In keeping with the vision and goals of Wellcome Trust, the Book Prize "celebrates the topics of health and medicine in literature", including fiction and non-fiction. The winner receives £30,000 making it "one of the most remunerative literature awards on offer."

The current prize for medicine in literature was inaugurated in 2009, but there was an older award with the same name. In 1998, Wellcome Trust began offering a prize that would enable a practicing life scientist to take time off and write a science book for the general reader. Applicants would submit a book outline and sample chapter, winners would then be obligated to write and publish the book. It appears the only winner was Michael J. Morgan for The Space Between Our Ears: How the Brain Represents Visual Space (2001), before the prize (for science writing) was discontinued.

From 2009 to 2012 it was called the Wellcome Trust Book Prize. In 2013 there was no award however there were changes to the prize including an increase in prize money from £25,000 to £30,000. The timetable of key dates is longlist in February, shortlist in March and winner in May.

In 2019, the prize announced that it had "decided to take a pause and reflect". After a period of reflection, the website simply died without explanation in early 2024.

== Winners and shortlisted nominees ==
Year	Winner	Work	Shortlisted nominees	Ref(s)
2019	Will Eaves	Murmur	Thomas Page McBee, Amateur: A true story about what makes a man; Sandeep Jauhar, Heart: A History; Arnold Thomas Fanning, Mind on Fire: A memoir of madness and recovery; Ottessa Moshfegh, My Year of Rest and Relaxation; Sarah Krasnostein, The Trauma Cleaner: One woman’s extraordinary life in death, decay and disaster	
2018	Mark O'Connell	To Be a Machine: Adventures Among Cyborgs, Utopians, Hackers, and the Futurists Solving the Modest Problem of Death	Ayọ̀bámi Adébáyọ̀, Stay With Me: A Novel; Lindsey Fitzharris, The Butchering Art: Joseph Lister's Quest to Transform the Grisly World of Victorian Medicine; Kathryn Mannix, With the End in Mind: Dying, Death, and Wisdom in an Age of Denial; Sigrid Rausing, Mayhem: A Memoir; Meredith Wadman, The Vaccine Race: Science, Politics, and the Human Costs of Defeating Disease	
2017	Maylis de Kerangal	Mend the Living (aka The Heart)	Ed Yong, I Contain Multitudes: The Microbes Within Us and a Grander View of Life; Siddhartha Mukherjee, The Gene: An Intimate History; David France, How to Survive a Plague: The Inside Story of How Citizens and Science Tamed AIDS; Sarah Moss, The Tidal Zone; Paul Kalanithi, When Breath Becomes Air	
2016	Suzanne O'Sullivan	It's All in Your Head: True Stories of Imaginary Illness	Amy Liptrot, The Outrun; Sarah Moss, Signs for Lost Children; Alex Pheby, Playthings; Cathy Rentzenbrink, The Last Act of Love: The Story of My Brother and His Sister; Steve Silberman, NeuroTribes: The Legacy of Autism and the Future of Neurodiversity	
2015	Marion Coutts	The Iceberg: A Memoir	Henry Marsh, Do No Harm: Stories of Life, Death and Brain Surgery; Sarah Moss, Bodies of Light; Alice Roberts, The Incredible Unlikeliness of Being: Evolution and the Making of Us; Scott Stossel, My Age of Anxiety: Fear, Hope, Dread, and the Search for Peace of Mind; Miriam Toews, All My Puny Sorrows	
2014	Andrew Solomon	Far from the Tree: Parents, Children, and the Search for Identity	Elizabeth Gilbert, The Signature of All Things; Emily Mayhew, Wounded: From Battlefield to Blighty; Adam Rutherford, Creation: The Origin of Life; Oliver Sacks, Hallucinations; Sarah Wise, Inconvenient People	
2013	No award			
2012	Thomas Wright	Circulation: William Harvey, a Man in Motion	Mohammed Hanif, Our Lady of Alice Bhatti; Peter James, Perfect People; Rose Tremain, Merivel: A Man of His Time; John M. Coates, The Hour Between Dog and Wolf: Risk-taking, Gut Feelings and the Biology of Boom and Bust; Nick Coleman, The Train in the Night: A Story of Music and Loss	
2011	Alice LaPlante	Turn of Mind	Philip Roth, Nemesis; Louisa Young, My Dear I Wanted to Tell You; Ann Patchett, State of Wonder; Siddhartha Mukherjee, The Emperor of All Maladies: A Biography of Cancer; Sarah Manguso, The Two Kinds of Decay	
2010	Rebecca Skloot	The Immortal Life of Henrietta Lacks	Gareth Williams, Angel of Death: The Story of Smallpox; Emma Henderson, Grace Williams Says it Loud; John Nichol, Medic: Saving Lives – from Dunkirk to Afghanistan; Lionel Shriver, So Much for That; Tim Parks, Teach Us to Sit Still: A Sceptic's Search for Health and Healing	
2009	Andrea Gillies	Keeper: Living with Nancy – A Journey into Alzheimer's	Abraham Verghese, Cutting for Stone; Brian Dillon, The Hypochondriacs: Nine Tormented Lives; Havi Carel, Illness (Art of Living); Allegra Goodman, Intuition; Jonny Steinberg, Sizwe's Test: A Young Man's Journey Through Africa's AIDS Epidemic, aka Three-Letter Plague	
