= Outrun =

Outrun may refer to:

- OutRun (series), a series of racing games by Sega
  - Out Run, the first game in the series (1986)
- The Outrun, a 2016 book, a memoir about Orkney
  - The Outrun (film), a 2024 drama film starring Saoirse Ronan, based on the book
- OutRun (album), a 2013 album by Kavinsky
- Synthwave, a music genre also called outrun
- OutRun, a Sega arcade system board
- Hit and Run (2012 film), an American comedy film also known by its pre-release title Outrun
- The out-run, the last part of a ski jumping hill

== See also ==
- Out Run, a 2016 documentary film directed by S. Leo Chiang and Johnny Symons
- Outrunner, an electric motor
