= List of Saoirse Ronan performances =

Roles of actress Saoirse Ronan

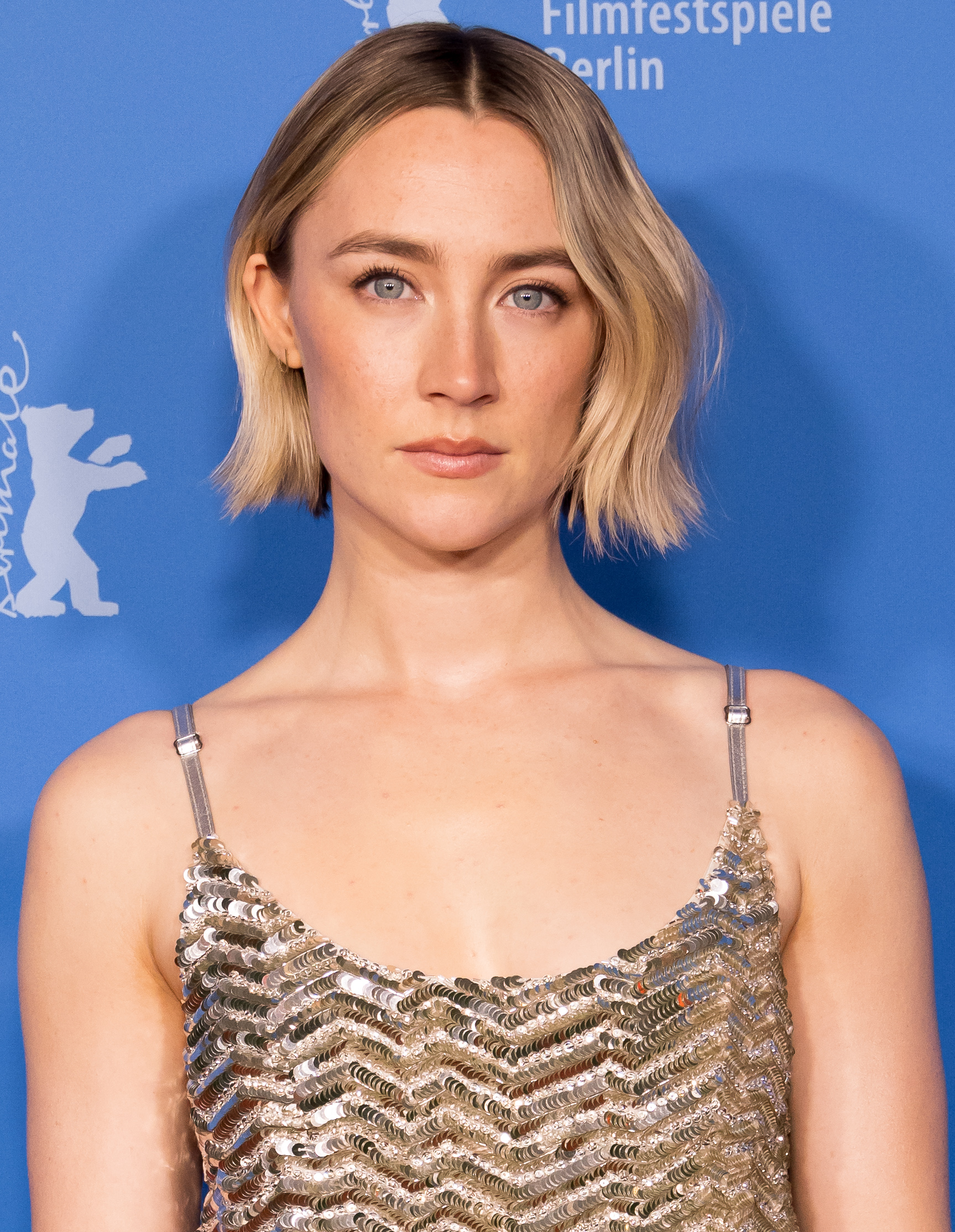
Ronan in 2024

American-born Irish actress Saoirse Ronan began her career as a child with the Irish medical drama series The Clinic in 2003. She made her film debut in 2007 with a supporting role in the romantic comedy I Could Never Be Your Woman, and had her breakout role in the same year with Joe Wright's period drama Atonement. Her performance as a precocious teenager in the latter earned her a nomination for the Academy Award for Best Supporting Actress. Two years later, she starred as a murdered girl seeking closure in Peter Jackson's drama The Lovely Bones, and in 2011, she reunited with Wright by playing the title role of an assassin in the action film Hanna.

Following a starring role in the poorly received science fiction film The Host (2013), Ronan featured in Wes Anderson's comedy-drama The Grand Budapest Hotel (2014). Her performance as a homesick Irishwoman in 1950s New York City in Brooklyn (2015) earned her a nomination for the Academy Award for Best Actress. In 2017, she had a voice role in the animated film Loving Vincent and played the titular teenager in Greta Gerwig's coming-of-age film Lady Bird. The latter won her the Golden Globe Award for Best Actress – Motion Picture Comedy or Musical in addition to another Academy Award nomination. Ronan made her Broadway debut by playing Abigail Williams in a 2016 revival of The Crucible. Alongside more period film roles, including in Mary Queen of Scots (2018), Ronan reteamed with Gerwig in Little Women (2019), which earned her another nomination for the Academy Award for Best Actress.

Ronan has since made her West End theatre debut as Lady Macbeth in a revival of The Tragedy of Macbeth in 2021 and taken on a comic role in See How They Run (2022). She expanded to film production with The Outrun (2024), in which she also starred as a recovering alcoholic.

== Film ==
Key
†	Denotes productions that have not yet been released

Year	Title	Role	Notes	Ref(s)
2007	I Could Never Be Your Woman	Izzie Mensforth		
2007	The Christmas Miracle of Jonathan Toomey	Celia Hardwick		
2007	Atonement	Briony Tallis (aged 13)		
2007	Death Defying Acts	Benji McGarvie		
2008	City of Ember	Lina Mayfleet		
2009	The Lovely Bones	Susie Salmon		
2010	Arrietty	Arrietty (voice)	English dub (U.K. version)	
2010	The Way Back	Irena Zielińska		
2011	Hanna	Hanna Heller		
2011	Violet & Daisy	Daisy		
2012	Byzantium	Eleanor Webb		
2013	The Host	Melanie Stryder / Wanderer "Wanda"		
2013	How I Live Now	Daisy		
2013	Justin and the Knights of Valour	Talia (voice)		
2014	The Grand Budapest Hotel	Agatha		
2014	Muppets Most Wanted	Ballerina	Cameo	
2014	Lost River	Rat		
2015	Stockholm, Pennsylvania	Leia Dargon		
2015	Weepah Way for Now	Emily (voice)		
2015	Brooklyn	Éilis Lacey		
2017	Loving Vincent	Marguerite Gachet (voice)		
2017	Lady Bird	Christine "Lady Bird" McPherson		
2017	On Chesil Beach	Florence Ponting		
2018	The Seagull	Nina Zarechnaya		
2018	Mary Queen of Scots	Mary, Queen of Scots		
2019	Little Women	Josephine "Jo" March		
2020	Ammonite	Charlotte Murchison		
2021	The French Dispatch	Junkie / Showgirl #1	Cameo	
2022	See How They Run	Constable Stalker		
2023	Foe	Henrietta / Hen		
2024	The Outrun	Rona	Also producer	
2024	Blitz	Rita Hanway		
2025	Bad Apples	Maria		
2026	Paper Plane	—N/a	Directorial debut; Short film	
2028	The Beatles – A Four-Film Cinematic Event	Linda McCartney	Filming	
TBA	The Three Incestuous Sisters	TBA	Post Production	

== Television ==
Year	Title	Role	Notes	Ref(s)
2003–2004	The Clinic	Rhiannon Geraghty	4 episodes	
2005	Proof	Orla Boland	4 episodes	
2014	Robot Chicken	Various	Voice; 2 episodes	
2017	Saturday Night Live	Herself (host)	Episode: "Saoirse Ronan/U2"	

== Theater ==
Year	Title	Role		Venue	Notes	Ref(s)
2016	The Crucible	Abigail Williams	Arthur Miller	Walter Kerr Theatre	Broadway	
2021	The Tragedy of Macbeth	Lady Macbeth	William Shakespeare	Almeida Theatre	London	

== Music video ==
Year	Title	Performer(s)	Album	Ref(s)
2013	"Garden's Heart"	Bat for Lashes	How I Live Now	
2016	"Cherry Wine"	Hozier	Hozier	
2017	"Galway Girl"	Ed Sheeran	÷	
2025	"Psycho Killer"	Talking Heads	Talking Heads: 77	

== Web ==
Year	Title	Role	Notes	Ref(s)
2008	Fred	Herself	Episode: "Fred is a Star in his Own Mind"	

== Discography ==
Year	Title	Album	Ref.
2015	"Tell Me"	Lost River	

== See also ==
- List of awards and nominations received by Saoirse Ronan
