= Stef Smith (playwright) =

Scottish playwright

Stef Smith is a Scottish playwright.

She was a finalist for the 2020 Susan Smith Blackburn Prize, for her play Nora: A Dolls House.

She adapted Amy Liptrot's memoir The Outrun for the stage, and it was performed in the 2024 Edinburgh International Festival.

== Early life and education ==
Smith is from a village near Stirling. She graduated from the School of Drama at Queen Margaret University in 2009 with a Bachelor of Arts (BA) with Honours in Drama and Theatre Arts.
