= The Outrun =

2016 nature and recovery memoir

- Author: Amy Liptrot
- Genre: Recovery memoir, nature writing
- Set in: Orkney
- Published: 2016
- Publisher: Canongate Books
- Media type: Paperback
- Awards: Wainwright Prize 2016; PEN/Ackerley Prize 2017
- ISBN: 978-1-78211-549-6

The Outrun is a 2016 memoir by the Scottish journalist and author Amy Liptrot. It is set in Orkney, her childhood home, where she returned to rehabilitate after becoming an alcoholic in London. The book combines nature writing with self-reflection. It won her the 2016 Wainwright Prize and the 2017 PEN/Ackerley Prize.

Critics in the United Kingdom and the United States have warmly welcomed the book, describing it as beautiful and moving, and classifying it variously as a travelogue, a work of nature writing, and a recovery memoir. The book has been adapted into a film, directed by Nora Fingscheidt, and produced by and starring Saoirse Ronan.

== Summary ==
The Outrun describes Amy Liptrot's experiences when she returns to live in Orkney, where she grew up on a farm with her schizophrenic and bipolar father and her evangelical Christian mother. She tells of her rehabilitation after ten unhappy years in London, during which she had become an alcoholic and drug user. She combines reflections and memories with immediate descriptions of the islands' wild nature, wind, geology, and wildlife. To her surprise, she gets a temporary job, on Orkney, mapping rare corncrakes for the Royal Society for the Protection of Birds (RSPB). Later, she spends a winter on the Orkney island of Papa Westray in the RSPB's house, which is normally only used in summer.

The book is illustrated with hand-drawn maps of the Orkney Islands and of the island of Papa Westray.

== Publication ==
The Outrun was first published in hardback by Canongate Books of Edinburgh in 2016. It was brought out in hardback in the United States by W. W. Norton & Company in 2017. It has been translated into several other languages, including Chinese, Dutch, French, German, and Spanish.

== Reception ==
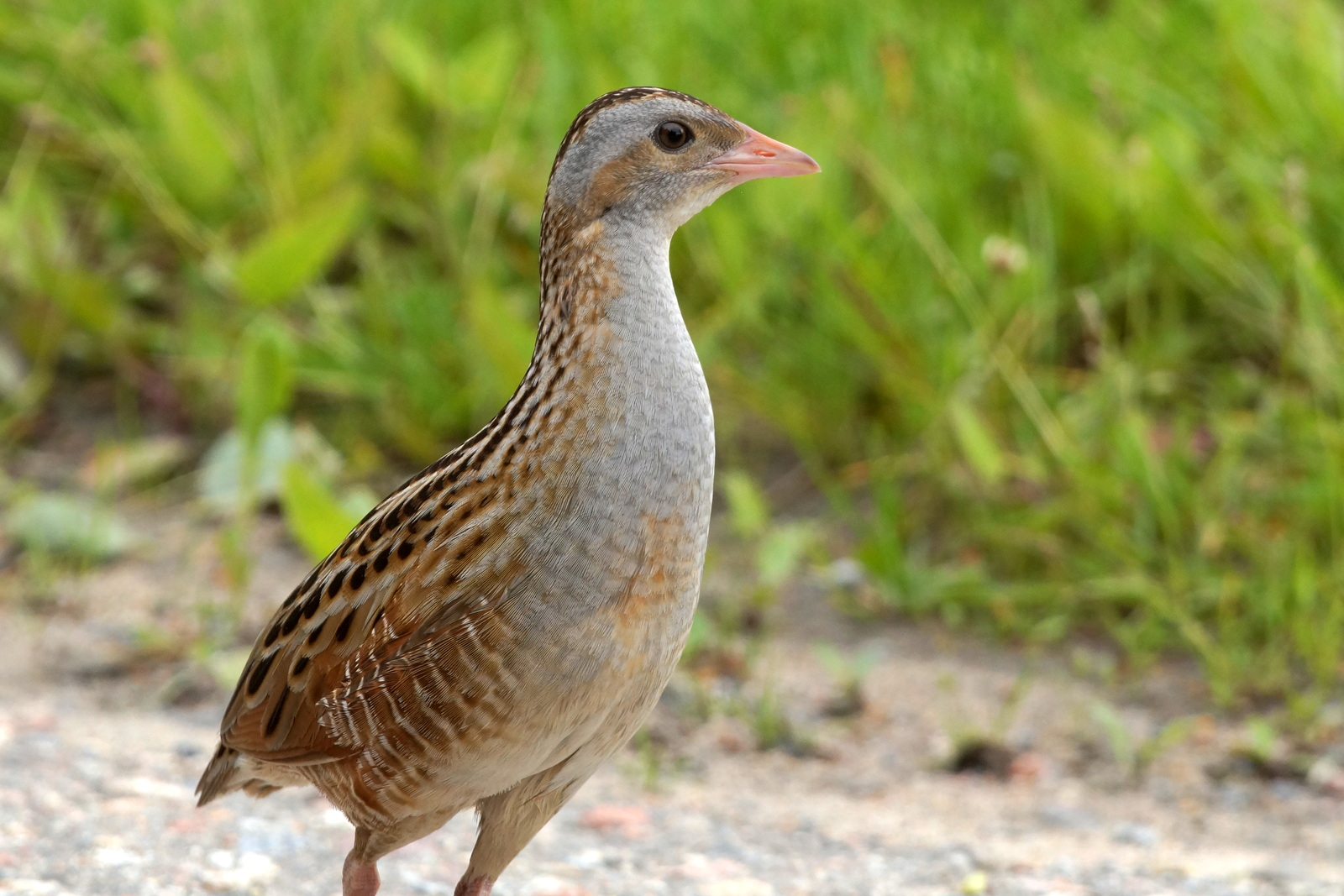
In a summer of recording for the RSPB, Liptrot saw the elusive corncrake just once, mapping it instead by its call.

=== Travelogue ===
Ian Thomson, reviewing the book in The Daily Telegraph, writes that The Outrun is "a glory to read. Matchless descriptions of landscape are combined with thoughtful reflections on Orcadian culture and local Norse legend. Domenica Ruta, in The New York Times, states that the nature writing shapes the book into a sort of "personal travelogue of the Orkney Islands, their numinous geology and mystical history, from the unique perspective of one who is both an outsider and a native."

=== Nature writing ===
In The Scotsman, Stuart Kelly writes that Liptrot interlaces "the spiralling chaos of her London life with the spiralling skies above Orkney." He describes the book as an instance of "New Nature Writing", citing works like Helen Macdonald's personal 2014 memoir H is for Hawk, which both told of personal loss and trauma, and described a close engagement with nature. Doug Johnstone in The Independent says that Liptrot's account "of the islands and their wildlife absolutely sizzles, a scintillating mix of clear-eyed insight and poetic heart."

=== Recovery memoir ===
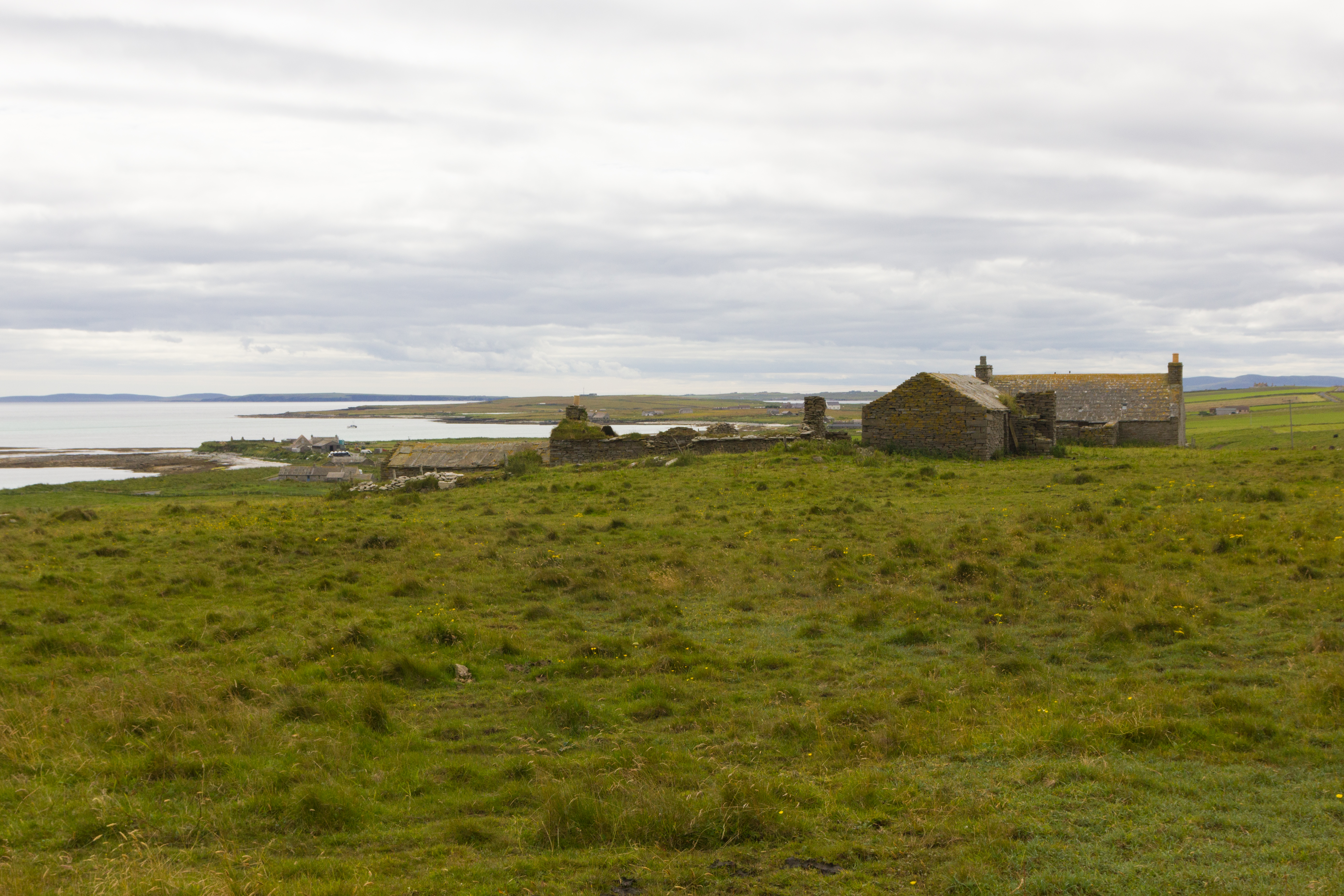
Papa Westray, where Liptrot spent a sober winter

Ruta, labelling The Outrun as a recovery memoir, describes the book as "full of lucid self-discovery and shimmering prose, ... more atmospheric than it is dramatic." She calls The Outrun a "gorgeous debut" and "a patiently wrought memoir". Johnstone calls it a beautiful book, offering a marvellous evocation of her life on Orkney, at once a "searing memoir" and "sublime nature writing". In his view, the book adds up to a moving philosophy of life; he finds the account of her "descent into drink ... raw and powerful ... without histrionics or melodrama". Thomson comments that Liptrot, with all her newfound, disabused integrity and hard-won sobriety, has written a minor classic of addiction literature." The Outrun was BBC Radio 4's Book of the Week from 18 January 2016. The BBC's Simon Richardson calls the book a moving personal memoir of alcoholism, likening it to Cheryl Strayed's 2012 Wild which described walking the long-distance Pacific Crest Trail in an attempt to shake out of her chaotic life.

Kelly, on the other hand, denies the book is a recovery memoir, on the grounds that it emphasises the difficulty of staying sober. He calls the book "bold-hearted and brave-minded", at once "terribly sad and awfully affecting."

== Awards ==
The book won the 2016 Wainwright Prize, then known as the Wainwright Golden Beer Prize, awarded for the best work of general outdoors, nature and UK-based travel writing. The chair of the judges, Fiona Reynolds, described it as "brave and searingly honest ... her spare, lyrical prose is both powerful and tender." It was the unanimous choice of the judges.

The book won the 2017 PEN/Ackerley Prize, given "for a literary autobiography of excellence." The chair of the judges, Peter Parker, described it as an "exhilarating and rigorously unsentimental memoir ... Liptrot writes with wonderful clarity and invention."

It was shortlisted for the 2016 Wellcome Book Prize which "celebrate[s] and champion[s] the best books illuminating some aspect of medicine, health or illness". The winning book was Suzanne O'Sullivan's It's All in Your Head.

== Adaptations ==
=== Film ===
In January 2022, it was announced that Nora Fingscheidt would direct a film adaptation of The Outrun. It was to be produced by and star Saoirse Ronan and written by Fingscheidt and Liptrot. Filming began in Orkney in 2022. The film premiered at the 2024 Sundance Film Festival. Ronan won a Silver Medallion at the Telluride Film Festival for her depiction.

=== Theatre ===
A theatre adaptation of The Outrun premiered in July 2024 as part of the Edinburgh International Festival. The show was written and adapted by Stef Smith, directed by Vicky Featherstone, and starred Isis Hainsworth, with original music composed by Luke Sutherland.

== Bibliography ==
- Liptrot, Amy (2016). The Outrun. Edinburgh, Scotland: Canongate Books. ISBN 978-1-78211-549-6. OCLC 1302144056.
