= Sandeep Jauhar =

Indian-American cardiologist and author

Sandeep Jauhar is an Indian-American cardiologist and author based in Long Island. He has written four memoirs on medicine, including the national bestseller Intern: A Doctor's Initiation. His 2018 book, Heart: A History was shortlisted for the Wellcome Book Prize in 2019.

Sandeep is a contributing writer for The New York Times since 2015 and his essays have been published in The Wall Street Journal, TIME, and Slate. He was a first responder on the day of the 9/11 attacks.

== Works ==
- Intern: A Doctor's Initiation (2007)
- Doctored: The Disillusionment of an American Physician (2014)
- Heart: A History (2018)
- My Father's Brain (2023)
