= Blitz (soundtrack) =

Blitz (Soundtrack from the Apple Original Film)

Film score by Hans Zimmer
- Released: 1 November 2024
- Recorded: 2024
- Genre: Film score
- Length: 35:47
- Label: Milan
- Producer: Hans Zimmer

Hans Zimmer chronology
Twilight of the Gods (Soundtrack from the Netflix Series) (2024)	Blitz (Soundtrack from the Apple Original Film) (2024)	Dragon Age: The Veilguard (Original Soundtrack) (2024)

Blitz (Soundtrack from the Apple Original Film) is the soundtrack to the 2024 film Blitz directed by Steve McQueen. The musical score is composed by Hans Zimmer, whose soundtrack featured 18 songs; it also included few original musical numbers scored by Nicholas Britell, who provided additional music. The album was released through Milan Records on 1 November 2024.

== Development ==
In July 2024, it was announced that Zimmer would score music for Blitz, collaborating with McQueen for the third time after 12 Years a Slave (2013) and Widows (2018). Though Zimmer had scored Pearl Harbor (2001) and Dunkirk (2017), both films set during World War II similar to Blitz, he opined that the story of Blitz personally connected with him, recalling that his mother sheltered as a German Jewish refugee in England during the war. McQueen gave Zimmer one direction about composing the score – that Zimmer would understand his mother better after watching this film. Zimmer said, "That's all he said. And I knew all the stories, and as I was working on the film. I started to feel her stories. So, he was absolutely correct."

McQueen's story moved Zimmer to compose a score that reflected the unrelenting chaos and brutality of the London blitz during WWII. He created a dissonant score that reflected the terror and confusion of how an adult and child would feel. Zimmer said he was "so committed to this atonality that it was very difficult to put pieces together." To achieve this, Zimmer thought of writing music that would be brutal and violent and feel uneasy towards the audience. He primarily used a treble recorder, which according to Zimmer was "one of the most tortuous instruments in the world." He recalled the instrument being played in his school on days where "everybody's out of tune and everybody's blowing really hard into them – and it's the sound of hell."

The score starts with an orchestra of children's recorders and gradually move towards a complex orchestration as the story progresses. Zimmer composed the score after returning from an orchestra tour where he had formed a close relationship with the performing band, adding "They've spent their whole life learning how to make their instruments sound beautiful. And it takes a certain amount of courage to go and then turn all that upside down and me saying, here are the notes, but what I want from you is I want them to be, like, you know, razors running down a piano wire." There were also some beautiful and hopeful moments throughout the score.

Nicholas Britell was brought for the film to compose original songs and produce additional music; he previously did the same for 12 Years a Slave. An original song "Winter Coat" was performed by Saoirse Ronan and Britell, which was recorded on 7 November 2024, at the Studio A located at Power Station at BerkleeNYC in New York City. The video of the performance was released through Deadline Hollywood on 27 November. The album was released through Milan Records on 1 November.

== Critical reception ==
Filmtracks.com wrote "The soundtrack altogether is the kind of souvenir-oriented experience that requires an admiration of the film to appreciate." Fionnuala Halligan of Screen International noted that Zimmer's score "occasionally threatens to overwhelm [...] but keeps a respectful and impactful distance." Monica Castillo of RogerEbert.com wrote "Hans Zimmer scores these events with discordant and jarring notes that sound vaguely electronic and metallic as if the sounds were ricocheting off trains and bombs." Justin Chang in his review for The New Yorker, summarized "Hans Zimmer’s dread-infused score at times evokes the drone of planes and the scream of sirens, but McQueen practically cues up an orchestra in jubilant response." Clarisse Loughrey of The Independent stated "Hans Zimmer’s thunderous, relentless score transforms itself into the machine of war, the crunch of metal against metal, or the whistle-whir of death falling from the sky." Leslie Felperin of The Hollywood Reporter called it as a "percussive, thrumming score". Rogan Graham of Little White Lies deciphered it as both "tense and dynamic".

== Track listing ==
No.	Title	Artist(s)	Length
1.	"September 1940"		1:29
2.	"Brighter Days" (Instrumental)	Nicholas Britell	1:11
3.	"Somewhere to Shelter"		0:57
4.	"No. 6 Platform"		2:22
5.	"Munitionettes"		1:20
6.	"Winter Coat"	Saoirse Ronan; Britell	3:24
7.	"An Adventure for Children"		2:00
8.	"Get Jumpin'"	Britell	2:46
9.	"It's Time"	Britell	2:37
10.	"Loitering Is Not Permitted"		1:51
11.	"Doing Rounds"		2:40
12.	"Allelujah (Hallelujah)"	Benjamin Clementine	1:31
13.	"Snake Hip Swings"	Britell	1:52
14.	"Oh Johnny, Oh Johnny, Oh!"	Celeste	2:50
15.	"Lost Property Not Lost Children"		1:38
16.	"Brighter Days"	Britell; Caitlin Drake; Nancy Sullivan; Florence Dobson	1:21
17.	"Never Let You Go Again"		3:58
Total length:			35:47

== Accolades ==
As Zimmer's score for Dune: Part Two deemed ineligible for the Best Original Score category at the 97th Academy Awards, due to the major themes being borrowed from the first film, the score for Blitz was instead considered as a contender for the possible category. It was shortlisted as one among the 146 other film scores on 2 December 2024.

Award/Festival	Date of ceremony	Category	Recipient(s)	Result	Ref.
Hollywood Music in Media Awards	20 November 2024	Best Original Song – Feature Film	"Winter Coat" – Nicholas Britell, Steve McQueen & Taura Stinson	Nominated	
Hollywood Music in Media Awards	20 November 2024	Original Score – Feature Film	Hans Zimmer	Nominated	
Hollywood Music in Media Awards	20 November 2024	Song – Onscreen Performance (TV Show/Limited Series)	"Winter Coat" – Saoirse Ronan	Nominated	
