= Alice LaPlante =

American author

- Born: Chicago
- Education: Stanford University
- Occupations: Journalist; writer
- Writing career
- Genres: Fiction, non-fiction
- Subjects: Crime, mystery
- Notable work: Turn of Mind (2011)
- Notable awards: Stegner Fellowship; Wellcome Book Prize (2011)
- Website: www.alicelaplante.com

Alice LaPlante is an American writer of fiction and non-fiction. She is a Jones Lecturer at Stanford University and professor of creative writing at San Francisco State University. She won the Wellcome Book Prize in 2011.

== Biography ==
LaPlante grew up in Chicago. She attended Stanford University, where she earned a degree in English literature.

== Career ==
LaPlante started writing as a journalist and later, an author. She wrote for several technology periodicals including IBM, HP, Oracle, Microsoft, and Sunsoft. She taught creative writing at Stanford University and San Francisco State University.

LaPlante's debut novel, Turn of Mind (2011), received critical acclaim and won the Wellcome Trust Book Prize in 2011. Her writing style and narrative techniques were praised for authenticity and emotional depth. She has also written short stories in literary journals such as Epoché and Southwest Review.. She wrote Method and Madness: The Making of a Story, a non-fiction book on the craft of writing.

In 2014 LaPlante published her novel, A Circle of Wives. In 2018, she published Half Moon Bay.

== Bibliography ==
- Turn of Mind. Grove Press. 2011. ISBN 9780802145901.
- A Circle of Wives. Atlantic Monthly Press. March 4, 2014. ISBN 978-0802122346.
- Coming of Age at the End of Days. Audible Studios. 2015. ISBN 978-1-5113-5772-2.
- Half Moon Bay. Scribner. 10 July 2018. ISBN 978-1-5011-9088-9.
