= Paper Plane (film) =

2026 short film by Saoirse Ronan

- Directed by: Saoirse Ronan
- Written by: Saoirse Ronan
- Produced by: Saoirse Ronan; Shirin Eren
- Starring: Martha Malone; Clare Dunne; Tim Creed
- Cinematography: Katie McCullough
- Edited by: Nathan Nugent
- Production companies: Keeper Pictures; Una Pictures
- Release date: 10 September 2026 (Venice International Film Festival)
- Running time: 15 minutes
- Countries: United Kingdom; Ireland
- Language: English

Paper Planes is a 2026 short film written and directed by Saoirse Ronan and starring Martha Malone, Clare Dunne, Tim Creed. A co-production between the United Kingdom and Ireland, it premiered at the 83rd Venice International Film Festival where it competed for the Orizzonti Award for Best Short Film. It later screened at the BFI London Film Festival, and the Austin Film Festival where it won the Best Narrative Short for the later.

== Summary ==
A defiant young girl stages a silent protest, refusing to return home until the disruptive presence of her father is gone. Her mother must decide whether to follow her or let her go.

== Cast ==
- Martha Malone as daughter
- Clare Dunne as mother
- Tim Creed as father

== Production ==
In an interview with The New York Times Ronan said earliest memories are of wrangling friends to act with her in the rural Irish village of Ardattin. She stated, “I was an only child, and I had a lot of time, so I kind of disappeared into a world of my dolls and would make up story lines for them and act them out. I really liked being a puppeteer, if you will". Ronan elaborated that she always wanted to direct even before deciding to go into acting. Ronan described the project as being "a love letter to a younger version of myself, and a younger version of my mother" and was inspired by her own experiences as a child. The project was shot in May of 2025. Ronan credited both Greta Gerwig, Eliza Scanlen and Jodie Foster's MasterClass with helping her write the film. She also cited directors she has worked with as inspirations such as Gerwig, Joe Wright, Peter Jackson and John Crowley.

== Reception ==
The film premiered at the 83rd Venice International Film Festival before playing at the BFI London Film Festival, the Austin Film Festival, the Encounters Film Festival, and the Cork International Film Festival. The film secured a qualifying run for consideration for the Academy Award and BAFTA Award for Best Live Action Short. Critic Alan Corr of RTÉ described the film as being "Almost devoid of dialogue" and having been "elegantly shot" with "deeply evocative" and "emotionally charged" performances. He ultimately declared it as being a "A poignant study of childhood innocence colliding with adult reality, haunting really is the operative word for Ronan’s quietly powerful debut film."

== Awards and nominations ==
| Organizations | Year | Category | Nominee | Result | Ref. |
|---|---|---|---|---|---|
| Austin Film Festival | 2026 | Best Narrative Short | Saoirse Ronan | Won | |
| Encounters International Film Festival | 2026 | Best of British Award - Live Action | Paper Plane | Won | |
| Venice International Film Festival | 2026 | Orizzonti Award for Best Short Film | Paper Plane | Nominated | |
