= Michael J. Morgan =

Michael John Morgan FRS (born 25 August 1942) is a professor at City, University of London. His area of research is the experimental psychology of vision, from neuroanatomy to perception and psychophysics. He was born in Cardiff, Wales, and was educated at Cowbridge Grammar School and Queens' College, Cambridge. He was elected a Fellow of the Royal Society in 2005. He is married to the biologist Linda Partridge FRS.

His 2001 book The Space Between Our Ears was the winner of the Wellcome Trust Book Prize before the prize was discontinued (and re-inaugurated in 2009 as a prize for medical writing). He is also the author of "Molyneux's Question" (Cambridge University Press), a book about the philosophy and psychology of recovery from early blindness.

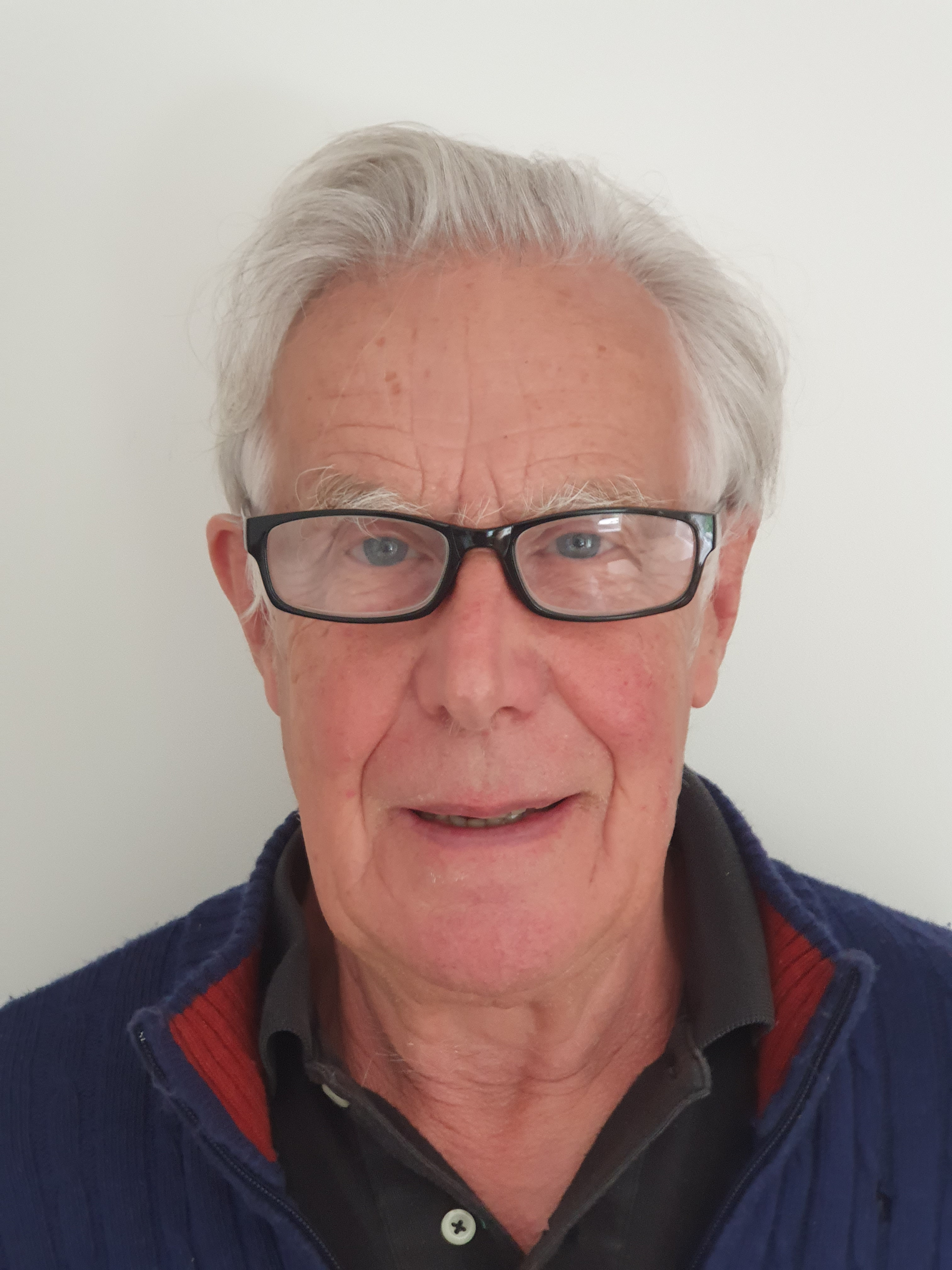
