= The Space Between Our Ears =

Book

The Space Between Our Ears: How the Brain Represents Visual Space is a 2001 non-fiction book by Michael J. Morgan, which explores the workings of vision.

== Reception ==
The Space Between Our Ears won the Wellcome Trust Book Prize for science writing.

In the Guardian, Steven Rose lauded Morgan's explanations of binocularity and depth perception, but faulted the inclusion of "irrelevant anecdotes, bad poems and even worse jokes". Perception described it as an "intelligent and erudite romp", and commended its appeal to scientists, noting that Morgan sets ideas which (to vision specialists) are of "cosy (...) familiarity" in a "rich context".
