= Saoirse Ronan =

Irish actress (born 1994)

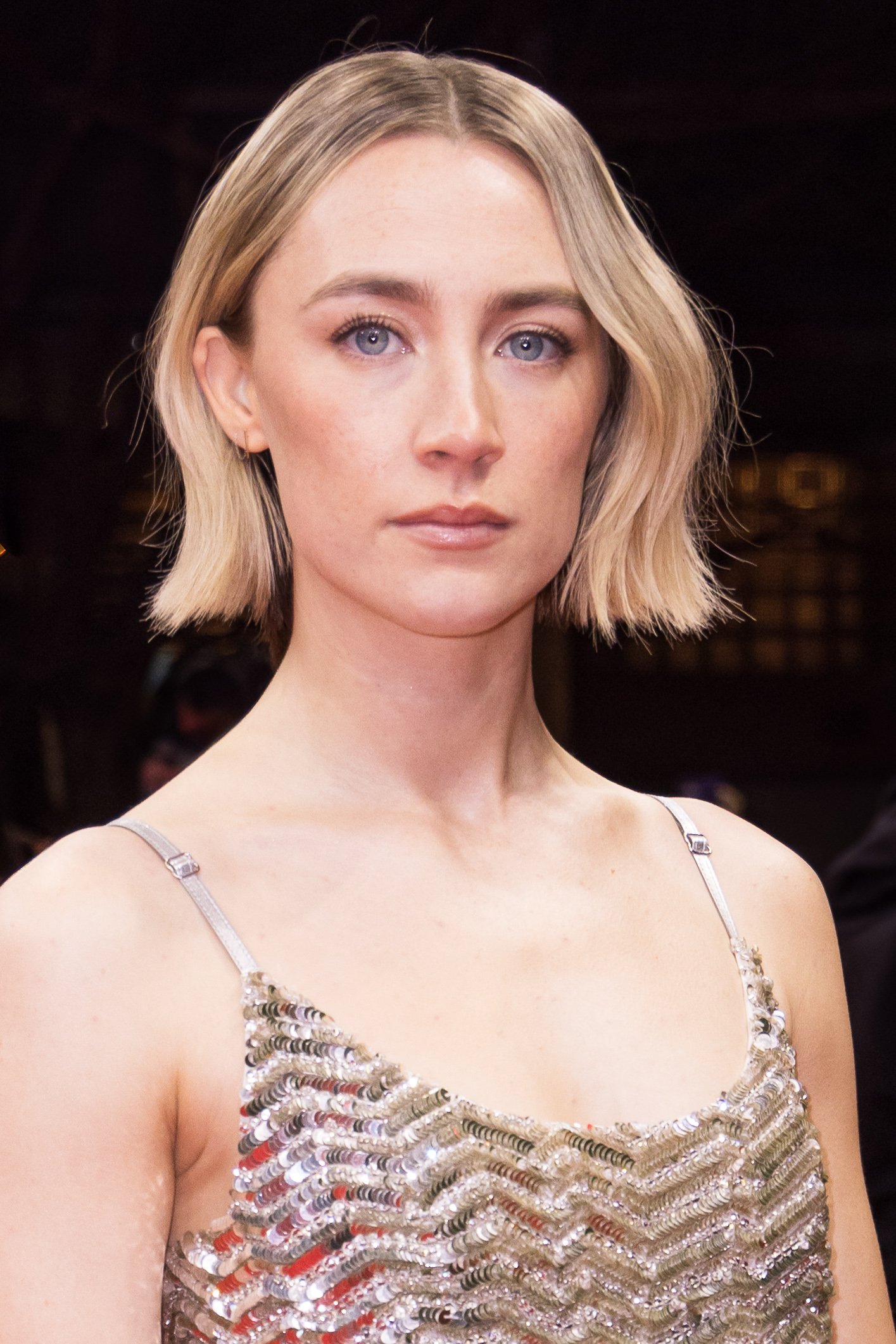
- Ronan in 2024
- Born: Saoirse Una Ronan; 12 April 1994 (age 32); New York City, U.S.
- Citizenship: Ireland; United States
- Occupation: Actress
- Years active: 2003–present
- Works: Full list
- Spouse: Jack Lowden (m. 2024)
- Children: 1
- Father: Paul Ronan
- Awards: Full list

Saoirse Una Ronan (Note: Pronunciation: /ˈsɜːrʃə ˈuːnə ˈroʊnən/, SUR-shə OO-nə ROH-nən. The name Saoirse means 'freedom' in the Irish language. The standard Irish pronunciation is [ˈsˠiːɾˠʃə]. However, Ronan pronounces her name /ˈsɜːrʃə/.) (born 12 April 1994) is an Irish actress. Primarily known for her work in period dramas, she has received various accolades, including a Golden Globe Award and a Scottish BAFTA, with nominations for four Academy Awards and seven British Academy Film Awards.

Ronan made her acting debut in 2003, when she was a child, on the Irish medical drama series The Clinic. Her breakthrough role was as a precocious teenager in the period drama film Atonement (2007), which earned her a nomination for the Academy Award for Best Supporting Actress. She was further nominated for three Academy Awards for Best Actress for playing an Irish immigrant in the romance Brooklyn (2015), a high school student in Greta Gerwig's coming-of-age film Lady Bird (2017) – which also won her a Golden Globe Award – and Jo March in Gerwig's period drama Little Women (2019). She also is known for her roles in the supernatural drama The Lovely Bones (2009), the action thriller Hanna (2011), the ensemble comedy The Grand Budapest Hotel (2014), the historical drama Mary Queen of Scots (2018), and the drama The Outrun (2024), the latter of which she also produced. She made her directorial debut with the short film Paper Plane (2026).

On stage, Ronan portrayed Abigail Williams in the 2016 Broadway revival of The Crucible and Lady Macbeth in the 2021 London revival of The Tragedy of Macbeth. In 2016, she was featured by Forbes in two of its 30 Under 30 lists, and in 2020 The New York Times ranked her tenth on its list of the greatest actors of the 21st century.

== Early life ==
Saoirse Una Ronan was born on 12 April 1994 in the Bronx borough of New York City, the only child of Irish parents Monica (née Brennan) and Paul Ronan, both from Dublin. Her mother worked as a nanny and had been a child actor. Her father worked in construction and in bars before training as an actor in New York. Her parents were undocumented immigrants who had left Ireland because of the recession of the 1980s; they struggled financially during their time in New York. Ronan holds both Irish and U.S. citizenship; she identifies as Irish and as a New Yorker.

Ronan's family moved back to Dublin when Ronan was three years old. Ronan was raised in Ardattin, County Carlow, where she attended Ardattin National School. She was later tutored at home. In her early teens, she lived again in Dublin with her parents, who settled in the seaside suburb of Howth. She has a close relationship with her parents, and lived with them until age 19. Ronan was raised Catholic, but questioned her faith during her childhood. She has cited Maggie Smith as her greatest acting influence.

== Career ==
=== Early work and breakthrough (2003–2009) ===
Ronan made her screen debut on Irish national broadcaster RTÉ, in the 2003 prime time medical drama The Clinic; she also appeared in the mini-serial Proof. Around the same time, she auditioned for the part of Luna Lovegood in the fantasy film Harry Potter and the Order of the Phoenix (2007), a role that went to fellow Irish actress Evanna Lynch. Ronan's first feature film was Amy Heckerling's romantic comedy I Could Never Be Your Woman (2007). It was theatrically released in a few international markets in 2007 and given a direct-to-video release in the United States in 2008, after it struggled to attract financing. In the film, Ronan portrays the daughter of Michelle Pfeiffer's character, with Paul Rudd co-starring as Pfeiffer's love interest. Joe Leydon of Variety called the film "desperately unfunny" but considered the interactions between Ronan and Pfeiffer to be among its highlights.

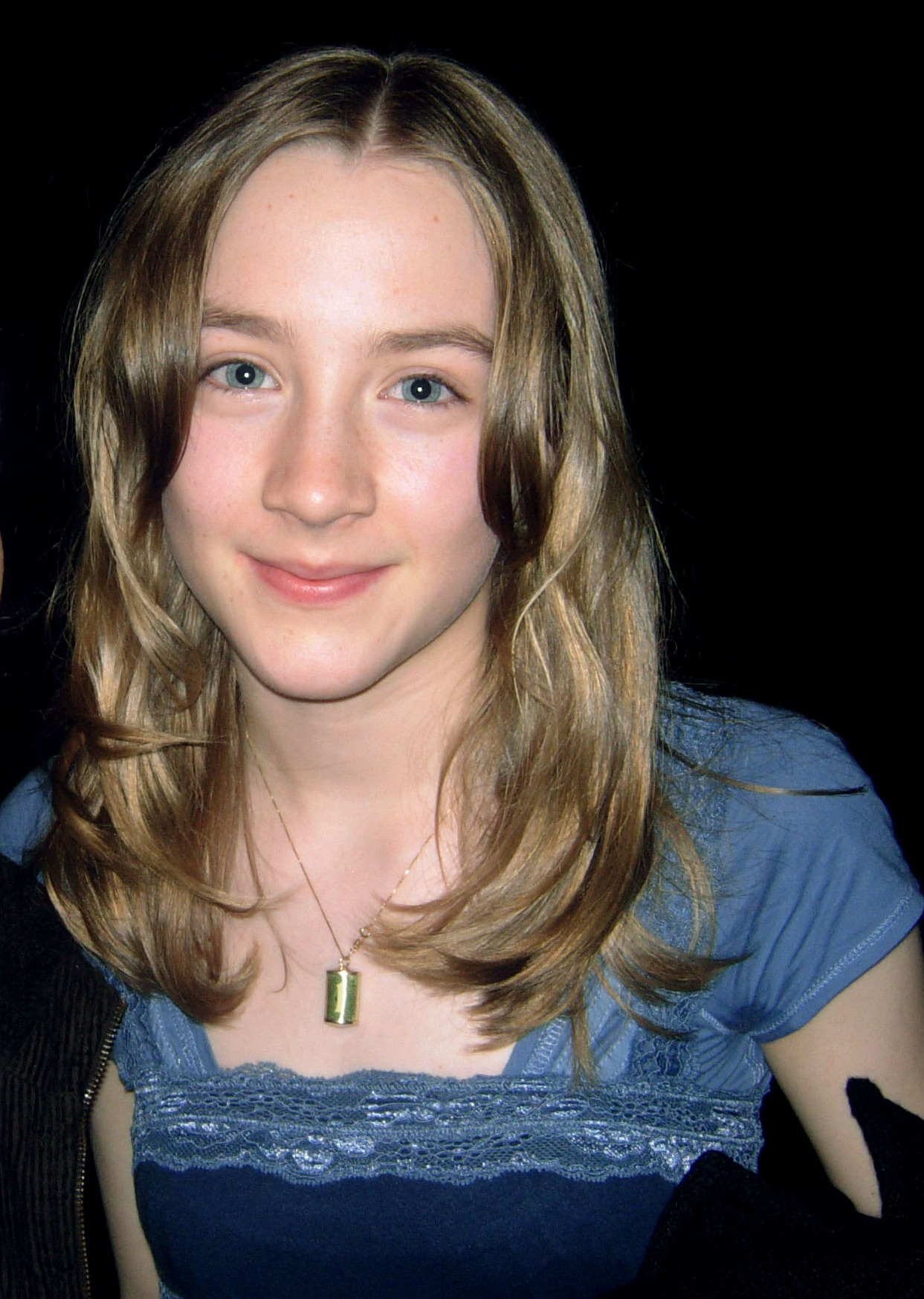
Ronan in 2008

At the age of 12, Ronan attended a casting call for Joe Wright's drama film Atonement (2007), which was based on Ian McEwan's 2001 novel Atonement. She auditioned for and won the part of Briony Tallis, a 13-year-old aspiring novelist, who accuses her sister's lover of a crime he did not commit. She performed alongside Keira Knightley and James McAvoy. The film earned overUS$129 million worldwide against a budget of $30 million. Ty Burr of The Boston Globe called Ronan "remarkable" and "eccentric", while Christopher Orr of The Atlantic described her as "a marvel, elegantly capturing the narcissism and self-doubt that adhere to precocity". Ronan was nominated for a BAFTA Award, a Golden Globe Award and an Academy Award for Best Supporting Actress, becoming the seventh youngest nominee in the latter category.

Ronan played the daughter of an impoverished psychic (Catherine Zeta-Jones) in the supernatural thriller Death Defying Acts (2007), and starred as Lina Mayfleet, a teenager who must save the inhabitants of an underground city in the fantasy film City of Ember (2008). Both films received mixed reviews from critics and failed at the box office. In a review for City of Ember, Stephen Holden of The New York Times wrote that Ronan's talents were wasted in the film.

In 2009, Ronan starred alongside Rachel Weisz, Mark Wahlberg, Susan Sarandon and Stanley Tucci in Peter Jackson's supernatural drama The Lovely Bones, an adaptation of the book of the same name by Alice Sebold. Ronan played 14-year-old Susie Salmon, who, after being raped and murdered, watches from the after-life as her family struggles to move on with their lives while she comes to terms with her quest for vengeance. Ronan and her family were originally hesitant for Ronan to accept the role because of its subject matter, but agreed after Jackson assured them that the film would not feature gratuitous scenes of rape and murder. Several sequences in the film relied on extensive special effects and much of Ronan's scenes were filmed in front of a blue screen. Reviewers were critical of the film's story and message, but Richard Corliss of Time believed that Ronan had successfully invested the gruesome tale with "immense gravity and grace". He later considered it to be the third best performance of the year. Sukhdev Sandhu of The Daily Telegraph considered Ronan to be the sole positive aspect of the production, writing that she "is simultaneously playful and solemn, youthful yet old beyond her years". The film was a box office disappointment, but earned Ronan a BAFTA Award for Best Actress in a Leading Role nomination.

=== Rise to prominence (2010–2014) ===
In Peter Weir's war drama The Way Back (2010), Ronan played the supporting part of Irena, a Polish orphan during World War II, who joins escaped Siberian convicts in a 4,000-mile (6,400 km) trek to India. It co-starred Jim Sturgess, Colin Farrell and Ed Harris, and was filmed on location in Bulgaria, India and Morocco. The following year, Ronan reunited with Joe Wright to play the title character in the action film Hanna, about a 15-year-old girl raised in the Arctic wilderness to be an assassin. The film co-starred Eric Bana and Cate Blanchett as Hanna's father and a villainous CIA agent, respectively. Ronan performed her own stunts and in preparation, she spent several months training in martial arts, stick fighting and knife fighting. Ronan's performance and the film's action sequences were praised by critics. In his review for Rolling Stone, Peter Travers termed the film "a surreal fable of blood and regret" and labelled Ronan an "acting sorceress". Hanna was a moderate commercial success. She voiced the lead role in the dubbed English version of Studio Ghibli's anime film Arrietty. At the age of 16, Ronan was invited to join the Academy of Motion Picture Arts and Sciences.

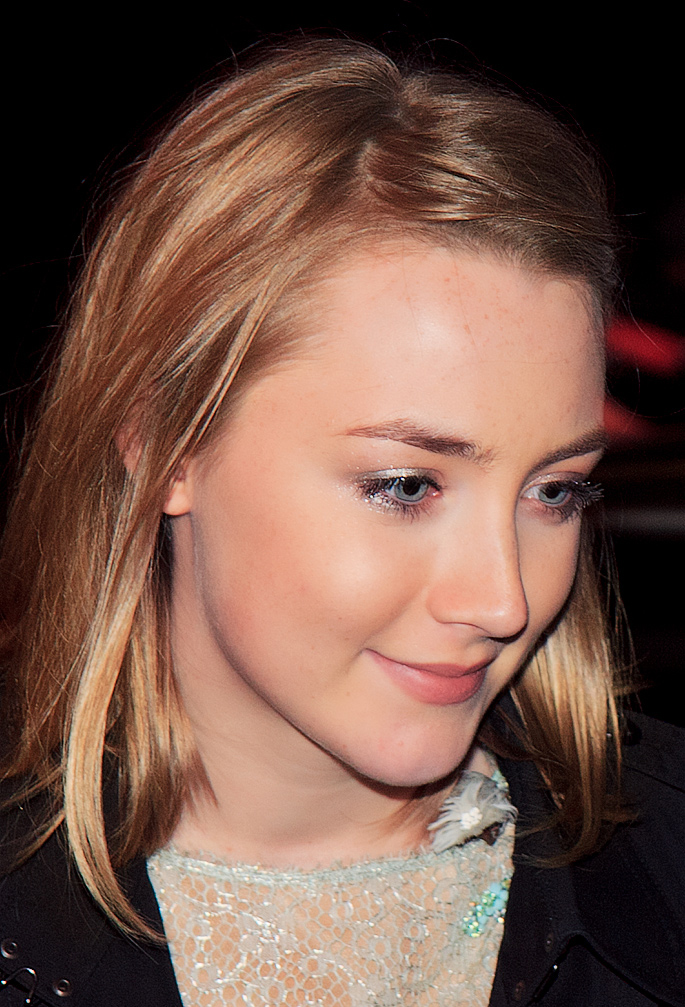
Ronan attending the premiere of Violet & Daisy at the 2011 Toronto International Film Festival

In 2011, Ronan took part in a promotion for the Irish Film Institute's Archive Preservation Fund, in which she was digitally edited into popular Irish films of the past, as well as documentary footage. Ronan and Alexis Bledel played the titular assassins in Geoffrey S. Fletcher's action film Violet & Daisy (2011). Eric Goldman of IGN compared the film unfavourably to the work of Quentin Tarantino and commented that Ronan's abilities had surpassed the material. Peter Jackson approached Ronan to play an elf in The Hobbit film series, but she withdrew from the project because of scheduling conflicts. She was instead drawn to Neil Jordan's horror film Byzantium (2012), as the "dark, gothic and twisted" project provided her an opportunity to play a more complex and mature character. The film starred Gemma Arterton and her as mother-and-daughter vampires. Writing for Radio Times, the critic Alan Jones found the film to be an "evocative fairy tale that uses vampires as a prism to comment on humanity" and considered both Arterton and Ronan to be "radiant" in it.

In a 2013 film adaptation of Stephenie Meyer's novel The Host, Ronan played the dual role of Melanie Stryder, a human rebel, and Wanderer, a parasitic alien. Critics disliked the film; Manohla Dargis took note of an "otherworldly aspect to [Ronan's] screen presence, partly because of her stillness and her own translucent eyes, which can suggest grave intensity or utter detachment". In Kevin Macdonald's drama How I Live Now, an adaptation of the novel of the same name by Meg Rosoff, Ronan played an American teenager sent to a remote farm in the United Kingdom during the outbreak of a fictional World War III. Olly Richards of Empire found Ronan to be in "typically watchable form" in it, but the film earned little at the box office. In her final film release of the year, Ronan voiced a barmaid named Talia in the critically panned animated film Justin and the Knights of Valour.

Ronan had two film releases in 2014 with widely diverse critical receptions – the well-reviewed comedy film The Grand Budapest Hotel from Wes Anderson and Ryan Gosling's panned directorial debut Lost River. In the former, an ensemble film headed by Ralph Fiennes and Tony Revolori, Ronan played the supporting part of the love interest to Revolori's character. It was the first project that she filmed without her parents accompanying her on set. The film earned over $174 million on a $25 million budget and was ranked by the BBC as one of the greatest films of the century. In the surrealistic fantasy film Lost River, Ronan played a mysterious young girl named Rat who owns a pet rat; Geoffrey Macnab of The Independent termed the film a "wildly self-indulgent affair" but praised Ronan's "tough but vulnerable" portrayal.

=== Established actress (2015–2021) ===
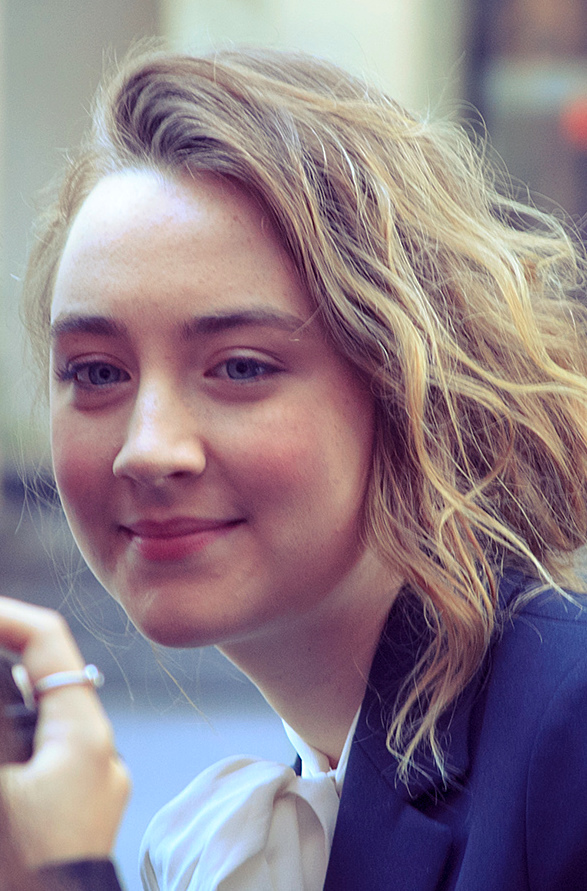
Ronan attending a screening of Brooklyn at the 2015 Toronto International Film Festival

After starring in Stockholm, Pennsylvania (2015), a psychological thriller about Stockholm syndrome, Ronan played the lead role of Eilis Lacey, a young homesick Irishwoman in 1950s New York City, in the drama Brooklyn. Directed by John Crowley, the film is based on the novel of the same name by Colm Tóibín. Ronan believed that several aspects of her character's development and journey mirrored her own. The critical consensus on the review aggregator Rotten Tomatoes describes Ronan's performance as "outstanding". Peter Bradshaw of The Guardian considered it to be a "heartfelt and absorbing film" and wrote that Ronan's "calm poise anchors almost every scene and every shot". Kenneth Turan of Los Angeles Times took note of the "overwhelming empathy she creates with the subtlest means, the remarkable way she's able to create achingly personal, intensely emotional sequences while seeming not to be doing very much at all." Ronan received nominations for the Academy Award for Best Actress and the Golden Globe Award for Best Actress in a Drama.

In 2016, Ronan moved to New York City to begin rehearsals for her debut appearance on Broadway, in a revival of Arthur Miller's play The Crucible. She took the role of Abigail Williams, a manipulative maid responsible for the death of 20 people accused of witchcraft. Based on the Salem witch trials, the play was directed by Ivo van Hove and ran for 125 performances. In preparation, she read Stacy Schiff's book The Witches: Salem, 1692, and collaborated closely with van Hove to empathise with her villainous character. Instead of relying on previous portrayals of Williams, Ronan played her as "more victim than victimizer". Writing for The Hollywood Reporter, David Rooney considered Ronan to be "icy and commanding" and Linda Winer of Newsday commented that she had played the part "with the duplicity of a malevolent surfer-girl".

Ronan next voiced Marguerite Gachet in the biographical animated drama Loving Vincent (2017), and starred alongside Billy Howle as troubled newlyweds on their honeymoon in a film adaptation of Ian McEwan's novel On Chesil Beach. In a mixed review of the latter film, Kate Erbland of IndieWire thought Ronan was underutilised in it and that her performance had been overshadowed by that of Howle. She starred in Greta Gerwig's coming-of-age film Lady Bird, in which she played the titular role of Christine "Lady Bird" McPherson, a high school senior who shares a tumultuous relationship with her mother (played by Laurie Metcalf). It ranks among the best-reviewed films of all time on the review-aggregator site Rotten Tomatoes. Deeming Ronan's performance one of the best of the year, A. O. Scott of The New York Times wrote, "Ronan navigates each swerve in Lady Bird's story with an uncanny combination of self-confidence and discovery. She is as spontaneous and unpredictable as an actual 17-year-old ... which suggests an altogether stupefying level of craft." She won the Golden Globe Award for Best Actress in a Comedy or Musical; and received Academy Award, BAFTA and SAG nominations for Best Actress.

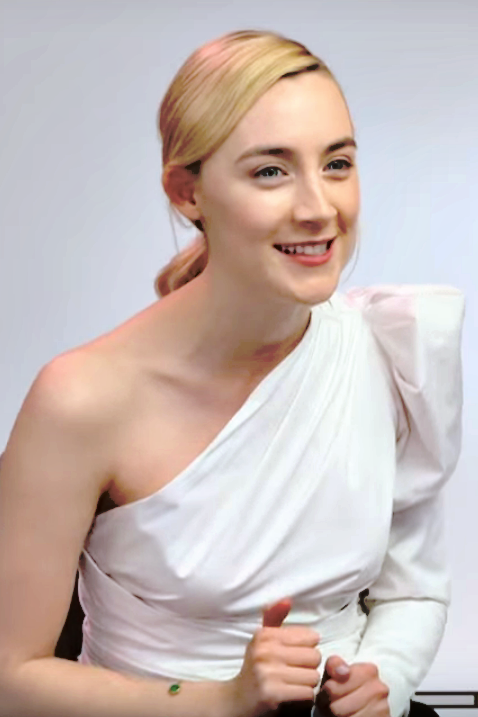
Ronan in 2018, promoting Lady Bird, for which she received her third Academy Award nomination

In 2017, Ronan hosted an episode of the NBC sketch comedy Saturday Night Live, in which one of her sketches was criticised for its stereotypical portrayal of Irish people, and featured in the music video for Ed Sheeran's song "Galway Girl". The following year, she starred in an adaptation of Anton Chekhov's play The Seagull, in which she played Nina, an aspiring actress. In a mixed review of the film, Michael O'Sullivan of The Washington Post praised Ronan's performance, writing that she "makes for an incandescent Nina, especially in her loopy final-act speech". She starred as Mary Stuart in the period drama Mary Queen of Scots, co-starring Margot Robbie as Elizabeth I of England. To maintain the distance between their characters, Ronan and Robbie did not interact with one another until filming their climactic encounter. Critic Todd McCarthy praised both actresses' performances and credited Ronan for "carr[ying] the film with fiercely individualistic spirit".

After becoming aware of a forthcoming film adaptation of Louisa May Alcott's novel Little Women, written and directed by Greta Gerwig, Ronan campaigned to play the lead role of Jo March, an aspiring author in the American Civil War era. In preparation, she read Marmee & Louisa, a biography about Alcott and her mother; the cast rehearsed the script for two weeks, and filming took place on location in Concord, Massachusetts. Little Women was released in 2019 to positive reviews. Richard Lawson of Vanity Fair took note of how well Ronan had portrayed her character "in all her conflicted loyalty, the struggle between her familial contentment and her yearning for something more". The film grossed over $218 million to emerge as her highest-grossing release. Once again, she received Oscar, BAFTA and Golden Globe nominations for Best Actress. This made Ronan—at 25 years and six months of age—the second youngest person to accrue four Oscar nominations, behind Jennifer Lawrence.

In 2020, Ronan portrayed the geologist Charlotte Murchison opposite Kate Winslet's Mary Anning in Francis Lee's Ammonite, a drama about a romantic relationship between the two women in the 1840s. The two actresses collaborated closely on the project, and they choreographed their own sex scenes. Steve Pond of TheWrap considered it to be "the most mature performance of [Ronan's] remarkable career". In the next year, Ronan had a small part in Wes Anderson's ensemble film The French Dispatch, about American journalists in France. She made her London stage debut at the Almeida Theatre, performing as Lady Macbeth in a revival of The Tragedy of Macbeth, opposite James McArdle. Ronan was intimidated by the experience of performing Shakespeare for the first time in her career, and drew inspiration from Kanye West and Kim Kardashian's marriage for portraying the relationship between Macbeth and Lady Macbeth. Alexandra Pollard of The Independent took note of Ronan's "rare skill to make Shakespeare’s beautiful but weighty words easy to understand".

=== Professional expansion (2022–present) ===
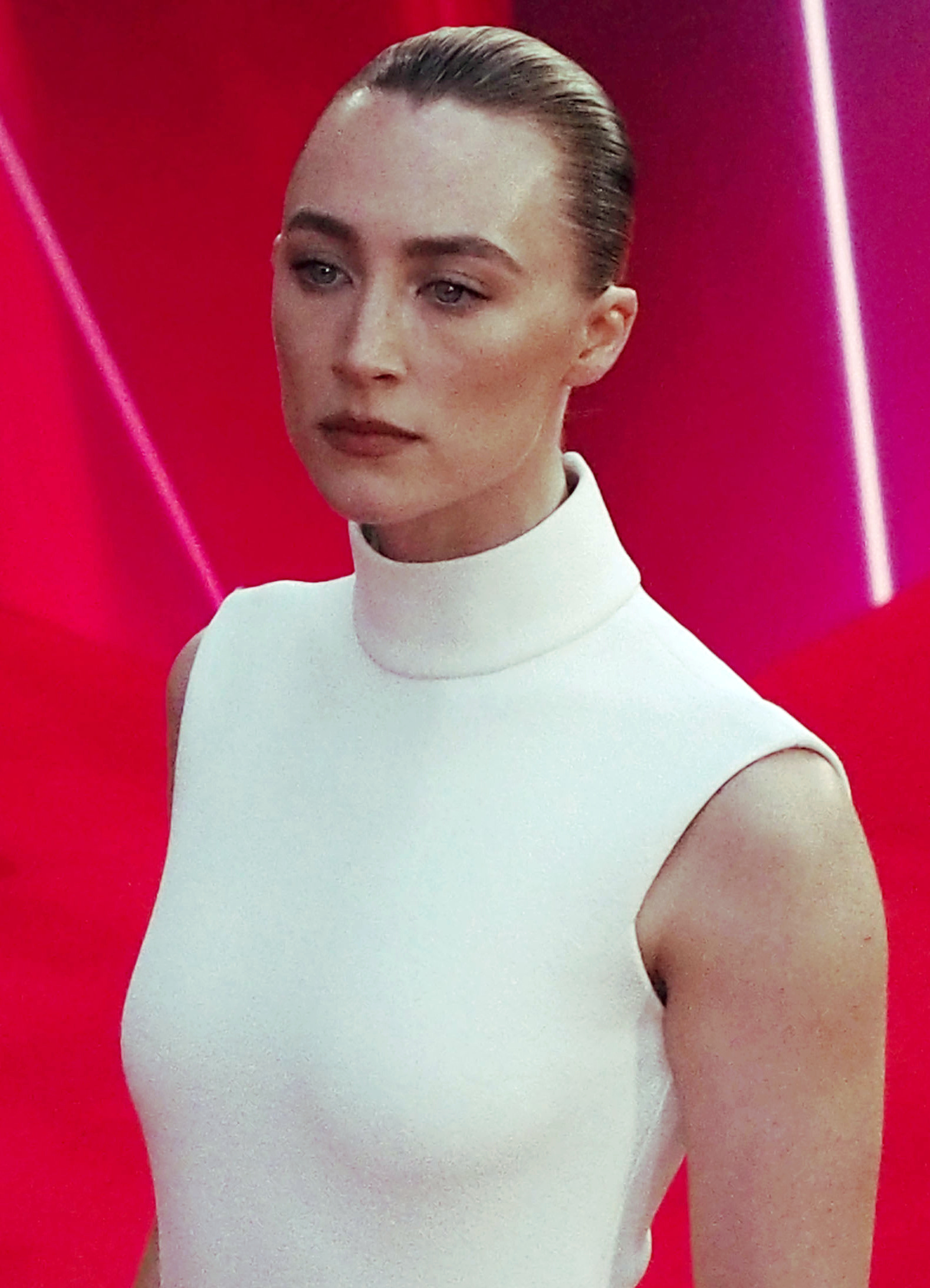
Ronan in 2024

Ronan and Sam Rockwell played police officers solving a murder in 1950s London in the comedy mystery film See How They Run (2022). Far Out's Calum Russell was pleased with her against-type "exercise in comedy acting". She then starred opposite Paul Mescal in a 2023 film adaptation of the science fiction novel Foe by Iain Reid, directed by Garth Davis. Receiving dire critical reviews, it emerged as her most poorly received film in many years.

Ronan, actor Jack Lowden, and producer Dominic Norris formed the production company Arcade Pictures. Under it, they produced The Outrun (2024), an adaptation of Amy Liptrot's memoir of the same name, directed by Nora Fingscheidt. Ronan also starred in the film as Rona (based on Liptrot); she found playing her character's struggle with alcoholism to be "very upsetting" as she had personally experienced the effects of addiction from those close to her. She also wrote several of her character's dialogues as Fingscheidt's script did not include specific ones. The Guardian's Adrian Horton found her performance "at once titanic and quiet, and utterly convincing even in the very difficult art of acting drunk". Lowden and Ronan stepped down from Arcade Pictures soon after the film's premiere at the 2024 Sundance Film Festival. Ronan next starred as a distraught mother searching for her missing son amidst the Blitz in Steve McQueen's drama film Blitz. Initially not keen to work in a war film, she was drawn to the project because of its focus on the mother-son relationship. She also sang a few songs for its soundtrack. For The Outrun, Ronan received BAFTA nominations for Best Actress and Outstanding British Film (as producer).

On June 5, 2025, it was announced that Ronan would star in the Talking Heads's classic "Psycho Killer" video for the band's 50th anniversary. She next led the dark comedy thriller Bad Apples, playing a primary school teacher disrupted by an unruly student. According to Bad Apple's director Jonatan Etzler, Ronan was the only actor he had in mind for the role and identified her as "sympathetic as a person" and "one of the greatest actors of her generation". After having been sent for, Ronan quickly responded within a week with Etzler saying that she was "keen on doing it because it’s not her usual character to play. She’s been playing a lot of good-hearted people. I think she was very keen on playing an unsympathetic character." On October 31, 2025 it was announced that Ronan will be portraying Linda McCartney in the upcoming Beatles biographical film quadrilogy directed by Sam Mendes, to be released in April 2028. In 2026, she made her directorial debut with the short film Paper Plane which debuted at the 83rd Venice International Film Festival before winning Best Narrative Short at the Austin Film Festival.

== Personal life ==
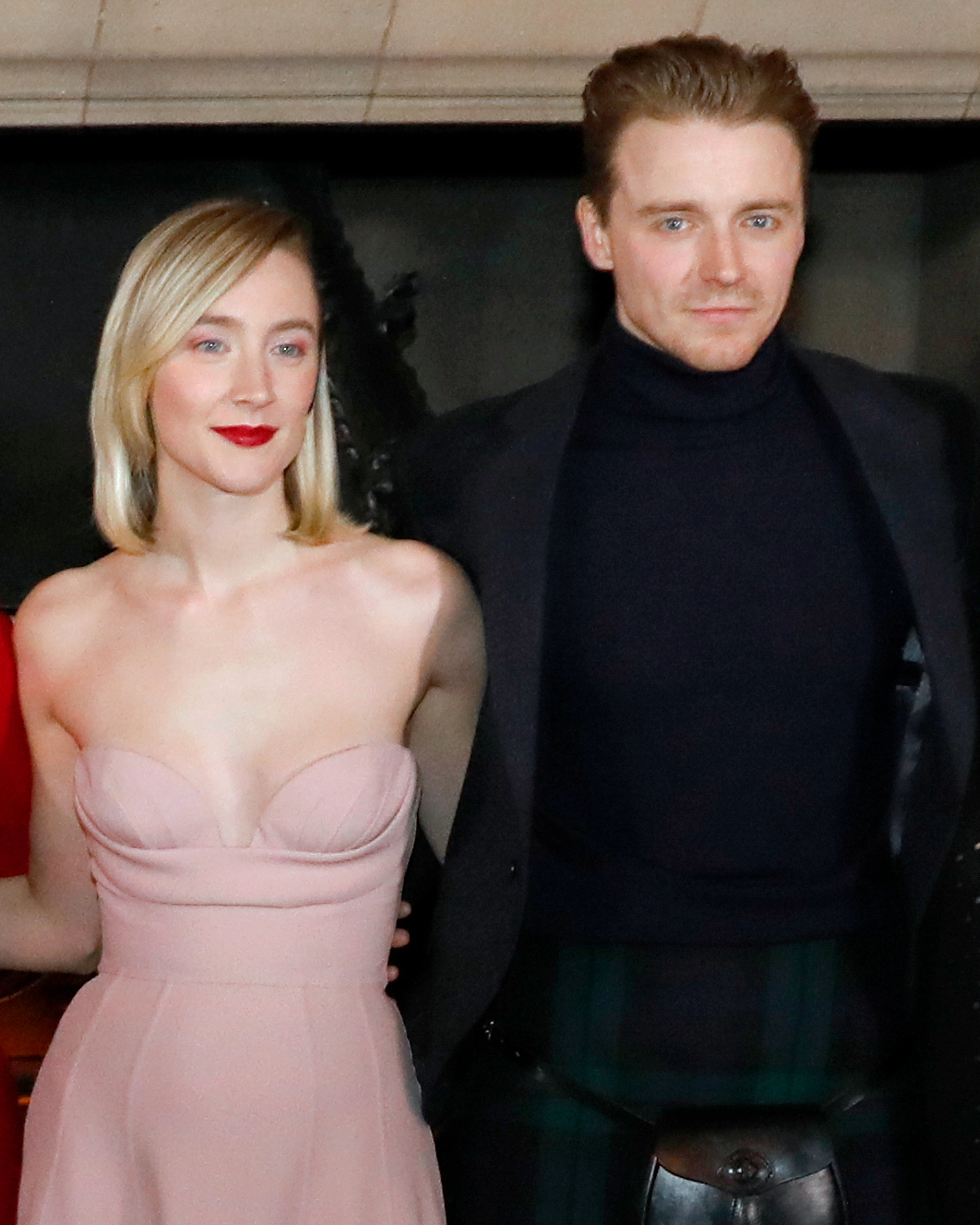
Ronan and Jack Lowden in 2019

In 2018, Ronan began a relationship with Scottish actor Jack Lowden, her co-star in Mary Queen of Scots. In 2024, the Irish Independent reported that the couple had married in a secret ceremony in Edinburgh. In 2025, they had their first child. Known for guarding her private life, Ronan avoids social media because she finds it stressful.

Ronan has been an ambassador for the Irish Society for the Prevention of Cruelty to Children. She has been associated with the anti-homelessness organisation Home Sweet Home, and supported its 2016 illegal takeover of a Dublin office building to house 31 homeless families. The same year, she was featured in a music video for Hozier's song "Cherry Wine" as part of a campaign to raise awareness about domestic violence. She voted in favour of gay marriage during the 2015 Irish constitutional referendums, and supported the legalisation of abortion during the 2018 referendum campaign.

== Public image ==
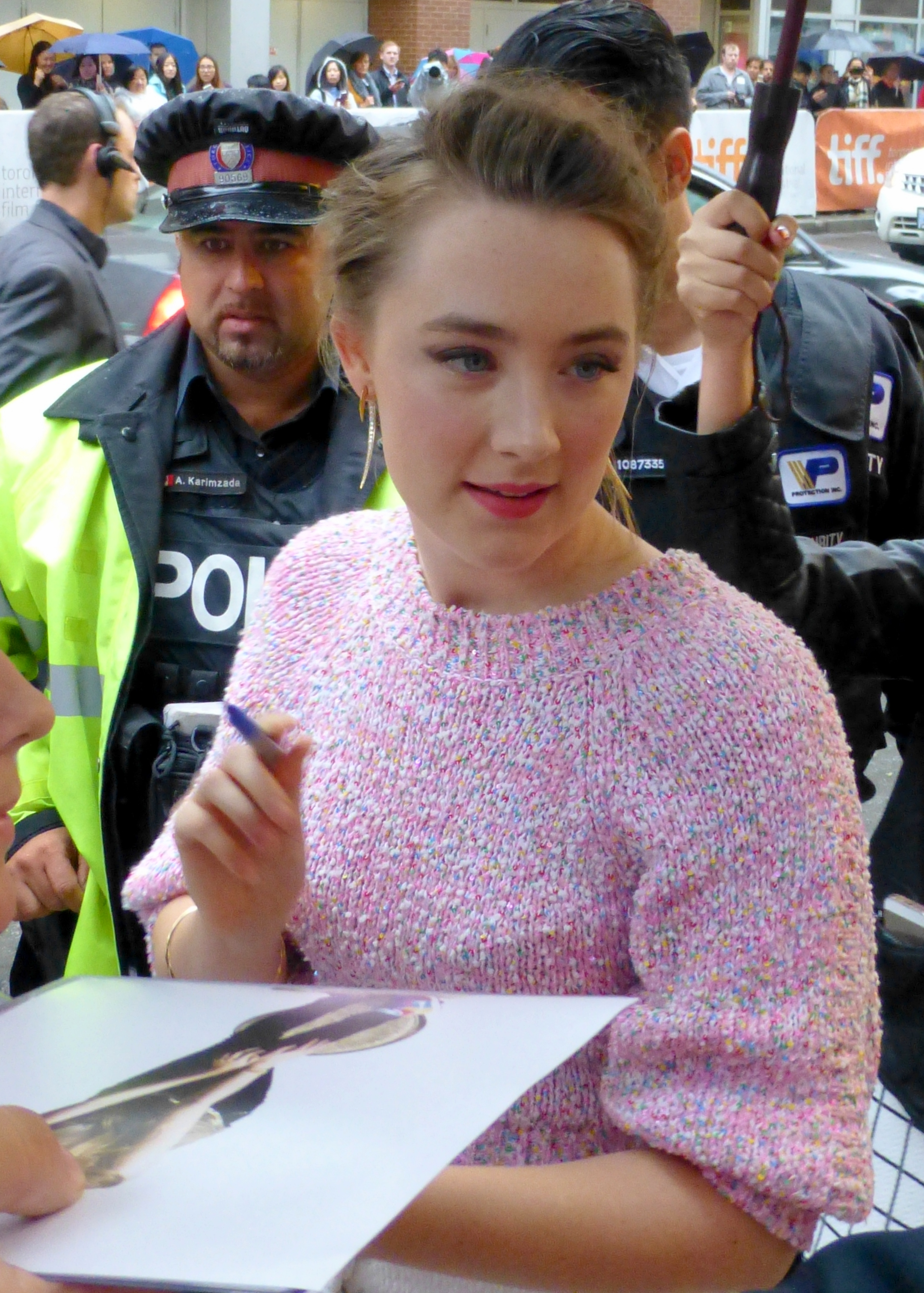
Ronan in 2015

Erica Wagner of Harper's Bazaar has described Ronan's off-screen persona as "lively, funny, warm", while Vanessa Thorpe of The Guardian found her "unpretentious". Several publications have called Ronan one of the finest actors of her generation. Alissa Wilkinson of The New York Times said she often plays complex female characters in carefully selected projects. In his review of Lady Bird in 2017, New York Times critic A. O. Scott called Ronan "one of the most formidable actors in movies today". In 2020, the newspaper ranked her tenth on its list of the greatest actors of the 21st century. The same year, she was placed sixth on The Irish Times' list of Ireland's greatest film actors of all time. Variety's Clayton Davis reported that Ronan's career and accolades are comparable to those of Kate Winslet and Cate Blanchett.

In 2016, Ronan was featured by Forbes on two of its 30 Under 30 lists and on Time's Next Generation Leaders list. In 2018, she was featured in Maxim's Hot 100 list and was named among the best American actors under 30 by IndieWire. She was ranked one of the best-dressed women in 2018 by the fashion website Net-a-Porter. Also that year, Calvin Klein appointed her and Lupita Nyong'o as the faces of Raf Simons's "Women", his first fragrance for the company. To support sustainable fashion, she wore a dress to the 2020 Oscars made from the surplus fabric of the dress she wore to the BAFTAs.

== Acting credits and accolades ==
Ronan has been recognised by the Academy of Motion Picture Arts and Sciences for the following performances:

- 80th Academy Awards: Best Supporting Actress, nomination, for Atonement (2007)
- 88th Academy Awards: Best Actress, nomination, for Brooklyn (2015)
- 90th Academy Awards: Best Actress, nomination, for Lady Bird (2017)
- 92nd Academy Awards: Best Actress, nomination, for Little Women (2019)

In 2020, aged 25 years and six months, Ronan became the second-youngest person to accrue four Academy Award nominations, after Jennifer Lawrence. She has received six British Academy Film Award nominations, four Screen Actors Guild Award nominations, and four Golden Globe Award nominations, winning Best Actress in a Motion Picture Musical or Comedy for Lady Bird.

== See also ==
- List of Academy Award winners and nominees from Ireland
- List of oldest and youngest Academy Award winners and nominees
- List of actors with two or more Academy Award nominations in acting categories
- List of Golden Globe winners
