= Cathy Rentzenbrink =

English writer

- Born: Cornwall, England
- Writing career
- Notable work: The Last Act of Love (2015)

Cathy Rentzenbrink is a British memoirist, the author of the Sunday Times bestseller The Last Act of Love (2015), which was also shortlisted for the Wellcome Book Prize.

== Biography ==
Cathy Rentzenbrink was born in Cornwall and moved to Yorkshire when her father sought work at Selby Coalfield. For several years she helped care for her brother Matty. He had sustained a severe brain injury shortly after his GCSEs. Following his death she took up residence in London. For the next 10-years she worked in Waterstones’ bookshops. For Quick Reads, she helped individuals to read and write basics. She was an editor of The Bookseller before returning to Falmouth, Cornwall, in 2017. Her books include the Sunday Times bestseller and Wellcome Book Prize shortlisted The Last Act of Love (2015), and A Manual for Heartache (2017).

== Bibliography ==
- The Last Act of Love: The Story of My Brother and His Sister. London: Pan Macmillan. 2015. ISBN 978-1-4472-8639-4.
- A Manual for Heartache. Pan Macmillan. 2017. ISBN 978-1-5098-2444-1.
- Hometown Tales: Yorkshire. Orion. 2018. ISBN 978-1-4746-0613-4. (co-authored with Victoria Hennison)
- Dear Reader: The moving and joyous story of how books can change your life, packed with recommendations from one reader to another. Pan Macmillan. 2020. ISBN 978-1-5098-9153-5.
- Write It All Down: How to Put Your Life on the Page. Pan Macmillan. 2022. ISBN 978-1-5290-5623-5.
