= The Last Act of Love =

2015 memoir by Cathy Rentzenbrink

- Author: Cathy Rentzenbrink
- Language: English
- Subject: Memoir
- Published: 2015
- Publisher: Picador
- Publication place: UK
- ISBN: 978-1-4472-8639-4

The Last Act of Love is a memoir by British memoirist Cathy Rentzenbrink, published in 2015 by Picador.

It tells the story of the author's brother's accident and resulting brain injury. He subsequently lay in a state of severe neurological impairment for the next eight years until the decision ("the last act of love") to turn off the assisted nutrition and hydration was made.

It became a Sunday Times bestseller and was shortlisted for the Wellcome Book Prize.
