= John M. Coates =

John Coates
- Education: University of Cambridge
- Scientific career
- Workplaces: University of Cambridge
- Website: http://johnmcoates.wordpress.com/

John Coates is a neuroscientist and applied physiologist working on the biology of risk taking. He was until 2016 research fellow in neuroscience and finance at the University of Cambridge. Before that he was a trader on Wall Street, working for Goldman Sachs, Merrill Lynch and running a desk at Deutsche Bank. He developed novel techniques for analyzing and trading tail events such financial crises.

Coates then retrained in physiology and neuroscience and began researching the biology of risk taking and stress. Monitoring in real time the cardiovascular and endocrine systems of traders, he found that the state of their physiology (rather than their psychology) is the single largest predictor of their risk taking and performance.

In 2012, Coates published the best-selling book The Hour Between Dog and Wolf: how risk-taking transforms us, body and mind.

== Awards and honors ==
- 2012 Wellcome Trust Book Prize, shortlist, The Hour Between Dog and Wolf
- 2012 Financial Times and Goldman Sachs Business Book of the Year Award, shortlist, The Hour Between Dog and Wolf
- 2012 Named by Foreign Policy magazine on its list of top global thinkers.
