= Ardattin =

Village in County Carlow, Ireland

Coordinates: 52.754°N 6.707°W

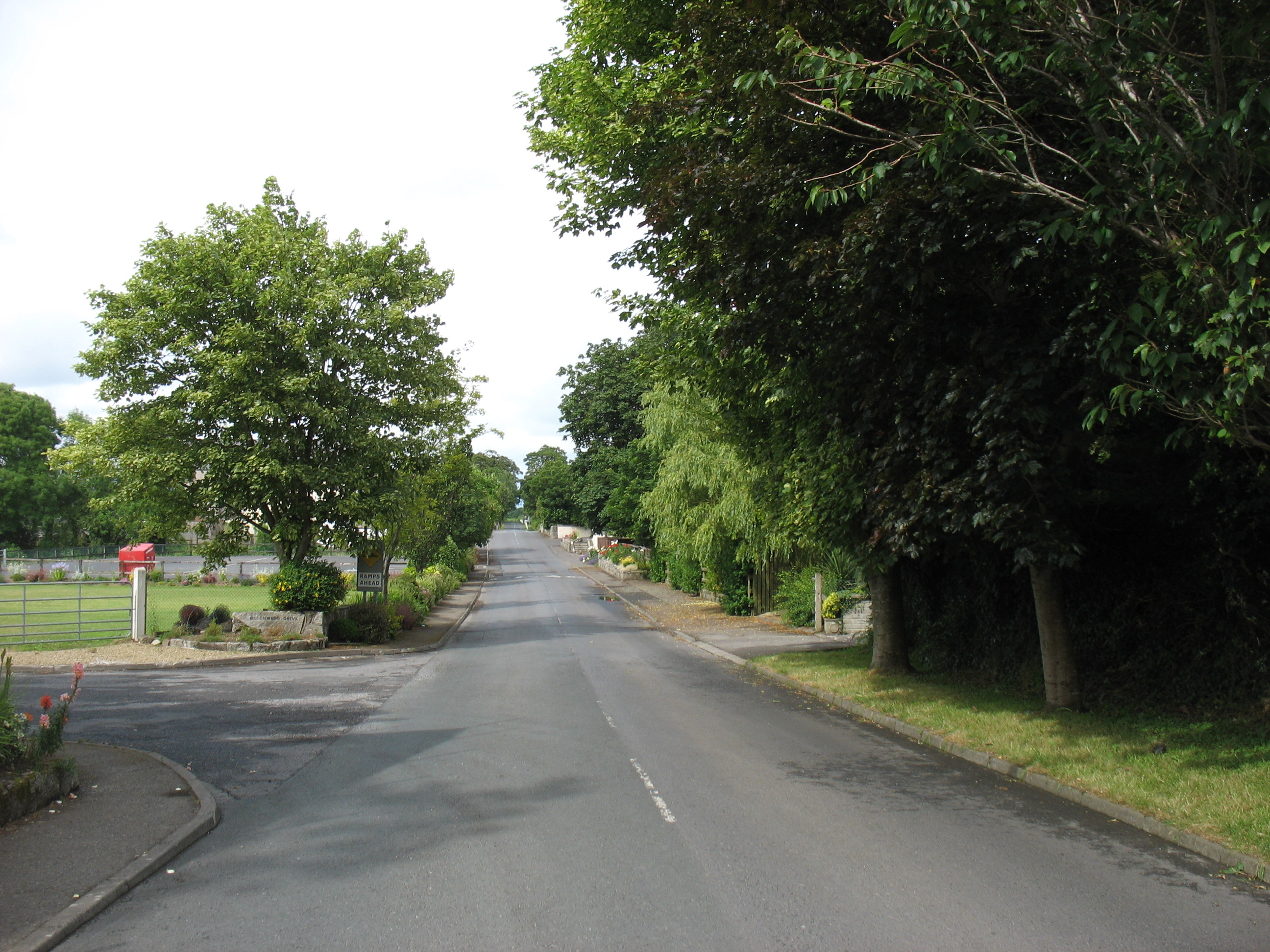
Road through Ardattin village

Ardattin (Irish: Ard Aitinn, meaning 'high gorse') is a village and townland in County Carlow, Ireland, 6 km south of Tullow. It lies in the civil parish of Ardoyne in the historical barony of Forth. As of the 2011 census, the townland had a population of 34 people.

The local Roman Catholic church, the Church of the Immaculate Conception, was built in 1954 and is in Tullow Parish of the Diocese of Kildare and Leighlin. There is a pub in the area.

== People ==
- Pierce Butler, Founding Father of the United States
- Saoirse Ronan, actress
