= Heart: A History =

2018 book by Sandeep Jauhar

- Author: Sandeep Jauhar
- Published: by Farrar, Straus and Giroux, in 2018
- Publication place: United States, India, UK, the Netherlands
- Media type: Print (hardcover)
- Pages: 288
- ISBN: 9780374168650

Heart: A History is a 2018 book by Sandeep Jauhar. In the book Jauhar discusses the historical experiments and procedures done in the past and how innovations can be taken for granted.

== Plot ==
The book begins with Jauhar discussing his personal health and family history, with a focus on heart-related issues. He gives his opinion and discusses advances in technology over the past few decades and how they have shaped the way doctors practice cardiology today. Jauhar also discusses the old views people held about the heart and why it was the last organ operated on, given cultural perspectives, and the level of difficulty. He further notes several of his personal experiences as a cardiologist and states that the heart remains the center of attention in the body. Jauhar mentions research and experiments conducted on animals and humans, which he sees as unethical by modern standards, while stating that without them, society would not have the experience or procedures that are currently used.

Jauhar also covers the effects of emotions on the heart and how he believes stressors can significantly damage a person's heart. He states that doctors have lowered the risk of dying from a heart attack in a hospital to 3 percent, which he does not believe can be improved much further. He notes the difficulty for physicians to help patients prevent common stressors and that it has become easy to prescribe medicine for cholesterol. Finally, Jauhar advises that yoga, meditation, and activities that help emotions should be taught in schools and the medical field.

== Critical reception ==
Critical reception for the book has been positive, and received reviews from The New Statesman, The Globe and Mail, and Financial Express. The Washington Post and Business Standard both wrote favorable reviews, with the former stating that it was "a fascinating education for those of us who harbor this most hallowed organ but know little about it.”
