= It's All in Your Head (book) =

2015 book by Suzanne O'Sullivan

- Author: Suzanne O'Sullivan
- Genre: Medicine
- Publisher: Chatto & Windus
- Publication date: 4 June 2015
- Pages: 336
- ISBN: 978-0701189266

It's All in Your Head is a nonfiction book by neurologist Suzanne O'Sullivan, in which she shares her past experiences in diagnosing patients with psychosomatic disorders. The book focuses on the culture of medicine and societal views on psychosomatic illness—physical symptoms that stem from the mind. It's All in Your Head was first published by Chatto & Windus in 2015 and won the Wellcome Book Prize in 2016.

== Background ==
Suzanne O'Sullivan became a doctor in 1991, training in both neurology and clinical neurophysiology, at Trinity College Dublin. She works as a consultant neurologist in the national hospital for neurology and neuroscience in London since 2011. The title of the book was created in an ironic sense since patients with psychosomatic illnesses cannot stand being told by medical professionals that their symptoms are all in their head, which gives the impression that it is not real.

== Synopsis ==
In this book, O’Sullivan recounts her most memorable interactions of patients with severe physical symptoms that she found to come from their mental state in a total of twelve chapters. She starts the book introducing herself and providing information on her medical career and her passion for neurology and mental disorders.

The story is not sequential, instead each chapter depicts a different memory of her interactions with her patients. Each patient displays different symptoms varying in severity, but O’Sullivan comes to the same diagnosis and conclusion that these physical symptoms are actually psychosomatic disorders.

== Themes ==
=== Societal view on psychosomatic illness ===
Society perceives mental illnesses with a negative connotation bringing many difficulties for those diagnosed within that category of illnesses. O'Sullivan mentions that despite this stigma, psychosomatic illnesses are very common and there are insufficient methods of treatment. The negative view by society causes discrimination towards those who have a mental illness, making it harder to improve their condition. This stigma also makes patients more reluctant to accept their diagnosis and even medical professionals tend to display negative views.

=== Culture of medicine ===
The culture of medicine has caused medical professionals to become insensitive to a patient's mental health and dismiss their physical symptoms by claiming it's all in their head. The book discusses the difficulty of diagnosing those with psychosomatic illnesses since most doctors direct their focus on the physical symptoms and test results. O'Sullivan addresses in her book that doctors must become more empathetic and improve interactions between them and their patients. She also points out her concern that the current standards of treatment for mental illnesses are ineffective or slow to take effect therefore, more importance should be placed on finding more effective treatments.
