= Suzanne O'Sullivan =

Irish neurologist and author

Suzanne O'Sullivan is an Irish physician practising in Britain, specialising in neurology and clinical neurophysiology. In addition to academic publications in her field, O'Sullivan is an author of award-winning non-fiction books, each focusing on medical casework related to her neurology specialty (cases that have been disguised/anonymised).

== Early life and education ==
O'Sullivan is from Dublin and studied medicine at Trinity College Dublin. She qualified as a doctor in 1991. She was the first in her family to attend college. She initially wanted to be a writer, but her mother encouraged her to pursue studies with more postgraduate job opportunities.

O'Sullivan completed an M.A. in creative writing at Birkbeck College, University of London, in 2015.

== Career ==
O'Sullivan is a neurologist, clinical neurophysiologist, and writer (see following). As of 2015, she is a consultant neurologist at the National Hospital for Neurology and Neurosurgery in London. The main focuses of her work in neurology are in the treatment of epilepsy patients, and on improving medical care for people with psychosomatic disorders.

Included in her scholarly publications is work on Functional Neurological Disorder (FND).

As of 2025, O'Sullivan had authored four non-fiction books, concerned with psychosomatic illness, epilepsy, and over-medicalisation.

== Awards and recognition ==
O'Sullivan's 2016 book, It's All in Your Head: True Stories of Imaginary Illness, was shortlisted for the Books Are My Bag Readers Awards—a bookshop-curated, reader-selected award—for the year of its publication, and in that year it won the £30,000 Wellcome Book Prize, and the Royal Society of Biology's General Book Prize, for "an accessible, engaging and informative life sciences book written for a non-specialist audience".

An early work unrelated to her professional writing, the travel piece, "Going Off the Grid on Indonesia’s Forgotten Islands" (published in The Telegraph) won the Travel Writer of the Year Award, for longer form writing, from a trade group in 2018.

Her book, The Sleeping Beauties: And Other Stories of Mystery Illness, was shortlisted for the 2021 Royal Society Science Book Prize. The book also featured in recommendations of the Next Big Idea Club throughout 2021 and 2022, and the organisation interviewed O'Sullivan regarding the book in its magazine.

== Popular works ==
=== Overview ===
- O'Sullivan, Suzanne (5 October 2015). It's All in Your Head: True Stories of Imaginary Illness. London, England: Chatto & Windus—Vintage—Penguin Random House. ISBN 978-0701189266. For the publication date, see this link.
- —,— (29 May 2018). Brainstorm: The Detective Stories from the World of Neurology. London, England: Chatto & Windus—Vintage—Penguin Random House. ISBN 978-1784741310.
- —,— (1 April 2021). The Sleeping Beauties: And Other Stories of Mystery Illness. London, England: Picador-Pan MacMillan. ISBN 978-1529010558. Archived from the original on 16 January 2021.
- —,— (18 March 2025). The Age of Diagnosis: Sickness, Health and Why Medicine Has Gone Too Far. London, England: Thesis-Penguin Random House. ISBN 9780593852910.

=== It's All in Your Head: True Stories of Imaginary Illness (2015) ===
This, Sullivan's first book, was published by Chatto & Windus in 2015, to positive reviews. It has been recognised by multiple nominations and awards.

It's All in Your Head discusses issues surrounding psychosomatic illness, with particular attention given to its neurological manifestations. Specifically, it explores the mind-body connection through stories of O’Sullivan's patients, looking compassionately at serious medical problems that arise through psychological mechanisms. As well, O'Sullivan considers the history of the hysteria from ancient to modern times, discusses diagnosis, causes, mechanisms and treatment of neurological psychosomatic disorders in the modern era. Among the characters it presents are:

- Pauline, a woman experiencing since her mid-teens multiple unexplained and progressive medical issues, with symptoms including seizures and paralysis;
- Matthew, a man convinced he has multiple sclerosis, who struggles to accept alternate explanations for his leg paralysis; and
- Camilla, a lawyer, who experiences seizures, and cannot face their cause.

=== Brainstorm: The Detective Stories from the World of Neurology (2018) ===
This, O'Sullivan's second book,

Brainstorm published in 2018 by Chatto & Windus.is an account of how the study of epilepsy changed scientists’ understanding of the human brain. It explores modern views and treatments for epilepsy, and looks at what each teaches about how the brain functions. Among the characters Brainstorm presents are:

- Donal, who hallucinates cartoon dwarves;
- Maya, who faces possible radical surgery to address her epilepsy;
- Sharon, who experiences seizures who cause was other than diagnosed;

=== The Sleeping Beauties: And Other Stories of Mystery Illness (2021) ===
This, O'Sullivan's third book, was published in April 2021 by Picador in England, and by Pantheon in the United States, and was lauded by The Royal Society and other organisations.

Brandy Schillace, editor-in-chief of the journal Medical Humanities at the time her review, writes in The Wall Street Journal that O'Sullivan "uncovers... complex mechanisms while painting a picture of psychosomatic suffering that removes its associated stigma, and she asks us to think about illness in new ways." She concludes,

The Sleeping Beauties offers a brilliant, nuanced and thoughtful look at the lived experience of illness while asking important questions about the relationship between body and mind. Dr. O’Sullivan’s rich prose weaves a tapestry as hauntingly beautiful as it is scientifically valid.

In this book, O’Sullivan travels to visit communities globally that are said to be affected by mass hysteria and culture bound syndromes—ways that specific cultures express distress, troubled thoughts, etc. Among the characters Brainstorm presents are:

- schoolgirls in Colombia presenting with seizures, as an apparent contagious outbreak;
- Kazakhstani townspeople presenting with apparent sleeping sickness, again apparently contagious;
- the victims of sonic weapon attacks;
- indigenous Nicaraguans presenting with 'crazy sickness'; and
- a New York high school presenting with a Tourette's-like syndrome that is spreading.

=== The Age of Diagnosis Sickness, Health and Why Medicine Has Gone Too Far (2025) ===
This, O'Sullivan's fourth book, was published in March 2025 by Thesis-Penguin Random House in England, to positive early reviews.

== Personal life ==
O’Sullivan lives in London.
