= Intern: A Doctor's Initiation =

2007 autobiography by Sandeep Jauhar

- Author: Sandeep Jauhar
- Language: English
- Genre: Autobiography
- Published: December 26, 2007
- Publisher: Farrar, Straus and Giroux
- ISBN: 978-0-374-53159-1

Intern: A Doctor's Initiation is a 2007 nonfiction autobiographical account of Sandeep Jauhar's first year as a medical intern, immediately following medical school. At New York Hospital, he kept journals about his daily activities regarding patients and interaction with other doctors.

== Background ==
Sandeep Jauhar grew up in Riverside, California. Jauhar studied experimental physics at the University of California, Berkeley, but was also interested in journalism. After graduating with his Ph.D. in experimental physics, he was accepted into the AAAS Mass Media Fellowship, a scientific journalism fellowship. He moved to Washington D.C. to write for TIME Magazine for a summer. The following fall semester, he started medical school at Washington University in St. Louis, where he received his medical doctorate.

Upon completing medical school, he began his medical internship at New York Hospital (now New York-Presbyterian/Weill Cornell Medical Center). During his internship, Jauhar kept a daily journal where he documented his experiences and feelings. He used these journals to write his memoir, which focuses on his introduction to practicing medicine, his disillusionment as a medical student, and his imposter syndrome. A few years later, an editor from Farrar, Straus and Giroux offered him a contract to write a bildungsroman about his medical education. Jauhar agreed, leading to the publication of Intern: A Doctor’s Initiation.

== Themes ==
=== Disillusionment ===
A major theme in Intern: A Doctor's Initiation is looming disillusionment. Jauhar describes many medical situations in which he feels anxious, alone, and lost. As Jauhar would do rounds with his patients, each medical procedure made him feel uneasy and ill-prepared. One of the first experiences of his anxiousness was in a consultation with his patient, Dr. Washington, an older woman who was an obstetrician gynecologist. This visit was the first time Jauhar performed a rectal exam. He was not sure what to feel or say because he was so unprepared and an amateur at the procedure. Jauhar is embarrassed in front of others, for example, he was not able to insert arterial lines, while another intern was able to successfully perform the procedure. He wrote in his journal that he felt like a "shell of a resident." He felt alone and was not sure if anyone was able to relate to him.

=== Medical education ===
In the time of Jauhar's internship, these students were required to work consecutive days, and remain on call to respond quickly to emergencies. In the memoir, Jauhar expressed that the overwhelming work as a doctor was tiring and felt impossible. He described that "If you did everything, you felt overwhelmed, if you didn't, you felt guilty." This issue in medical education was changed in the 1980s, when a limit on hours given to interns/student working in the hospital was signed into law. These students were given fewer hours in order to lessen fatigue and to improve patient care. Jauhar criticizes the limitation because he believes that both options have shortcomings. He explains that students who are given fewer hours start each shift with new cases are not able to follow a case for several days. He believes that this provides incomplete training in medicine and may train physicians to see patients as cases and not humans. The medical education criticism in the novel also touches on how doctors become apathetic towards their patients. When treating a patient who was experiencing worsening seizures, Jauhar admits that he had felt his confidence increasing as he understood that he was "fighting a losing battle." This, in Jauhar's opinion, shows how doctors might come to see patients as test dummies, and to use the situation to learn and expand their experience.

== Critical reception ==
Intern: A Doctor's Initiation has been read by both those in or interested in the medical profession, and by those interested in human behavior and connection. Jauhar has received positive feedback in regards to his medical memoir, showing readers a humanistic view of doctors and the struggles of mental health as a health care professional.
