= The Outrun (film) =

2024 film by Nora Fingscheidt

- Film poster
- Directed by: Nora Fingscheidt
- Screenplay by: Nora Fingscheidt; Amy Liptrot
- Story by: Amy Liptrot; Nora Fingscheidt; Daisy Lewis
- Based on: The Outrun by Amy Liptrot
- Produced by: Sarah Brocklehurst; Dominic Norris; Jack Lowden; Saoirse Ronan
- Starring: Saoirse Ronan; Paapa Essiedu; Nabil Elouahabi; Izuka Hoyle; Lauren Lyle; Saskia Reeves; Stephen Dillane
- Cinematography: Yunus Roy Imer
- Edited by: Stephan Bechinger
- Music by: John Gürtler; Jan Miserre
- Production companies: BBC Film; Protagonist Pictures; Brock Media; Arcade Pictures
- Distributed by: StudioCanal
- Release dates: 19 January 2024 (Sundance); 27 September 2024 (United Kingdom); 5 December 2024 (Germany)
- Running time: 118 minutes
- Countries: Germany; United Kingdom
- Language: English
- Box office: $4.7 million

The Outrun is a 2024 drama film starring Saoirse Ronan as a woman who returns home to the Orkney Islands in Scotland. The film was directed by Nora Fingscheidt and written by Fingscheidt and Amy Liptrot, based on Liptrot's 2016 memoir The Outrun. The film is a co-production between the United Kingdom and Germany. Paapa Essiedu, Nabil Elouahabi, Izuka Hoyle, Lauren Lyle, Saskia Reeves and Stephen Dillane appear in supporting roles.

The film premiered at the Sundance Film Festival on 19 January 2024. It was released by StudioCanal in the United Kingdom on 27 September 2024 and in Germany on 5 December.

== Plot ==
The story is told in a non-linear fashion. Rona, a young woman recently out of rehab for alcoholism, returns home to the Orkney Islands in Scotland. Her parents, originally from England, are separated. Staying with them alternately, she helps her father on his farm and meets her mother's religious friends.

In flashbacks, Rona's previous life as a biology graduate student in London is shown, finding freedom in clubbing and meeting a boyfriend, Daynin. However, Rona's drinking turns to alcoholism, causing problems in her relationship, and unintentional injury. Eventually, Daynin leaves her. One night, she is attacked while drunk. Soon afterwards, she enters rehab and completes a 90-day sober programme.

Back on Orkney, Rona struggles to connect with others. She decides to return to London, but on the ferry, feels an overwhelming urge to drink, and abandons her plan to leave. She takes a job with the Royal Society for the Protection of Birds (RSPB), which involves a systematic search for the now-rare corn crake. She listens at assigned hours for its distinctive frog-like call. Rona's father has bipolar disorder, and when she comes across him in a depressive and non-responsive state, she takes a taste from his abandoned wineglass, leading to a brief relapse.

Soon afterwards, Rona gets a job with the RSPB on the remote Papa Westray island, home to a tiny community. Living by herself, she connects with some of the other islanders, including a fellow alcoholic who runs the grocery. Throughout a windy winter on Papa Westray, she develops an interest in seaweed biology and grows healthier. As she prepares to depart that spring, she hears the call of a corn crake for the first time and laughs in delight.

== Cast ==
- Saoirse Ronan as Rona
- Saskia Reeves as Annie
- Louise McMenemy as Young Annie
- Stephen Dillane as Andrew
- Scott Miller as Young Andrew
- Lauren Lyle as Julie
- Paapa Essiedu as Daynin
- Izuka Hoyle as Gloria
- Eilidh Fisher as Evie
- Naomi Wirthner as Amanda
- Danyal Ismail as Pascal
- Posy Sterling as Rita
- Nabil Elouahabi as Samir
- Jack Rooke as Lukas
- Seamus Dillane as James
- Conrad Williamson as Jack
- Tony Hamilton as Gary
- Ammar Younis as Aahil

== Production ==
In January 2022, it was announced Nora Fingscheidt would direct a film adaptation of Amy Liptrot's memoir The Outrun, with Saoirse Ronan set to star and produce, and Fingscheidt and Liptrot writing the screenplay. Production commenced in Orkney in August 2022. Ronan's husband, actor Jack Lowden, was one of the film's producers. In an interview with The Times, Ronan credited Lowden for suggesting the role to her.

== Release ==
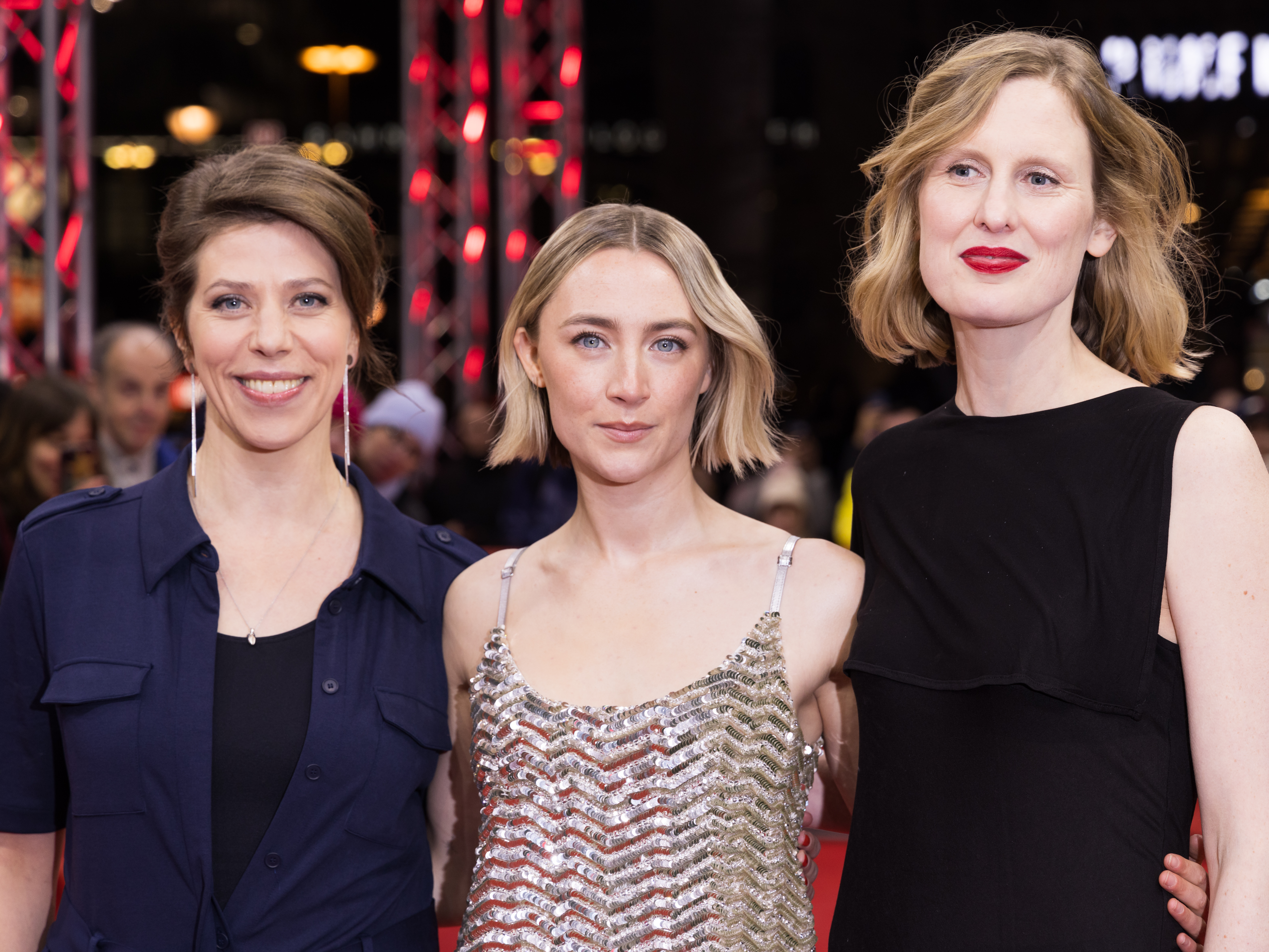
Nora Fingscheidt, Saoirse Ronan, and Amy Liptrot at the film's screening at Berlin in February 2024

StudioCanal is the film's distributor in the United Kingdom, France, Germany and Austria. The film was theatrically released in the United Kingdom on 27 September 2024, and later in Germany on 5 December. Protagonist Pictures is overseeing worldwide sales for the film, with CAA Media Finance also selling North American rights. The film was sold to Filmcoopi and Cineworx for Switzerland, Cinéart for Benelux and Stage 6 Films for all other international territories excluding North America. On 12 July 2024, Stage 6 was announced to be partnering with sister company Sony Pictures Classics on the film's North American release, scheduling it for a theatrical release on 4 October 2024. The movie was released on Netflix in the UK and US in February and March 2025.

The film premiered at the Sundance Film Festival on 19 January 2024. It was also screened at the 74th Berlin International Film Festival in the Panorama section, the 77th Edinburgh International Film Festival and the 2024 Cinéfest Sudbury International Film Festival.

== Reception ==
=== Critical response ===
On the review aggregator website Rotten Tomatoes, 82% of 161 critics' reviews are positive, with an average rating of 7.5/10. The website's consensus reads: "Benefiting from Saoirse Ronan's deeply committed performance in the central role, The Outrun proves a moving portrait of addiction in spite of its somewhat shapeless narrative." Metacritic, which uses a weighted average, assigned the film a score of 72 out of 100, based on 43 critics, indicating "generally favorable" reviews.

The Guardian's Adrian Horton termed it "a moving and delicate adaptation" that "avoid[ed] the many cliches of the cinematic memoir adaptation", and took particular note of "Ronan's good performance". David Rooney of The Hollywood Reporter wrote, "Fingscheidt’s third narrative feature continues her visceral explorations of the scarred female psyche" and added that Ronan "puts herself through the physical and emotional wringer" in an "emotionally charged performance".

Alissa Wilkinson in The New York Times writes that Saoirse Ronan's greatness as an actor is in giving viewers the feeling "that her characters' minds are always working", using her eyes and the slightest of facial expressions to convey, in the case of The Outrun, a cheeky "impishness". Far from the conventional screen handling of addiction, "brash or hyperbolic", Ronan makes the film "into a thing of beauty and hard-won joy."

=== Accolades ===
Award	Ceremony date	Category	Recipient(s)	Result	Ref.
Berlin International Film Festival	25 February 2024	Panorama Audience Award for Best Feature Film	Nora Fingscheidt	Nominated	
Telluride Film Festival	30 August 2024	Silver Medallion	Saoirse Ronan	Won	
Evolution Mallorca International Film Festival	5 November 2024	Best Actress	Saoirse Ronan	Won	
Evolution Mallorca International Film Festival	5 November 2024	Best Film	The Outrun	Nominated	
Gotham Awards	2 December 2024	Outstanding Lead Performance	Saoirse Ronan	Nominated	
British Independent Film Awards	8 December 2024	Best Lead Performance	Saoirse Ronan	Nominated	
British Independent Film Awards	8 December 2024	Best British Independent Film	The Outrun	Nominated	
British Independent Film Awards	8 December 2024	Best Director	Nora Fingscheidt	Nominated	
British Independent Film Awards	8 December 2024	Best Screenplay	Nora Fingscheidt and Amy Liptrot	Nominated	
British Independent Film Awards	8 December 2024	Best Cinematography	Yunus Roy Imer	Nominated	
British Independent Film Awards	8 December 2024	Best Editing	Stephen Bechinger	Nominated	
British Independent Film Awards	8 December 2024	Best Make-Up & Hair Design	Kat Morgan	Nominated	
British Independent Film Awards	8 December 2024	Best Original Music	John Gürtler and Jan Miserre	Nominated	
British Independent Film Awards	8 December 2024	Best Sound	Dominik Leube, Oscar Stiebitz, Jonathan Schorr and Gregor Bonse	Nominated	
St. Louis Film Critics Association	15 December 2024	Best Actress	Saoirse Ronan	Nominated	
Satellite Awards	16 January 2025	Best Actress in a Motion Picture – Drama	Saoirse Ronan	Nominated	
British Academy Film Awards	16 February 2025	Best Actress	Saoirse Ronan	Nominated	
British Academy Film Awards	16 February 2025	Outstanding British Film	The Outrun	Nominated	
Vancouver Film Critics Circle	19 February 2025	Best Actress	Saoirse Ronan	Nominated	
