= Amy Liptrot =

Scottish journalist and author (born 1981/82)

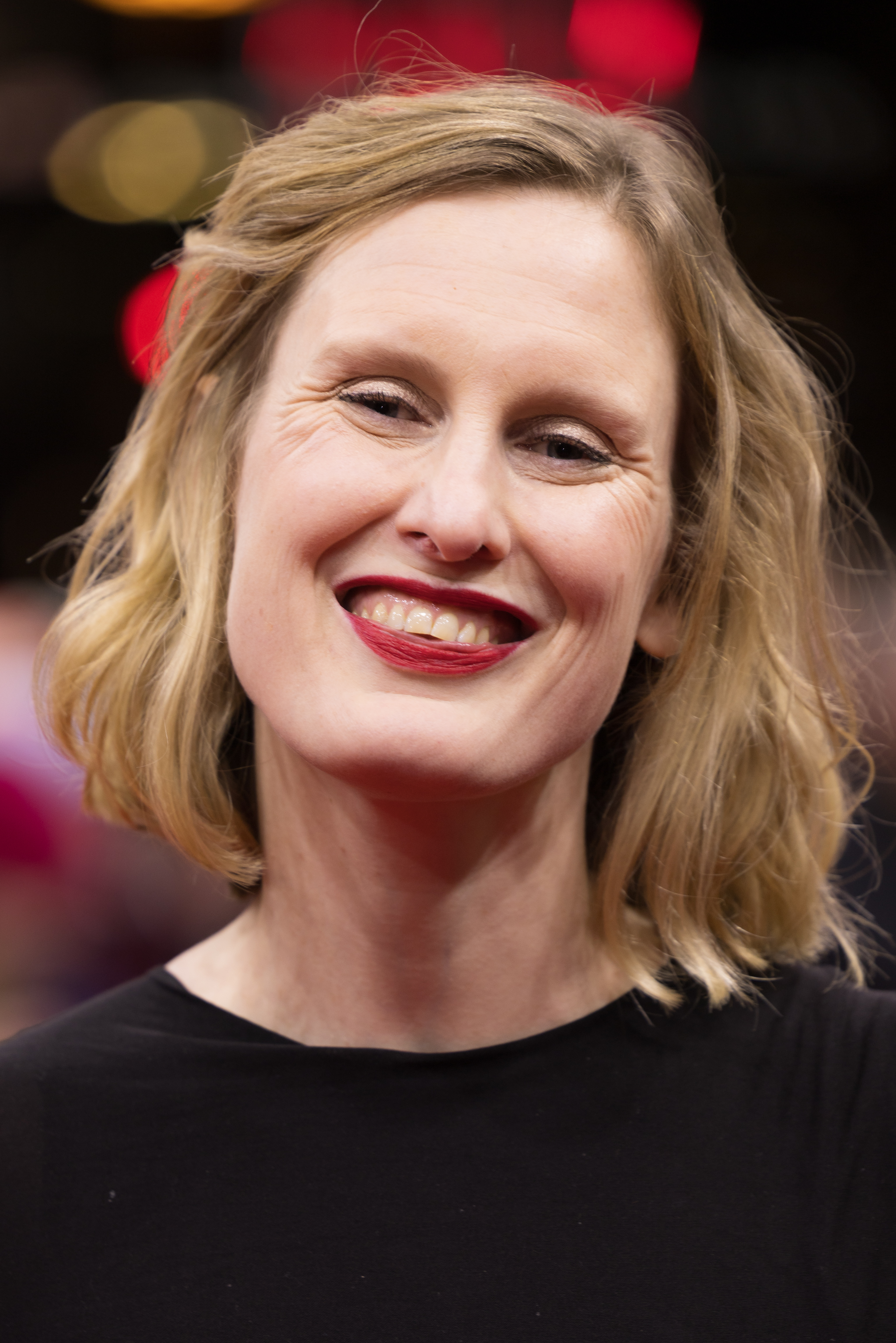
- In 2024
- Born: 1981 or 1982 (age 44–45)
- Occupations: Journalist, author
- Children: 1
- Writing career
- Notable work: The Outrun

Amy Liptrot is a Scottish journalist and author. She won the 2016 Wainwright Prize and the 2017 PEN/Ackerley Prize for her memoir The Outrun.

== Biography ==
Amy Liptrot grew up on a farm in Orkney and studied at the University of Edinburgh. She lived in London for ten years, resorting to alcohol and drug use. After losing her job, her home, and her boyfriend because of her alcoholism, she returned to Orkney to rehabilitate. She recorded her experiences there in her first book, The Outrun, published in 2016. She gave birth to a child in December 2018. As of 2019 Liptrot had been without alcohol for eight years. As of 2024, Liptrot lives in Hebden Bridge in West Yorkshire, England.

She contributed an essay on wild swimming to Antlers of Water, a compendium of Scottish nature writing produced during the COVID-19 pandemic. Her book The Instant was published in 2022. It describes a year she spent living in Berlin after the period covered in The Outrun.

== Honours and distinctions ==
- Wainwright Prize, 2016
- PEN/Ackerley Prize, 2017

== Bibliography ==
- The Outrun
- The Instant

== Adaptations ==
In January 2022, it was announced that Nora Fingscheidt would direct a film adaptation of The Outrun, and that Saoirse Ronan would star in it as Liptrot, and produce it. Filming began in 2022 in Orkney. The film The Outrun premiered at the 2024 Sundance Film Festival.
